= Dacian fortress of Feldioara =

Fortress

- Location within Romania
- 45.820334°N 25.606172°E
- Location: Feldioara, Brașov, Romania

Site notes
- Condition: Ruined

Monument istoric
- Reference no.: BV-II-a-A-11694

It was a Dacian fortified town.
