= Rotbav Bronze Age site =

Archaeological site in Romania

Rotbav "La Pârâuț", spelled La Pîrîuț until 1993, is a Bronze Age site in southeastern Transylvania, Romania, located at the southern border of the modern village of Rotbav, in Feldioara commune, and 20 km (12 mi) north of Brașov, capital of the county by the same name. The settlement of Rotbav is situated upon a high terrace formation above the Olt River. Its importance lies in a long stratigraphy comprising the timespan from the Early Bronze Age to the Bronze Age–Iron Age transition. It is the most extensively researched site of this period in the region.

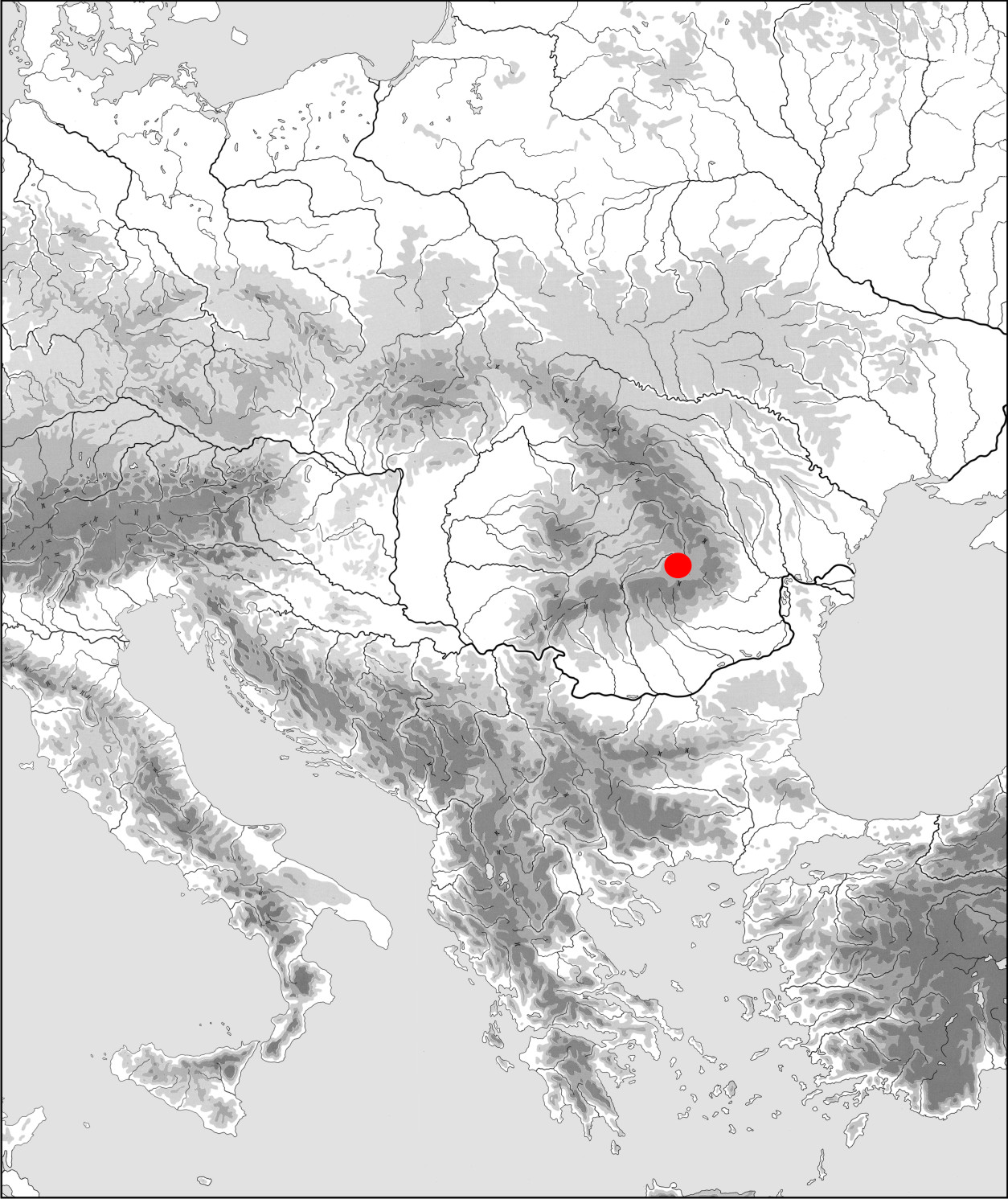
Geographical location of the archaeological site of Rotbav, Transylvania, Romania

== History of research ==
Chance finds from the Bronze Age were made in Rotbav already in the 19th century, but the "La Pârâuț" settlement was first investigated in the 1950s by a local teacher, Nicolae Croitoru. Systematic archaeological research started in the 1970s with excavations led by Alexandru Vulpe and Mariana Marcu of the Bucharest Institute of Archaeology and History Museum of Braşov, and was continued from 2005 on by Laura Dietrich, Oliver Dietrich and Alexandru Vulpe, within the framework of a cooperation project of the Bucharest Institute of Archaeology and the History Museum of Braşov. The settlement has a size of approximately 4 ha, of which 1800 square meters were excavated, the whole area was additionally investigated by archaeological and geophysical surveys (magnetometry).

== Natural environment ==
Natural conditions and resources such as salt and metals characterize southeastern Transylvania as one of the most favourable Bronze Age settlement areas in Europe. Easily accessible passes through the Carpathian Mountains make it an important communication area between the eastern Eurasian steppes, the Eastern Mediterranean region and Central Europe. Comparatively few Bronze Age sites were excavated in this region so far, Rotbav is the only multi-stratified site in which the whole development from the Early until the Late Bronze Age (a period of about 800 years) could be observed.

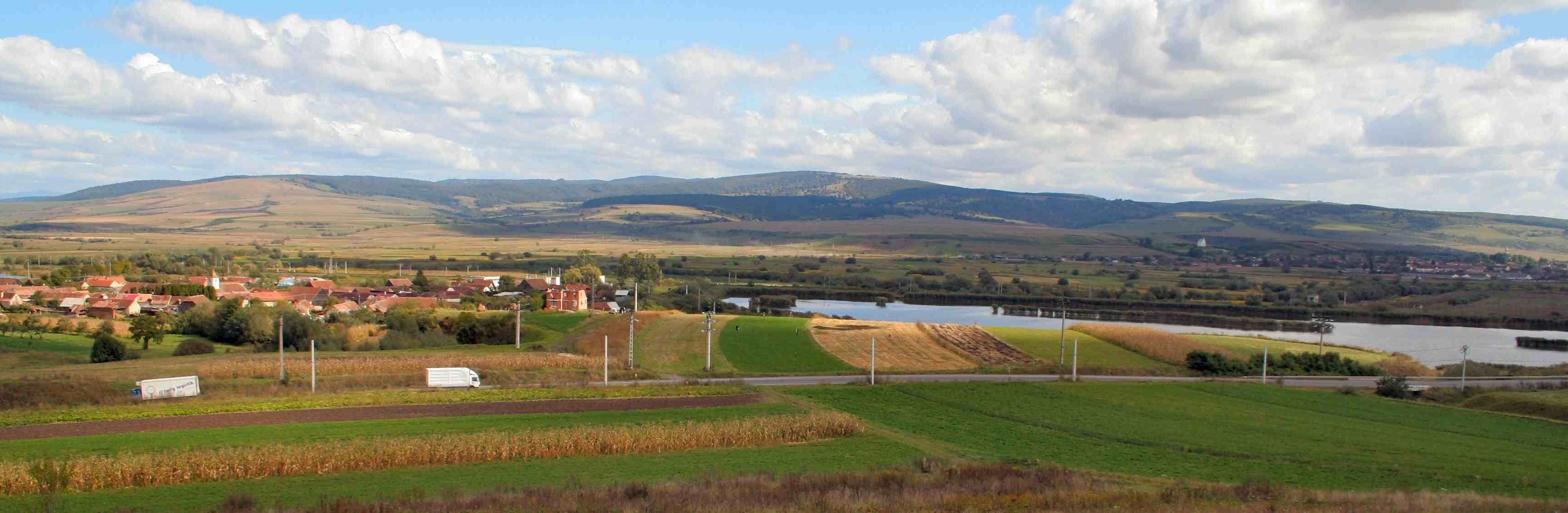
Archaeological Site of Rotbav, southeastern Transylvania, Romania

== La Pârâuț site ==
According to radiocarbon data, the Bronze Age settlement of Rotbav was inhabited between 1900/1800 and 1200/1100 BC (calibrated data). The site was then abandoned-possibly due to climatic deterioration and erosion processes-and never settled again. Agricultural use of the area started at the latest with the establishment of the medieval settlement of Rotbav around AD 1250.

=== Stratigraphy ===
The stratigraphic sequence covers six distinct building phases. The first three belong to the early Middle Bronze Age Wietenberg culture, followed by two of the Late Bronze Age Noua culture. The latest building phase belongs to the Gáva culture, which marks the Bronze Age-Iron Age transition. Additionally, in a small part of the site, traces of the Late Copper Age Baden-Coțofeni culture were discovered.

==== Rotbav 1-3: The Wietenberg settlement ====
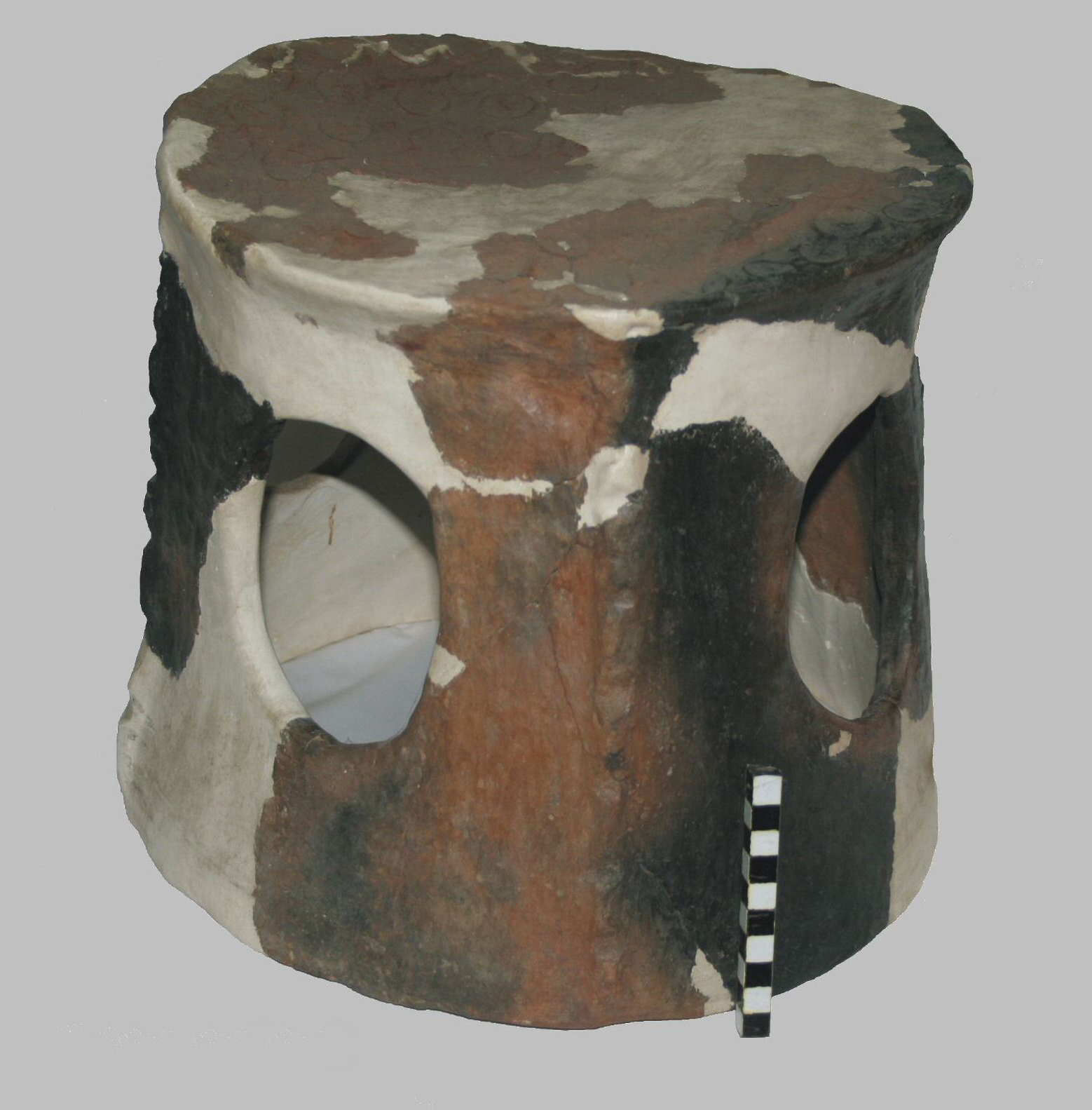
Portable stove of the Wietenberg culture from Rotbav

In the first three building phases belonging to the Wietenberg culture, small houses of about 20-25 square meters were documented. They were constructed of wooden posts and wattle covered by daub, with some daub walls ornamented with spirals. The floors were made of pisé. Such constructions leave few traces and are archaeologically almost invisible, so that only a minor number could be documented. Storage pits and fireplaces were found inside the houses; separate storage areas for vessels were also identified. In addition, special fireplaces used in cultic activities existed near the houses. They consist of round burnished clay surfaces decorated with spirals; in pits below them fragments of miniature wheels and wagons were found. Based on palynological and archaeozoological data, the diet mainly consisted of einkorn wheat, barley and bromus, cattle, sheep, pigs and goats. A lucky find is a vessel from a pit containing the carbonized rests of a gruel made inter alia of acorns and meat. The cemetery was placed on the north border of the settlement; so far two urn graves were excavated. Presumably only a very small part of the population was actually buried, the Wietenberg cemeteries being generally very small. In the case of Rotbav, the dead were well burnt, then the bones were collected and put in the funerary urn, which was then placed in a bigger pit and surrounded by river snail shells. The characteristic find category of this period is the fine pottery, which was produced in large numbers and extensively decorated. The hard, well-burnt red or black ware bears incisions, stamps and impressions, which were finally filled with a white substance, probably made of bones or lime. The earlier pottery shows geometrical motifs, in the second and third phase S- and Z-shaped hooks appear, which were most probably abstract representations of animals with a symbolic meaning in the community's cosmology.

==== Rotbav 4-5: The Noua settlement ====
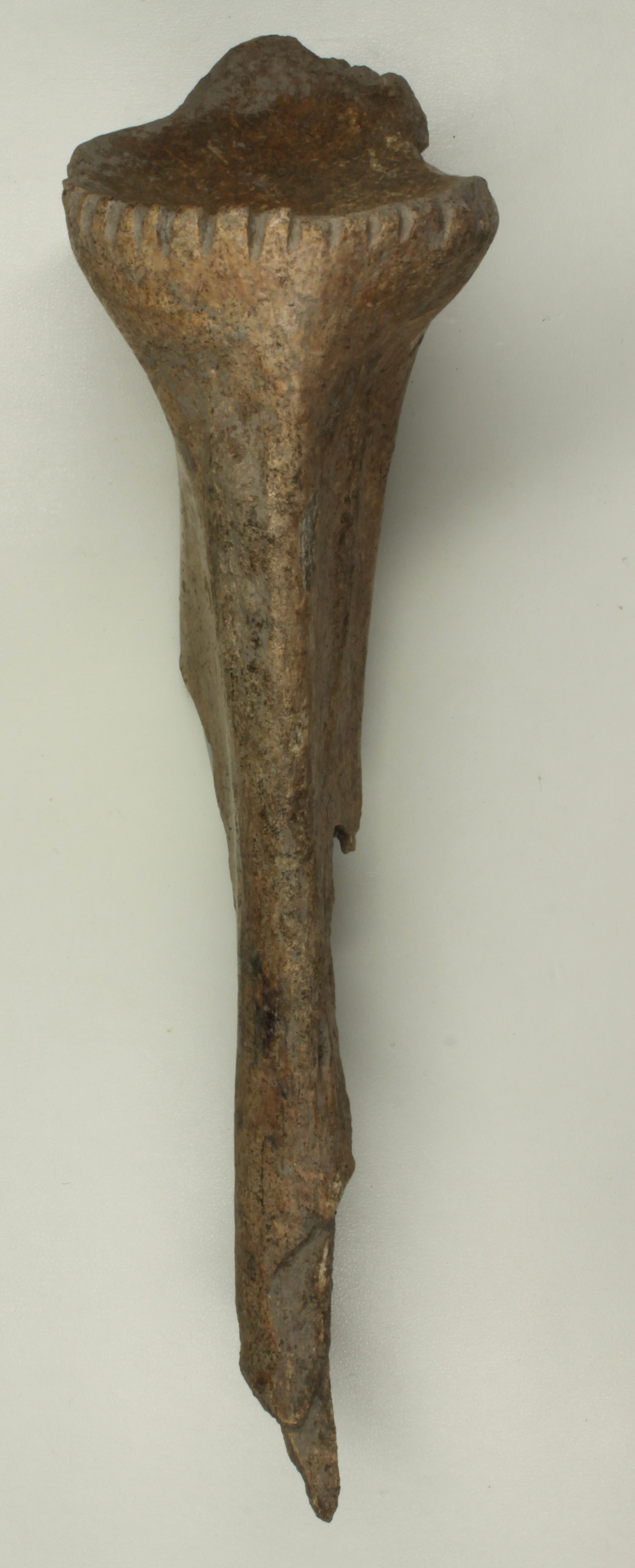
Crenated scapula from Rotbav

At the beginning of the 15th century BC, after the last phase of the Wietenberg culture, a sudden change in the development of the settlement appeared. The architecture, the funerary rites, the pottery and material culture in general changed. These changes resulted from the arrival of a new population from the Eurasian steppes, the so-called Noua-Sabatinovka-Coslogeni culture, in southeastern Transylvania. Houses are now characterized by massive limed floors, and the fireplaces were situated outside. The cemetery of the new population lies to the south of the settlement. Inhumation graves in stone cists are now typical, and the dead lie crouched on one side. Burial goods include vessels and food (animal bones). The pottery comprises much fewer shapes and is largely undecorated and coarse. The fine ware is represented exclusively by two- and one-handled drinking vessels (kantharoi). A special feature of the earlier Noua building phase is a so-called "ashmound". These round heaps formed of greyish sediments are typical for settlements of the Noua-Sabatinovka-Cologeni cultural complex. Until recently they were believed to represent the remains of houses or burned waste. New evidence shows that the "ashmounds" are not randomly formed mounds of waste, but special, collectively used places at the boundaries of settlements; they are not piled on the walking level, but in intentionally dug round basins. Chemical evidence from Rotbav and other sites proves the sediment to be constituted not of ash, but of a mixture of earth and burnt lime. Burnt lime is ethnographically known to have been used for removing hair from hides. Tools for the scraping of hides, needles, awls and a considerable amount of animal bones, give further prove for an intense production of leather. Concentrations of drinking vessels and cooking utensils prove that the 'ashmounds' may also have played a role in feasting.

==== Rotbav 6: the Gáva settlement ====
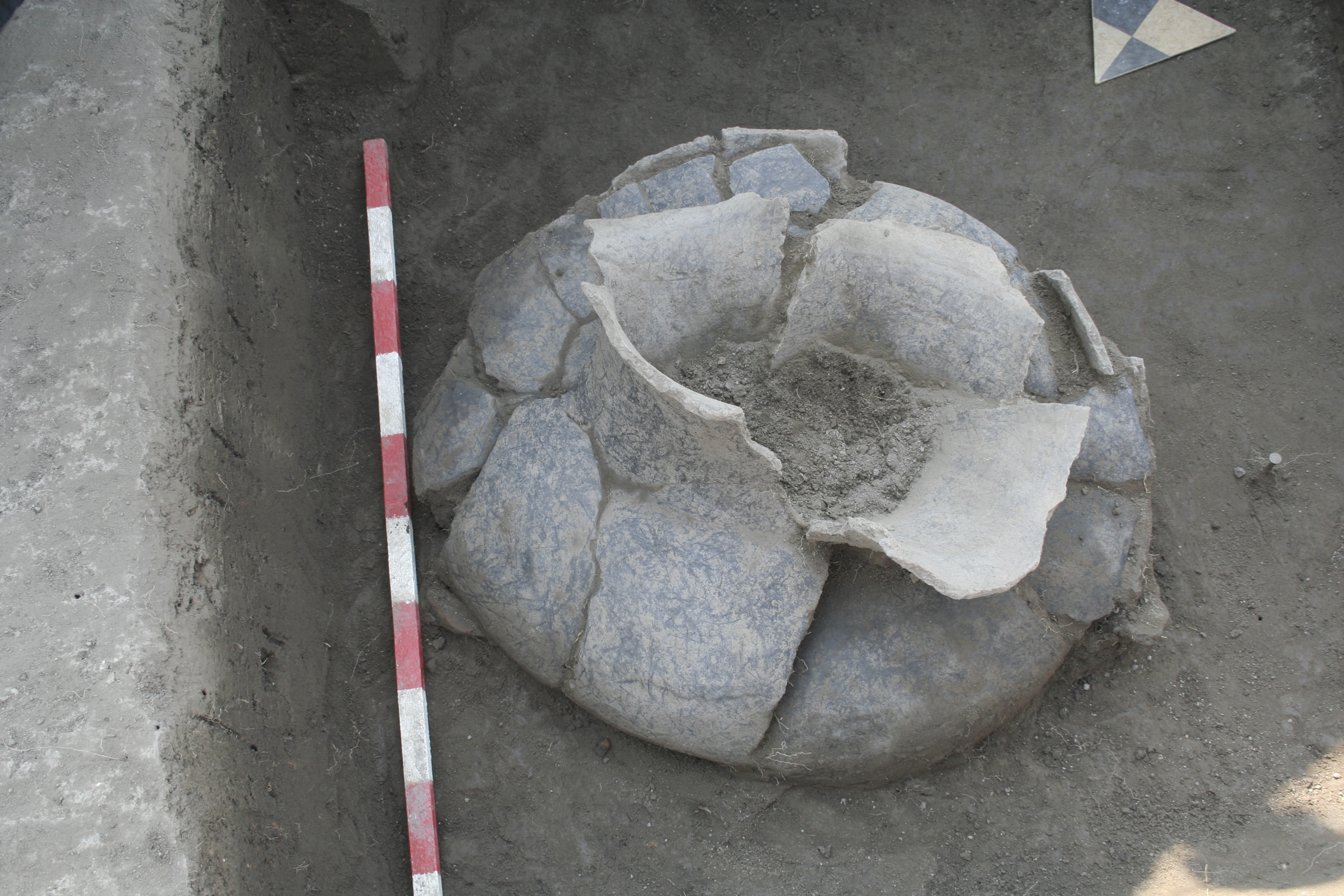
Vessel of the Gáva culture from Rotbav

Slow changes of the material culture mark the last building phase in Rotbav. Pottery shapes and ornamentation, especially of the coarse ware, have many similarities with the earlier phase. The typical two- and one-handled drinking vessels however are replaced by a new category of fine ware which is adopted from western Transylvania. This new style is characterized by channelled ornamentation, mainly realized on pottery with polished surfaces, hard baked and black on the outside and red/orange on the inside. A new settlement layout develops as a consequence of climatic changes. Up to 12 m (39 ft) long semi-subterranean dwellings are now attested. They are regularly dispersed over the settled area with open spaces of approximately 8 m (26 ft) between them, the fireplaces as well as numerous bell-shaped storage pits being situated outside the houses.

== Bibliography ==
- Dietrich, Laura (2013), "Visible workshops for invisible commodities. Leatherworking in the Late Bronze Age Noua culture's 'ashmounds'." In: S.C. Ailincai, A. Țârlea, C. Micu (eds). Lower Danube Prehistory. 50 years of excavations at Babadag (1962‐2012), Brăila, pp. 227-246.
- Dietrich, Laura (2012), '"Was sind die "Aschehügel" der Noua-Kultur? Das Beispiel aus Rotbav (Südostsiebenbürgen)". In: Heske, I., Horejs, B. (eds.), Bronzezeitliche Identitäten und Objekte, Bonn, pp. 207-217.
- Dietrich, Laura and Dietrich, Oliver (2011 a), "Wietenberg ohne Mykene? Gedanken zu Herkunft und Bedeutung der Keramikverzierung der Wietenberg-Kultur". Prähistorische Zeitschrift 86, 1, pp. 67-84.
- Dietrich, Laura and Dietrich, Oliver (2011 b), Alte und neue Bronzefunde aus Rotbav, ȚLa PârâuțȚ. Materiale și Cercetări Arheologice N.F. 3, 2007, 89-102.
- Dietrich, Laura (2010 a), "Eliten der frühen und mittleren Bronzezeit im südöstlichen Karpatenbecken". Prähistorische Zeitschrift 85, pp. 191-206.
- Dietrich, Laura (2010 b), "Ein Schmuckensemble der Noua-Kultur aus der bronzezeitlichen Siedlung von Rotbav (Südostsiebenbürgen)". Studii şi Cercetări de Istorie Veche şi Arheologie 61, 1-2, pp. 171-178.
- Dietrich, Oliver (2010), "Kinderspielzeug oder Kultobjekte? Überlegungen zu anthropomorphen Figurinen der Wietenberg- und Tei-Kultur". In: Sándor Berecki, Rita E. Németh, Botond Rezi (eds.), Bronze Age Rites and Rituals in the Carpathian Basin. Proceedings of the International Colloquium from Târgu Mureş 8.-10.10.2010, Târgu Mureş, pp. 87-106.
- Dietrich, Oliver (2009), "Ein kleiner Bronzedepotfund aus der Siedlung von Rotbav, „La Pârâuţ“ sowie einige Gedanken zum Auftreten zyprischer Schleifennadeln in der Noua-Kultur". In: Laura Dietrich, Oliver Dietrich, Bernhard Heeb, Alexandru Szentmiklosi (ed.), In Honorem Tudor Soroceanu. Analele Banatului XVII, pp. 97-107.
