= National Museum of the Union =

Museum in Alba Iulia, Romania

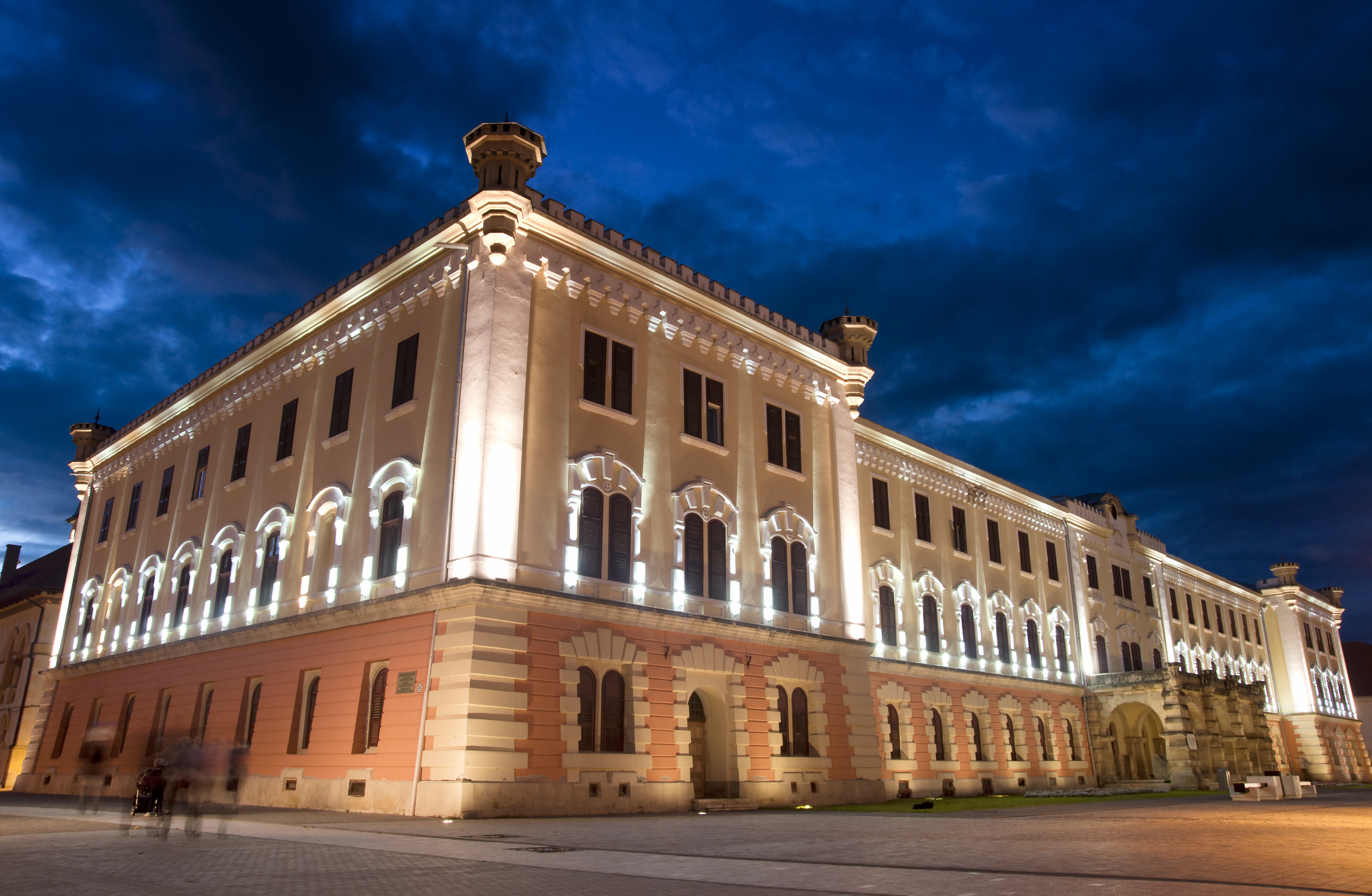

The National Museum of the Union (Romanian: Muzeul Național al Unirii) is a history and archaeology museum in Alba-Iulia, Romania.

== History ==
The museum was inaugurated in 1888 upon the initiative of the Historical, Archaeological and Natural Sciences Society of the Lower Alba County, having the famous archaeologist Adalbert Cserni as headmaster.

In 1929, under the aegis of the ASTRA Association, it was organized as the Museum of the Union. Valuable artefacts further enriched the rich archaeological collections and a new collection of items belonging to the modern history of the Romanians was added. In 1938, under the lead of the historian Ion Berciu, the settlement came to be managed by the Romanian state under the new name of Alba Regional Museum.

In 1968, it underwent an ample reorganization, returning to its former name.

== Buildings ==
The "Babylon" building is a historic monument built between 1851 and 1853, bearing influences of Romantic architecture. It was used as a residence pavilion for officers, and between 1967 and 1968, it was refurbished to become a museum.

The "Union Hall" (Sala Unirii) was built between 1898 and 1900. It is the building where the Great National Assembly of Alba Iulia voted the Union of Transylvania with Romania.

Both buildings of the museum are listed as historic monuments.

== Collections ==
It is worth mentioning bronze deposits of Cugir, Ighiel, Zlatna, and Vințu de Jos, as well as the pottery, the zoomorphic idols and the iron, bronze and stone tools, discovered in the fortified great settlement of Teleac. Especially interesting are the marble statuette depicting Liber Pater, the bronze collection, the glass collection, bone, horn and ivory objects as well as the monetary hoards from Alba Iulia, Tibru, Geomal, Șpring, and Medveș. These include the silver hoard from Lupu and the materials discovered in the Princely tomb of Cugir. The numismatic collection includes ancient, medieval and modern coins, plaques and coins.

The modern history collection contains documents, photographs, memorial objects from the Revolution of 1848 and the Union of 1 December 1918 of Transylvania with Romania.

The museum owns goods listed in the Romanian National Cultural Heritage Treasure.

== Gallery ==
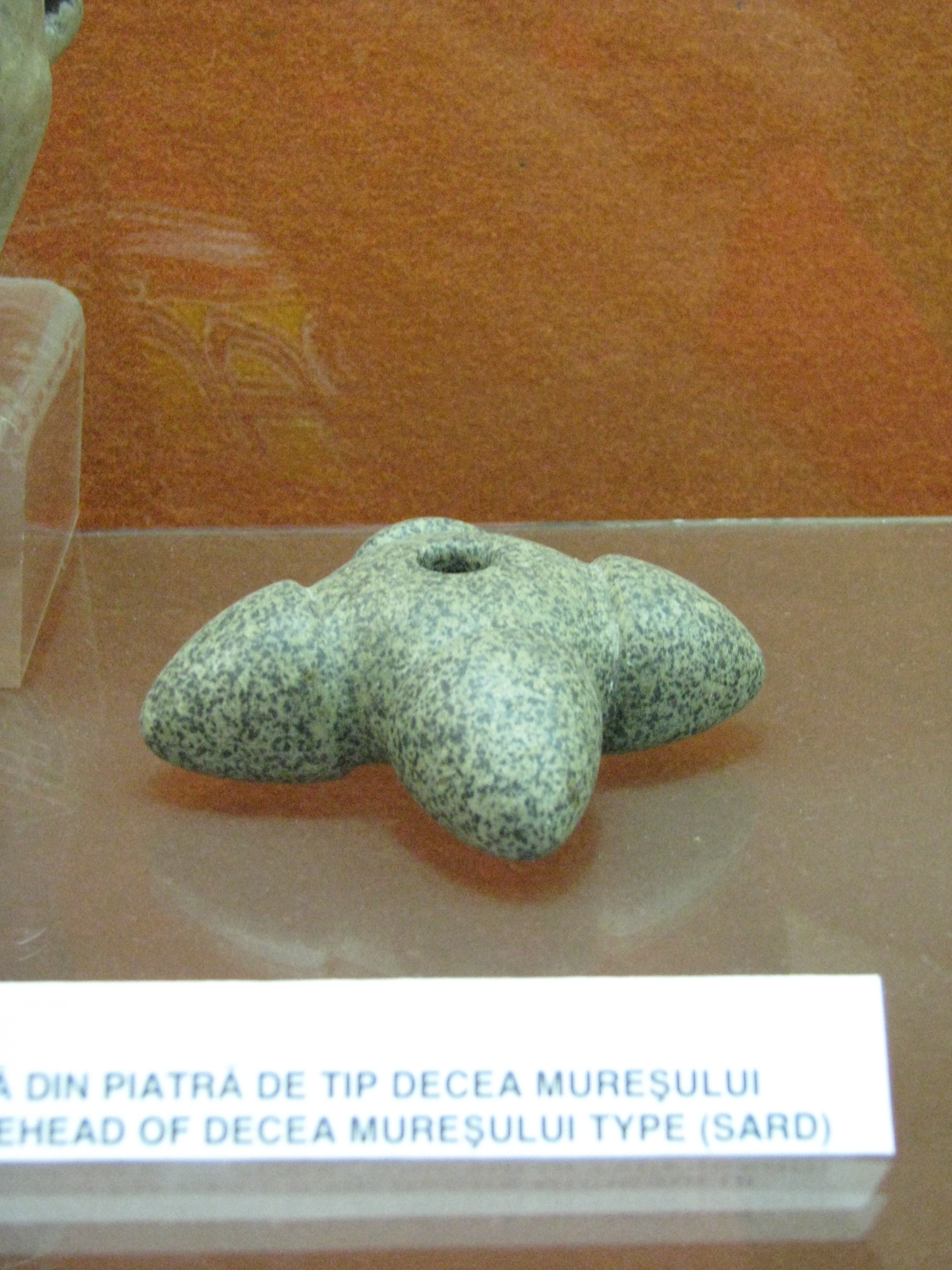
Stone mace head of Decea Mureșului culture from Șard, Alba

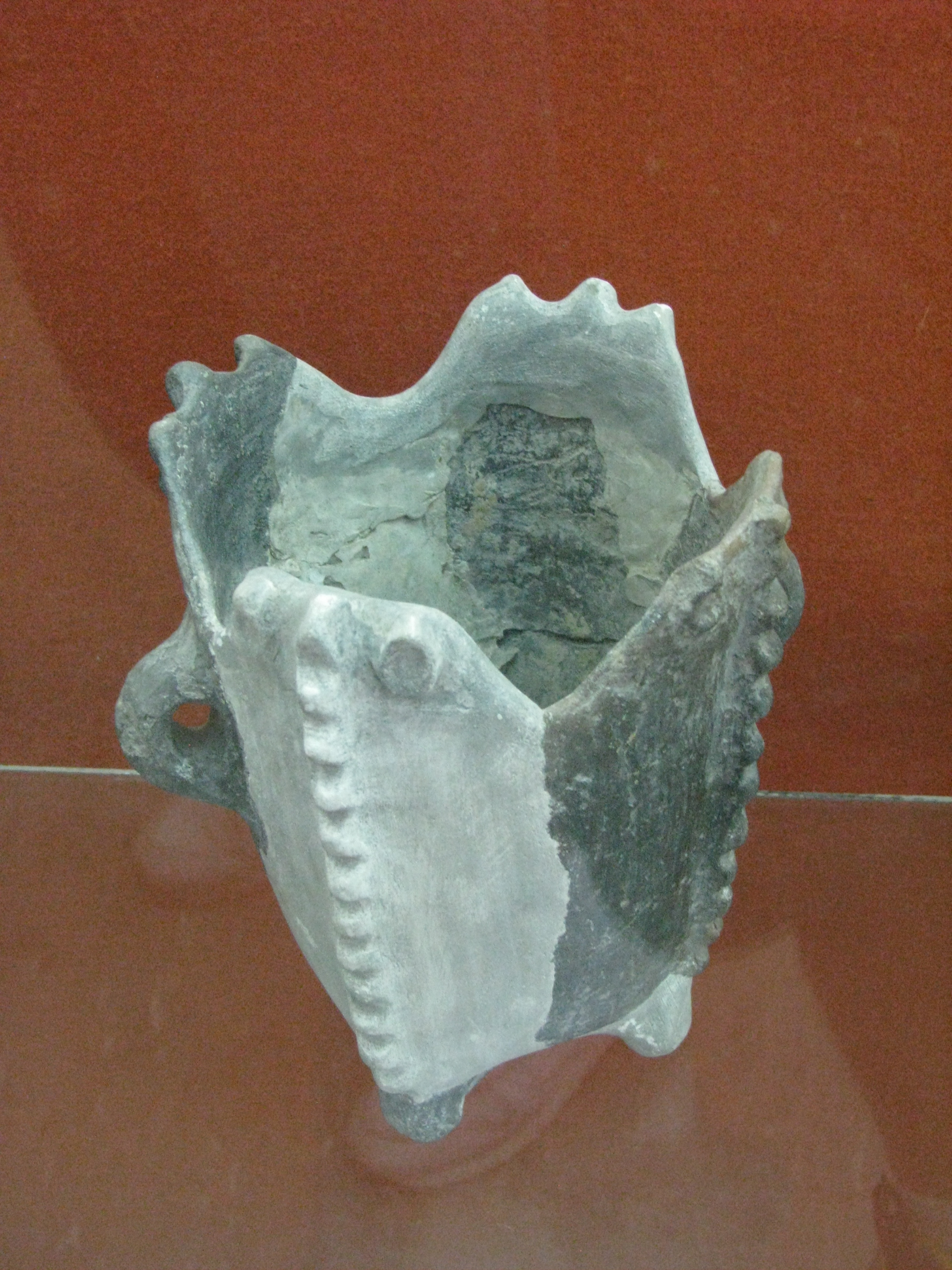
Herculane-Cheile Turzii culture vessel, dated 3800-3500 BC (Middle Eneolithic Period), found at Cheile Turzii

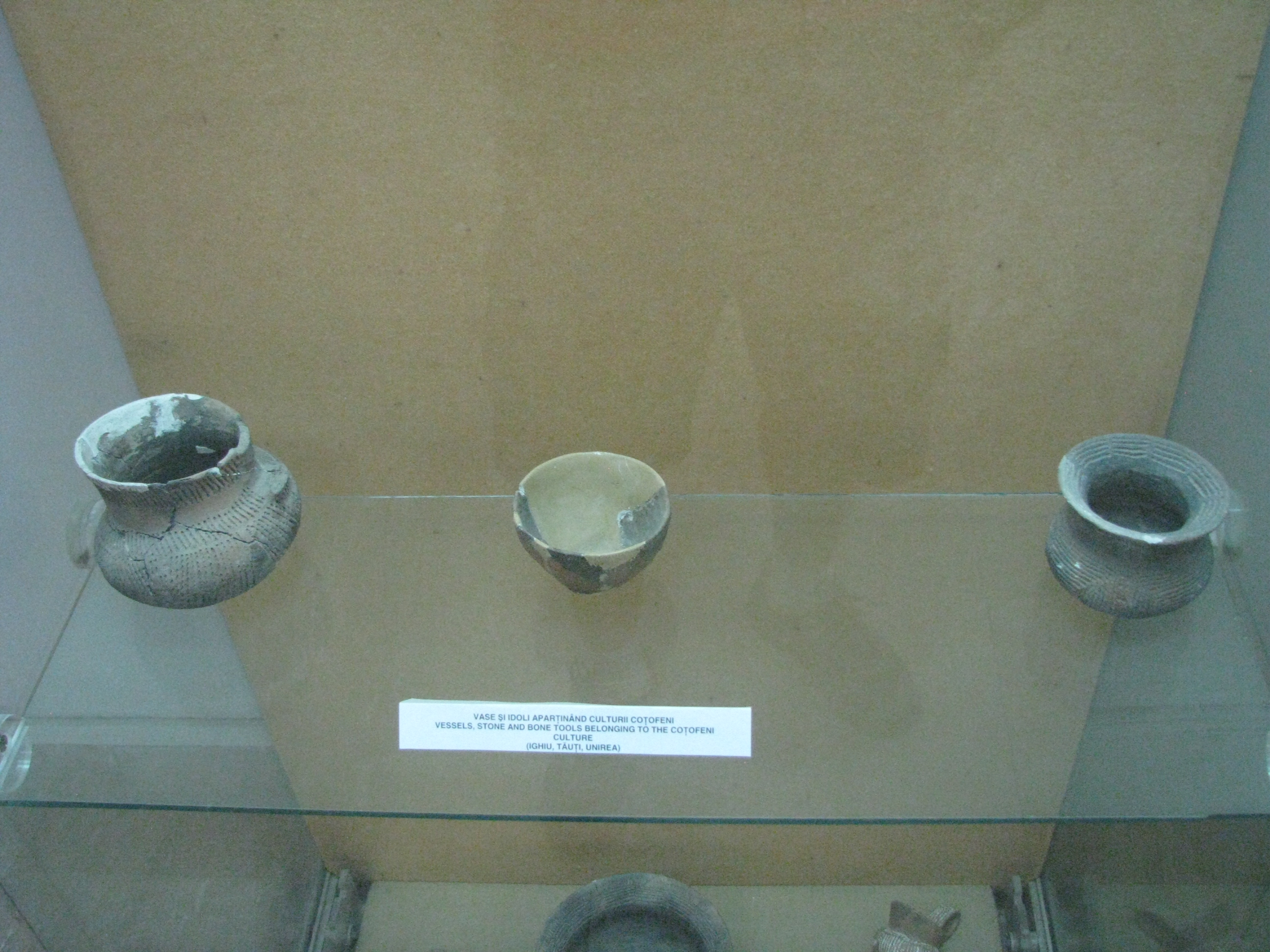
Coțofeni culture vessels from Ighiu, Tăuți, and Unirea.

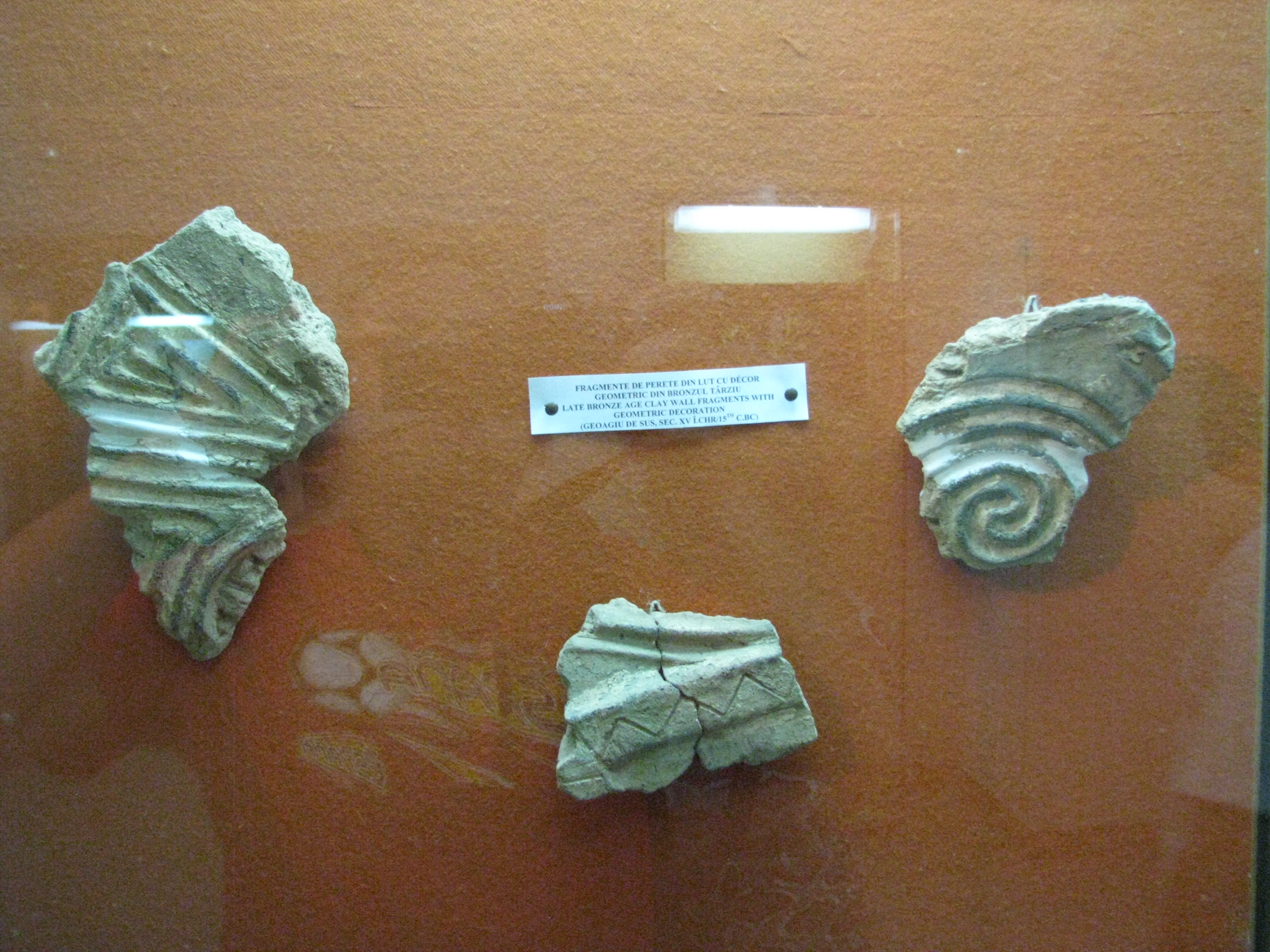
Late Bronze Age clay wall fragments with geometric decoration from Geoagiu de Sus, Alba, 15th century BC

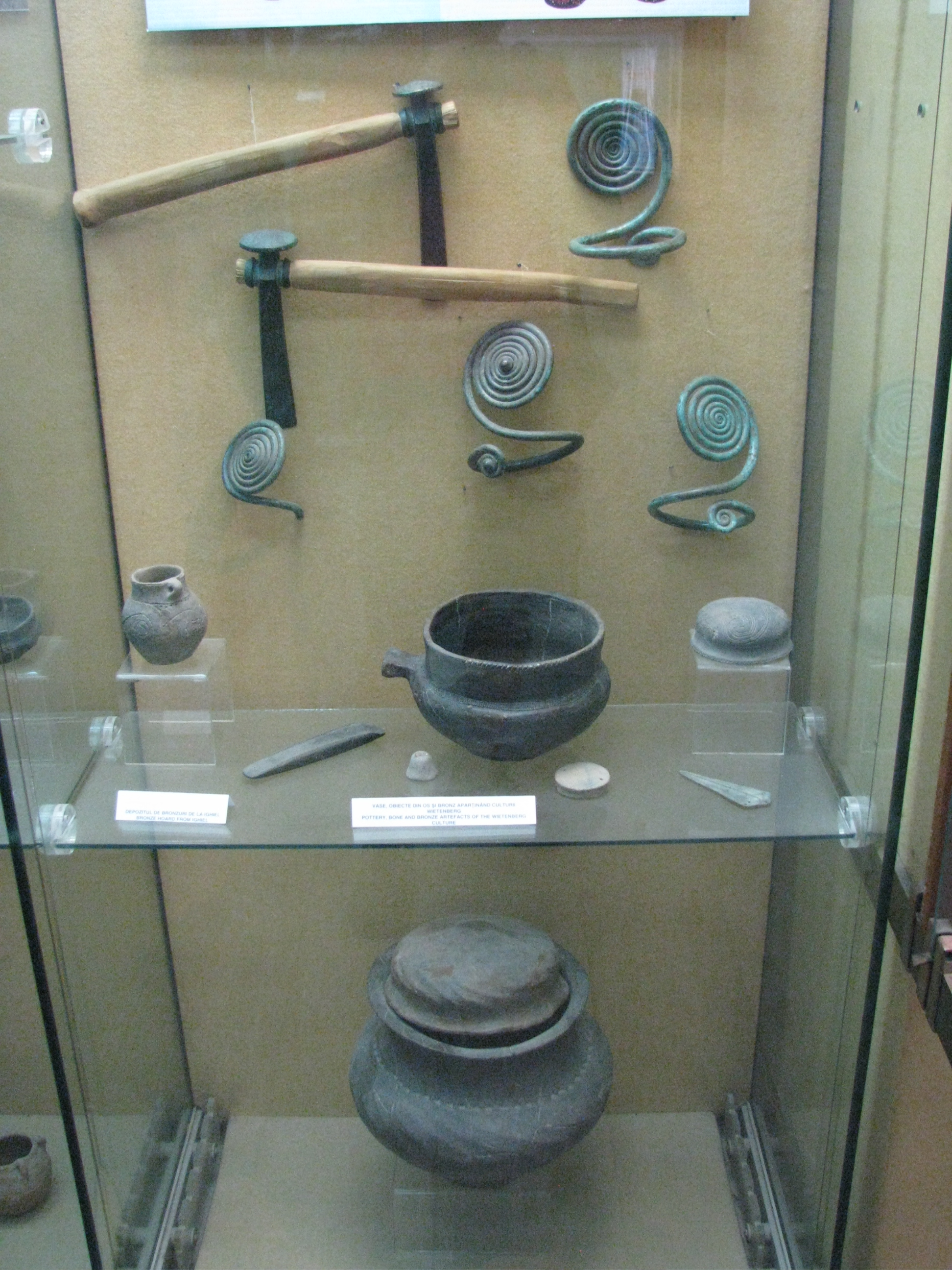
Pottery, bone and bronze artefacts of the Wietenberg culture

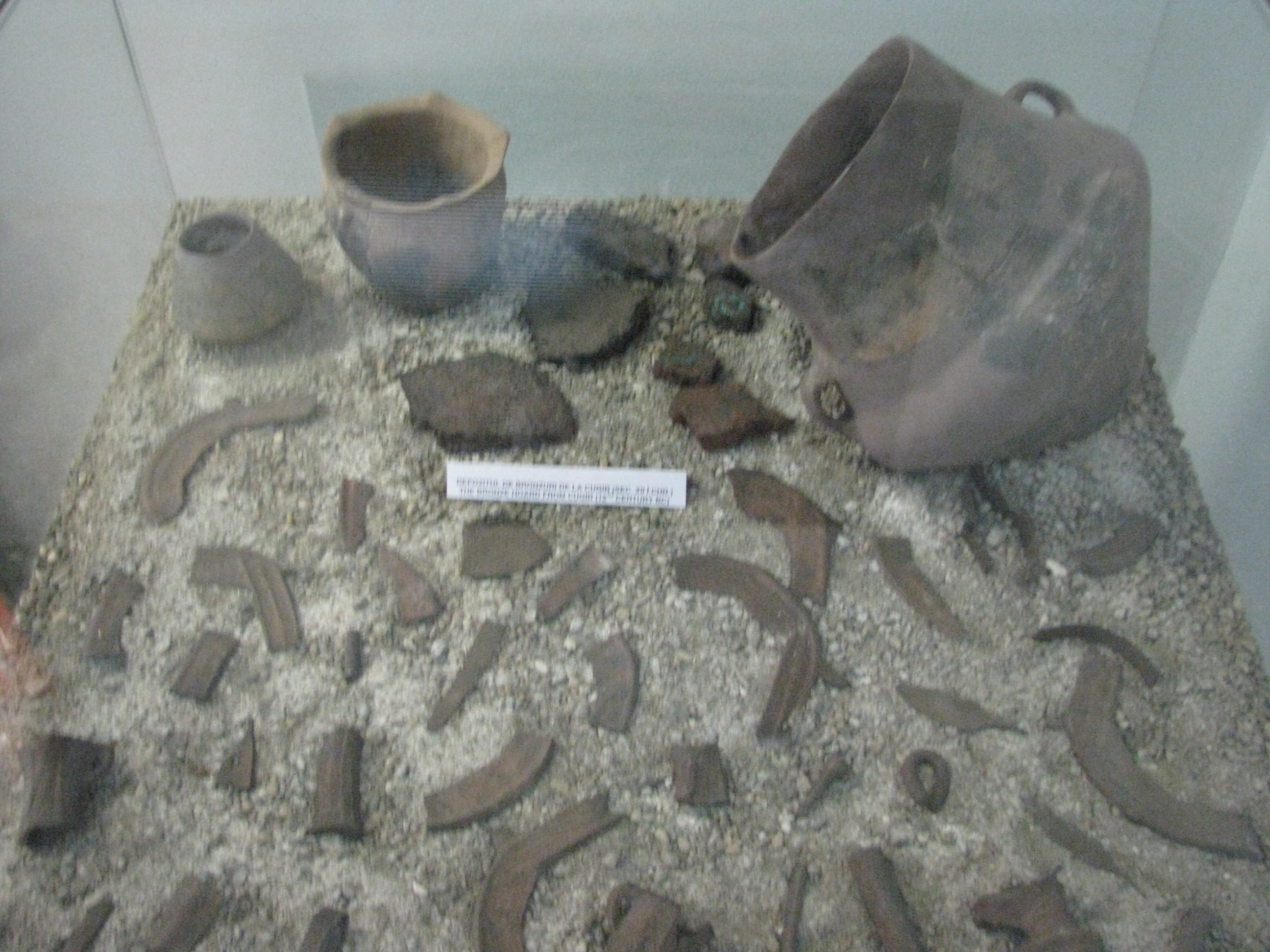
The Bronze Age hoard of Cugir, 12th century BC

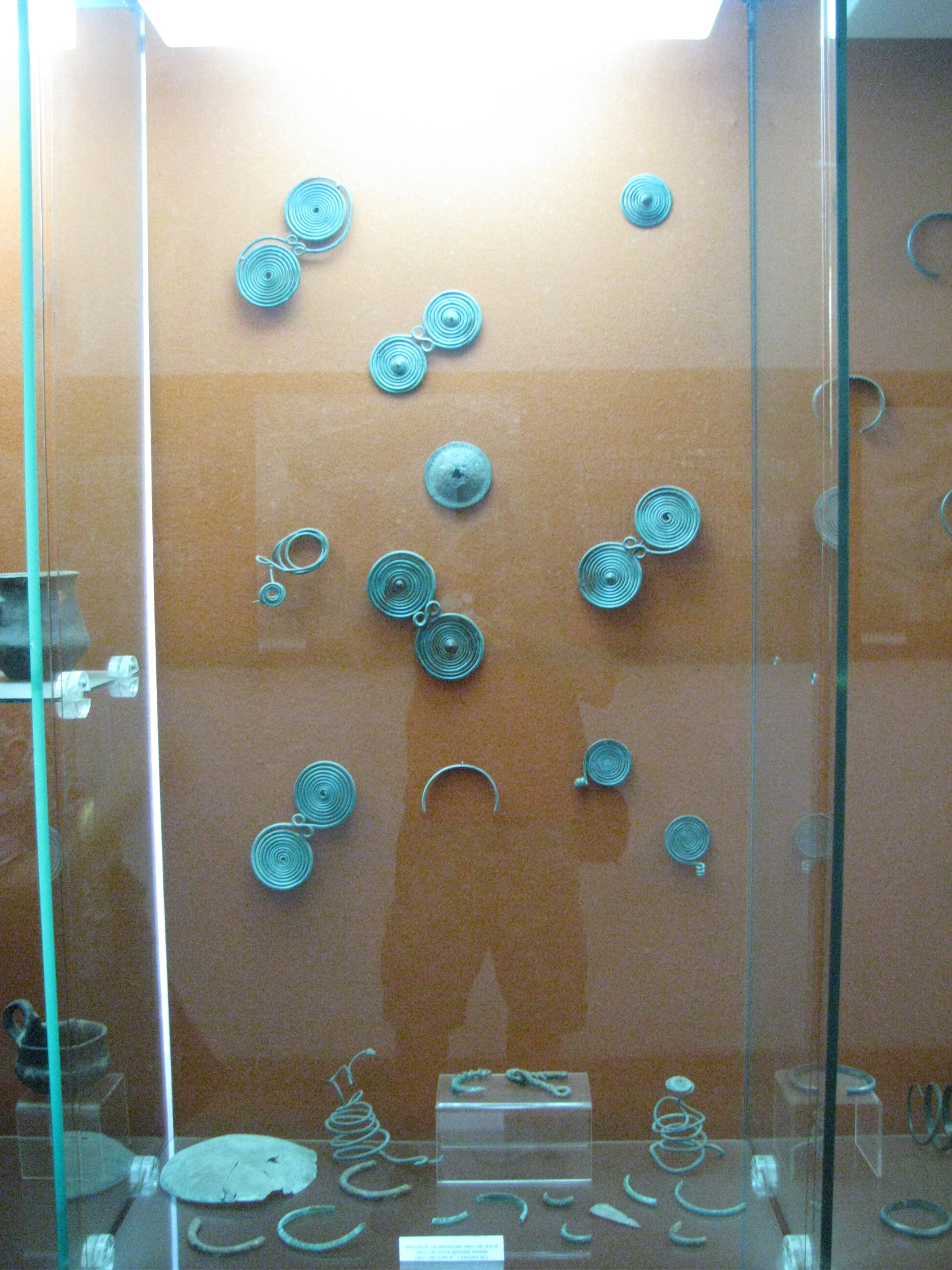
The Bronze Age hoard of Vințu de Jos

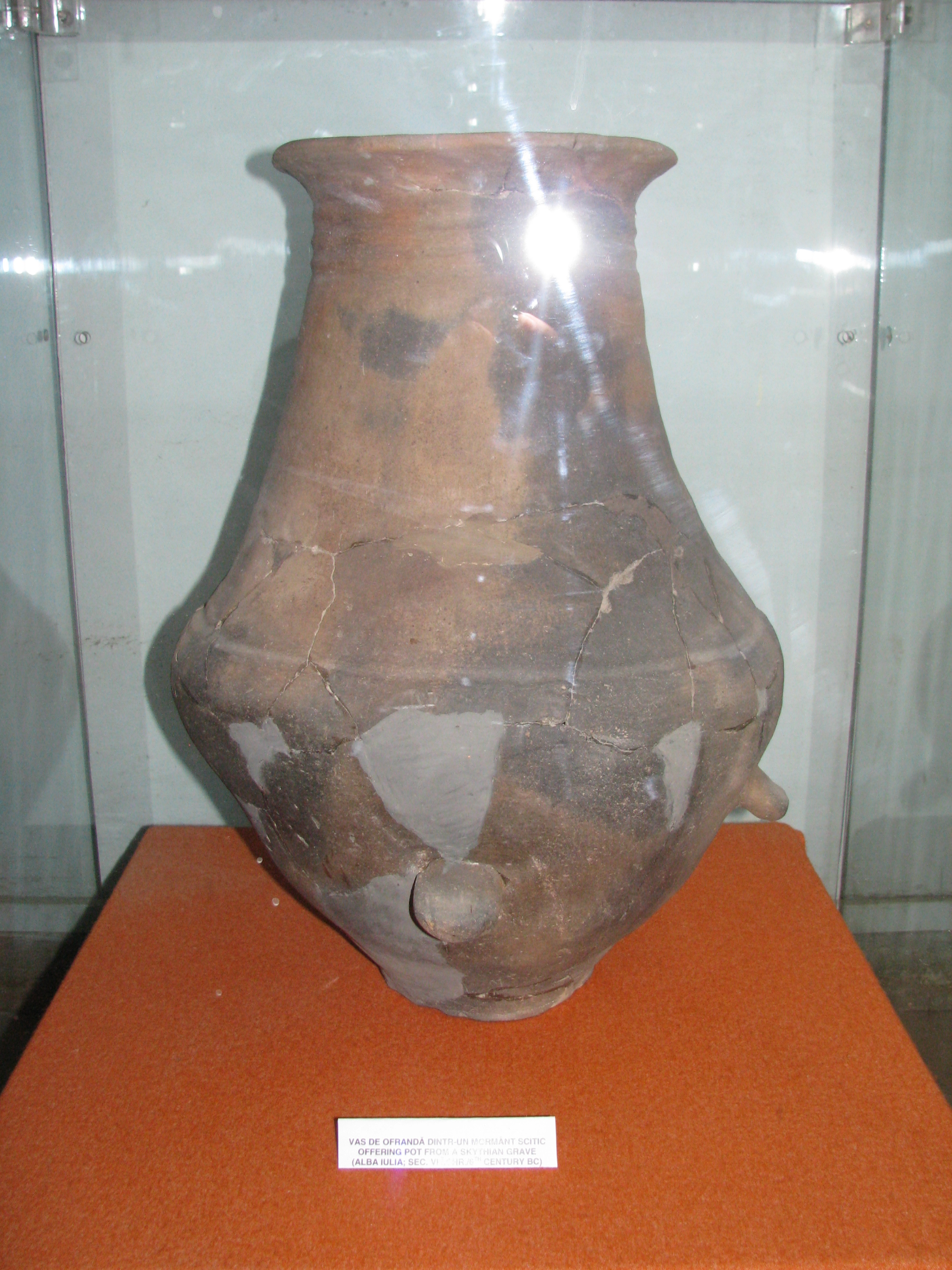
Offering pot from a Scythian grave

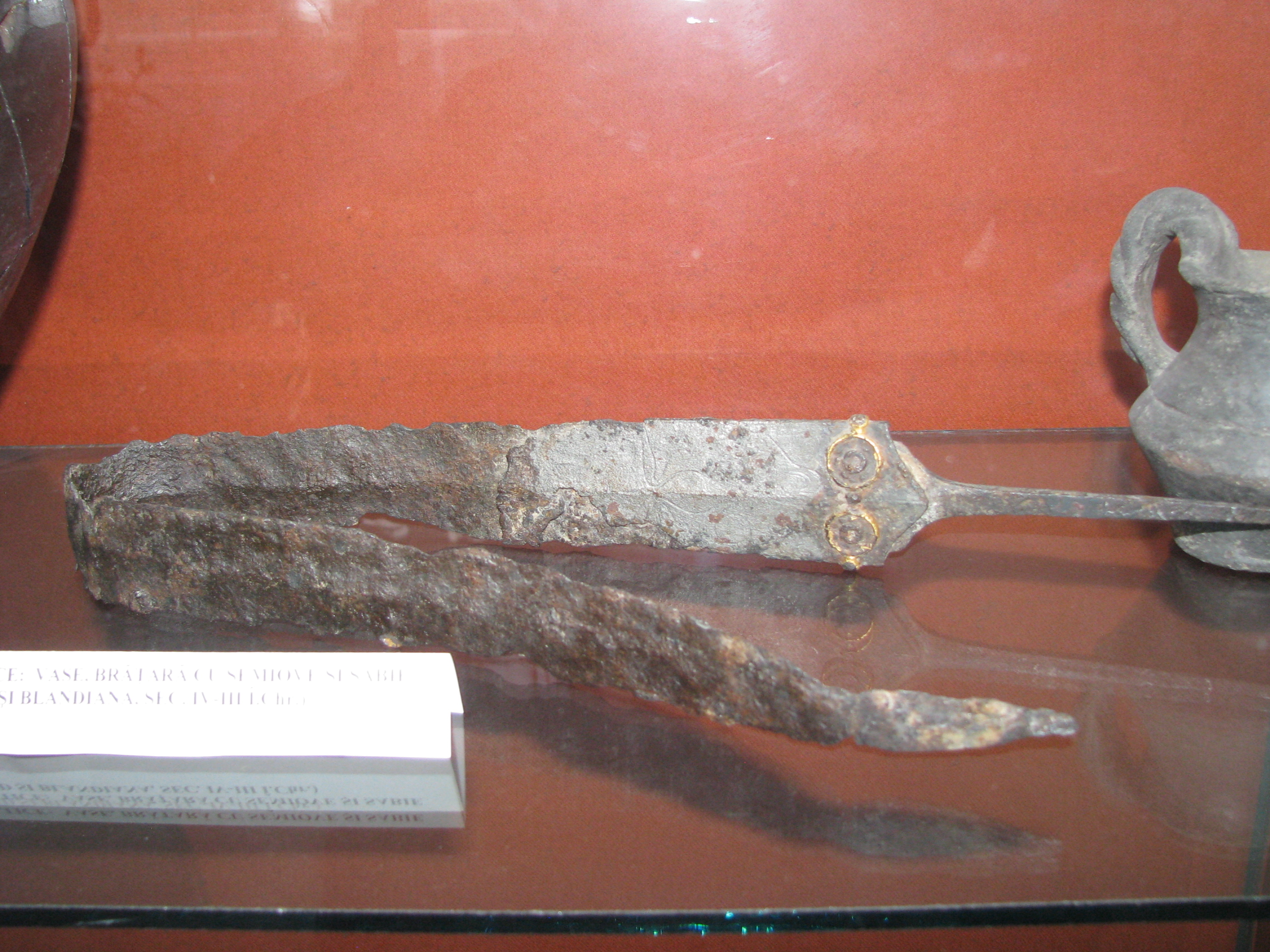
Celtic sword from Aiud and Blandiana

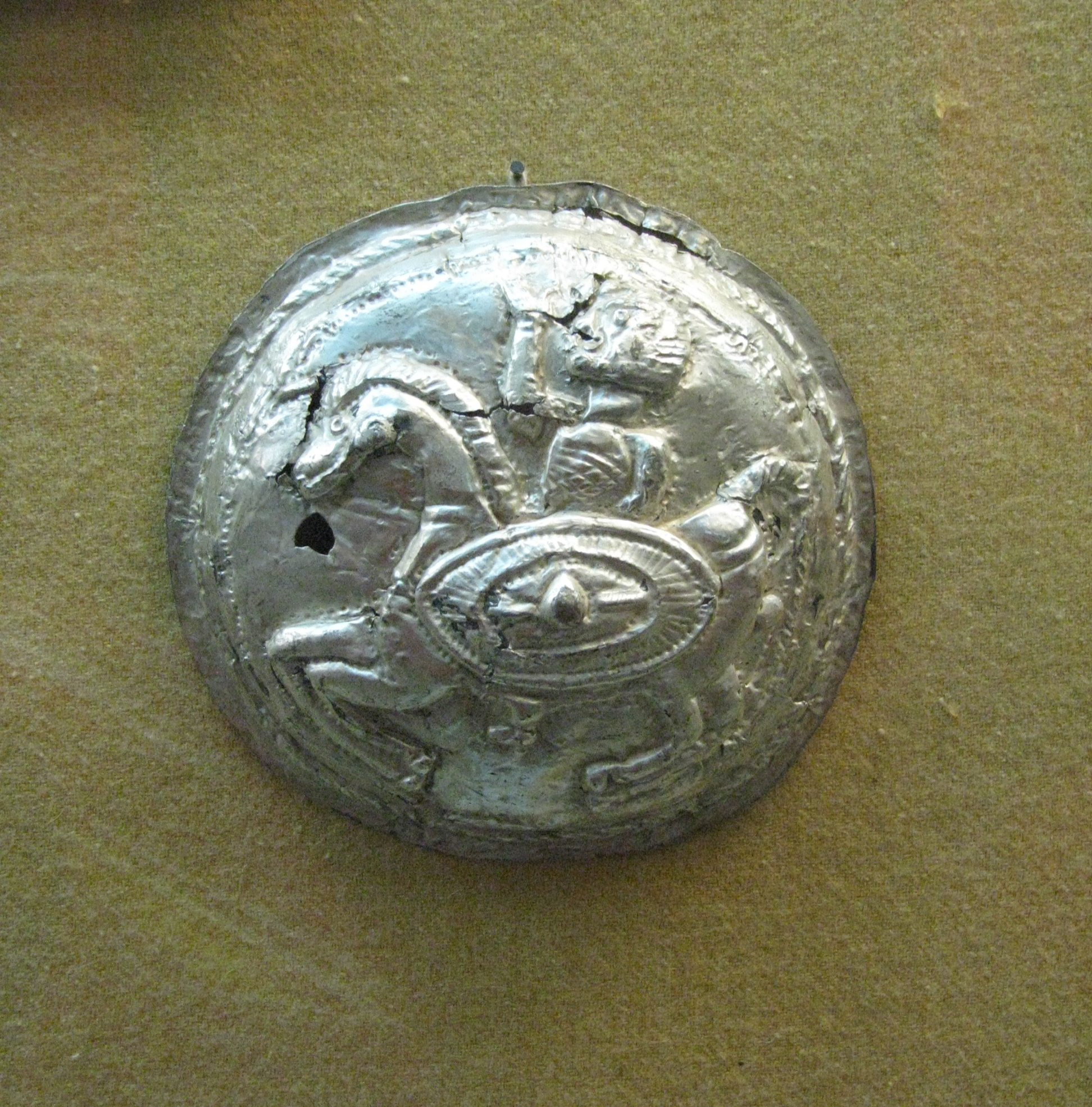
Rider from Dacian silver hoard of Lupu, 1st century BC

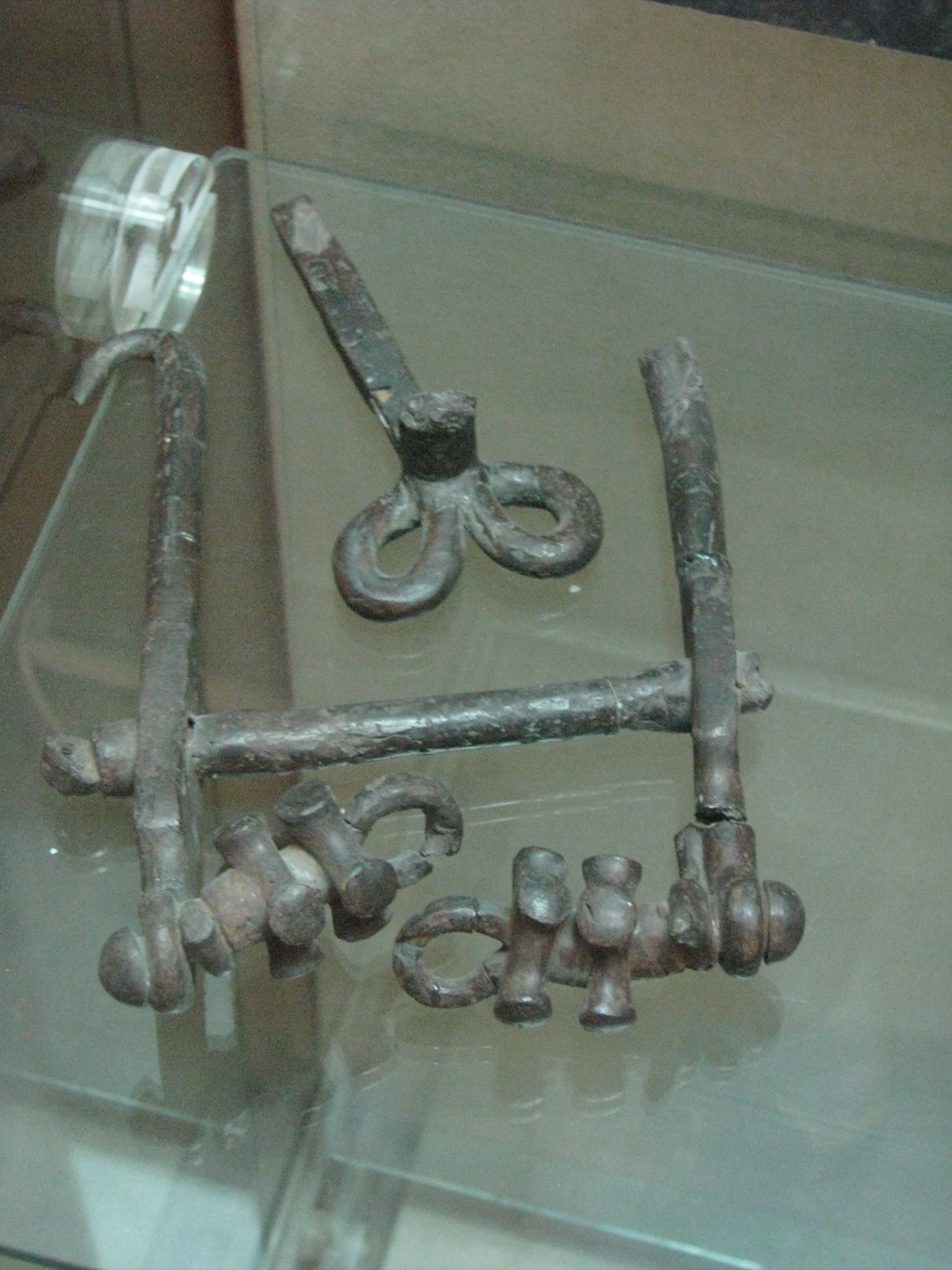
Fragments of chariot and horse equipment from the Dacian warrior tomb of Cugir, dated 1st century BC. They are from the 2 or 4 horse chariot which was cremated with the deceased, together with the horses.

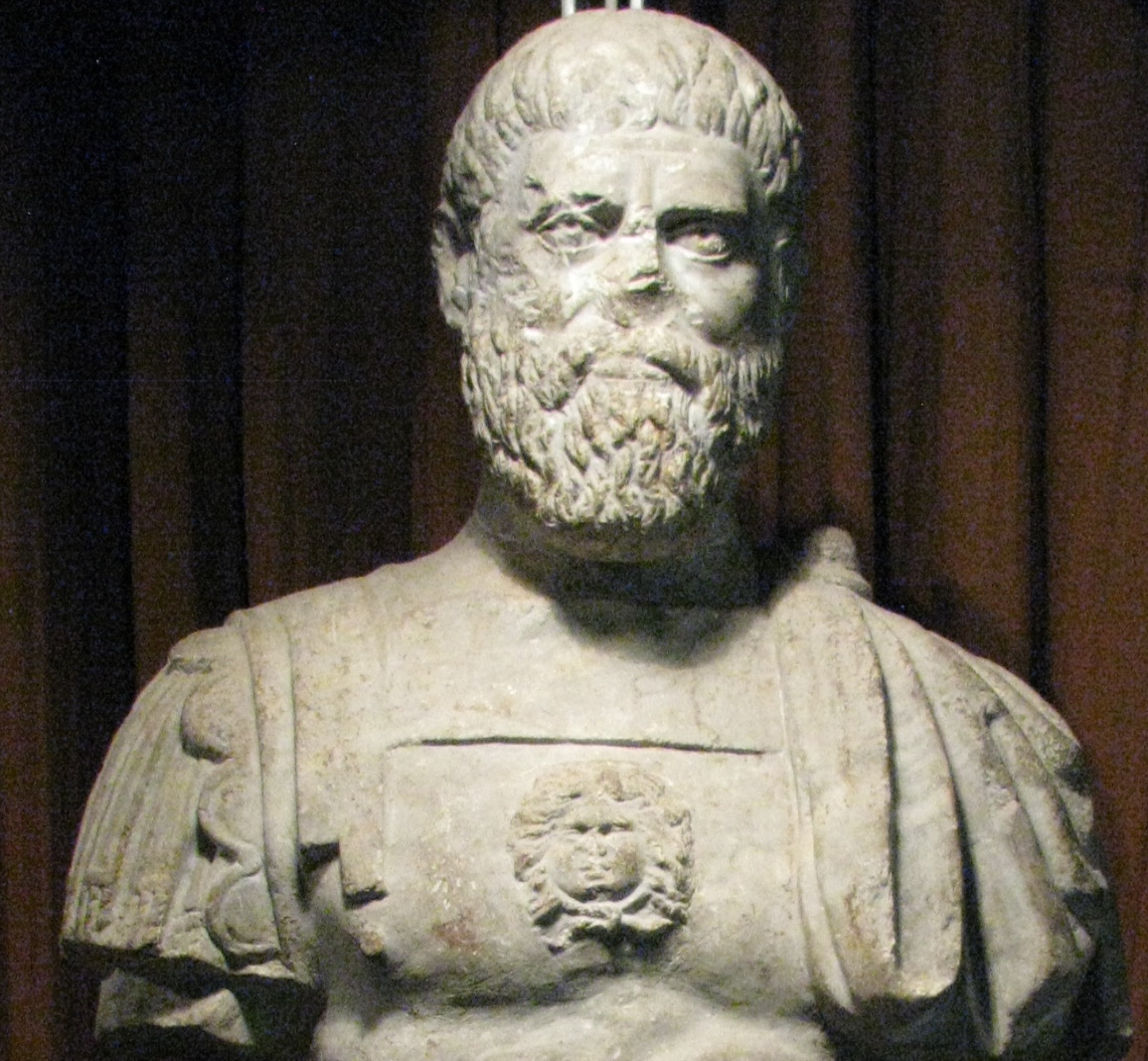
Possible statue of Roman Emperor Pertinax, Apulum

== See also ==
- Apulum
