= Feldioara =

- Commune
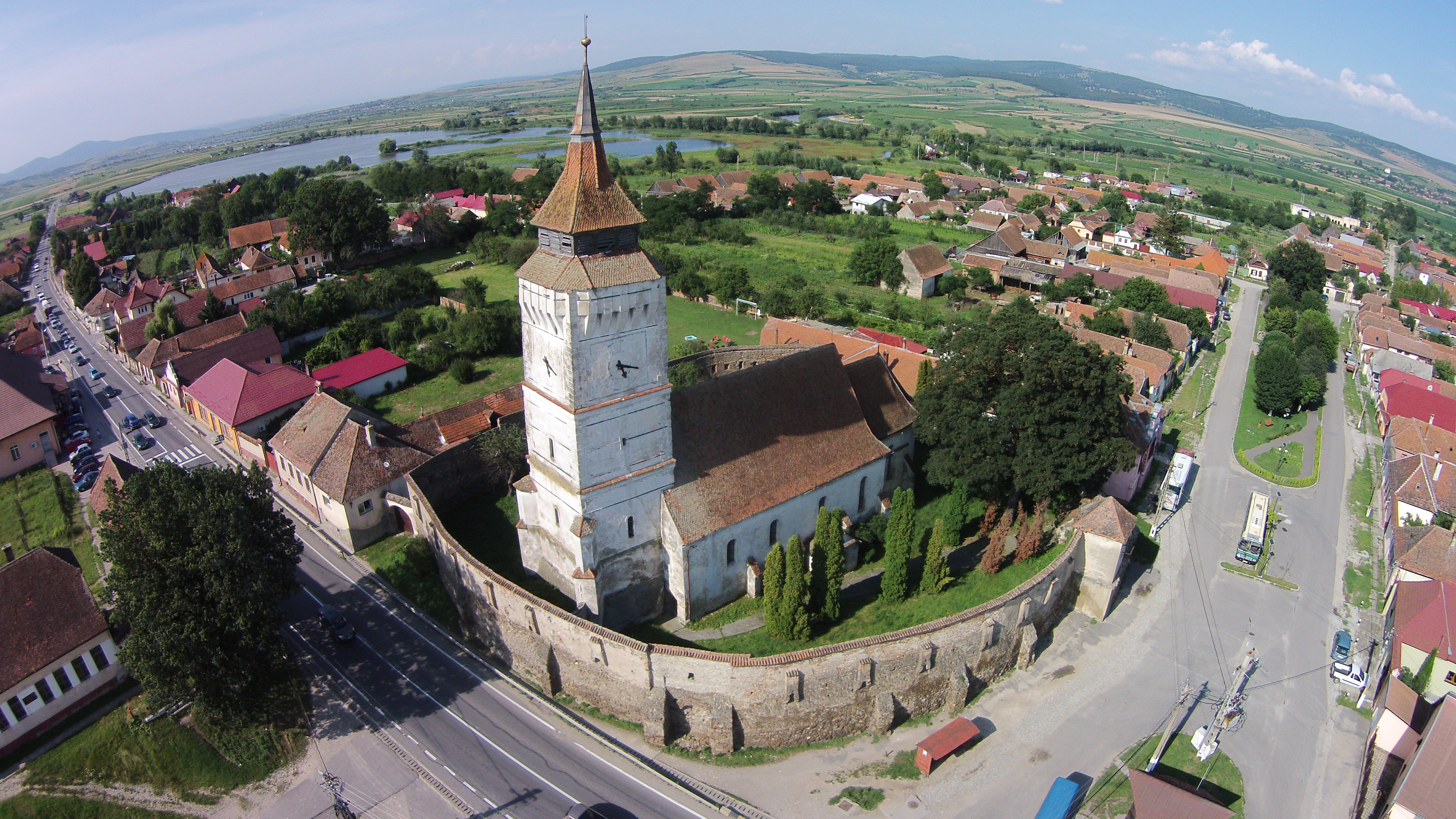
- Fortified Saxon Evangelic church in Rotbav

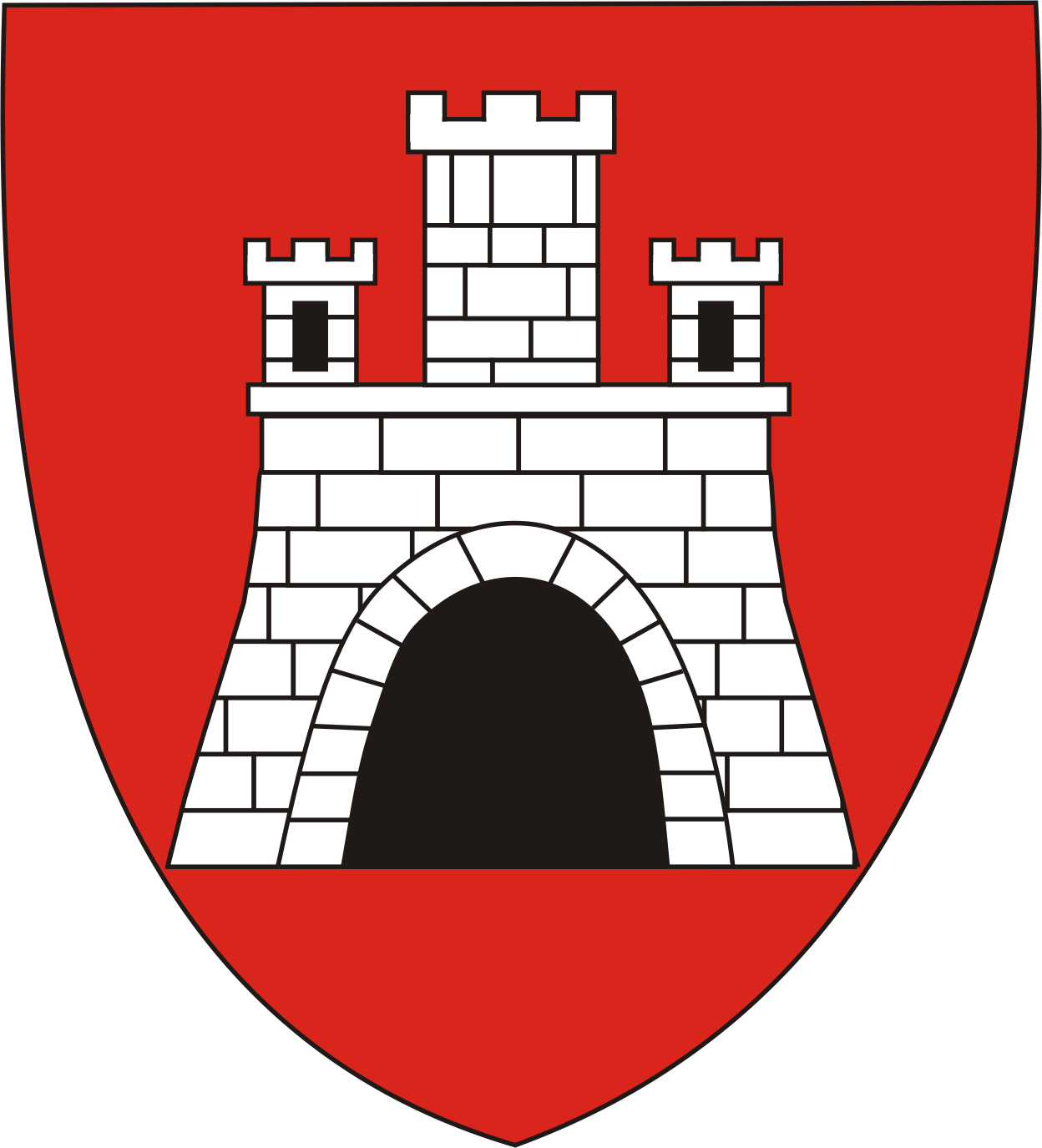
- Coat of arms

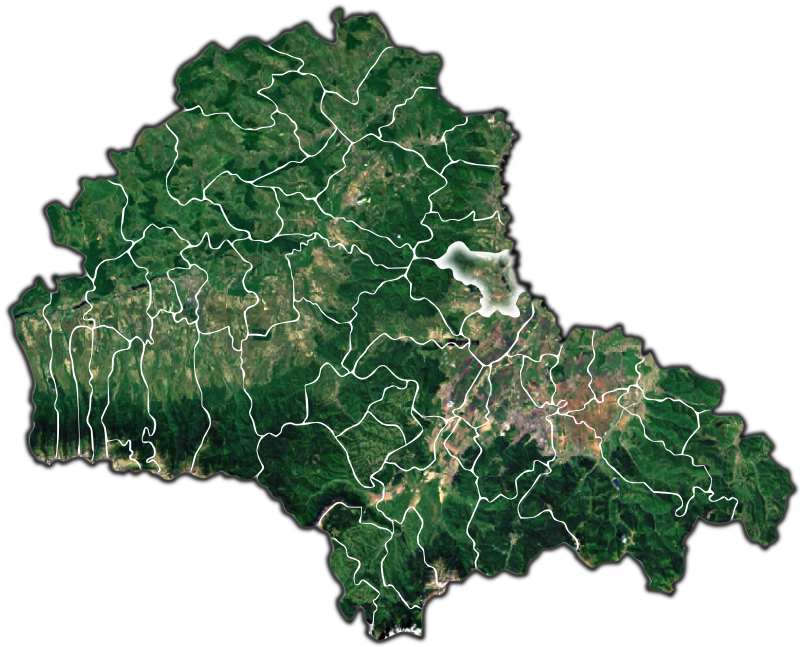
- Location within the county

- Location in Romania
- Coordinates: 45°49′0″N 25°35′30″E
- Country: Romania
- County: Brașov

Government
  - Mayor (2020–2024): Sorin Taus (PNL)
- Area: 75.97 km^{2} (29.33 sq mi)
- Elevation: 389 m (1,276 ft)
- Population (2021-12-01): 6,311
  - Density: 83.07/km^{2} (215.2/sq mi)
- Time zone: UTC+02:00 (EET)
  - Summer (DST): UTC+03:00 (EEST)
- Postal code: 507065
- Area code: (+40) 0268
- Vehicle reg.: BV
- Website: primaria-feldioara.ro

Feldioara is a commune in Brașov County, Transylvania, Romania, about 15 km (9.3 mi) north of the city of Brașov. It is composed of three villages: Colonia Reconstrucția (Bohntelep), Feldioara (German: Marienburg, [maˈʁiːənbʊʁk]; Hungarian: Földvár or Barcaföldvár), and Rotbav (Rothbach; Szászveresmart).

== Geography ==
The commune is located in the east-central part of the county, in the northern reaches of the Burzenland. It is situated on the left bank of the Olt River, which mostly follows the border with Covasna County. The rivers Bârsa and Homorod discharge into the Olt near Feldioara.

The commune is crossed by national road DN13, which links Brașov with Sighișoara and Târgu Mureș. Road DN13E branches off in Feldioara, passes through Sfântu Gheorghe (26 km (16 mi) to the east) and Covasna, and ends in Întorsura Buzăului. The train stations in Feldioara and Rotbav serve the CFR Main Line 300, which connects Bucharest with the Hungarian border near Oradea.

== Name ==
=== Feldioara ===
Feldioara has a medieval fortress long believed to have been built by the Teutonic Knights. However, more recent studies show that the Fortress in Feldioara was actually constructed by the local community. The name of the village comes from the Hungarian word földvár, which means "the clay fortress". The ruins of the fortress can still be seen today. The German name Marienburg means "fortress of the Virgin Mary".

=== Rotbav ===
Rotbav is the Romanian name of the formerly Saxon village of Roiderbrich (Transylvanian-Saxon name), called Rothbach in German and (Szász-)Veresmart and (Szász-)Vörösmárt in Hungarian, Szász meaning Saxon.

=== Colonia Reconstrucția ===
Colonia Reconstrucția is the Romanian Communist-era name of a workers' settlement established in the 1930s around a new brick factory and initially called after it, Colonia Bohn in Romanian and Bohntelep in Hungarian. The company running the factory was nationalised by the new Communist regime in 1948 and the factory was renamed Reconstruția ('Reconstruction'), with the settlement being administratively detached in the 1950s from the village of Feldioara under the name of Colonia Reconstruția.

== History ==
At "La Pârâuț" in Rotbav, archaeologists discovered an important Bronze Age site with six distinct occupation layers.

=== Feldioara: the Marienburg fortress ===
==== German Knights', then Saxon stronghold ====
Between 1211 and 1225, Marienburg ('Castle of Mary') was the Teutonic Order's quarter in Burzenland; their Ordensburg would later become a Saxon peasants' stronghold. A 1439 document states that the civilians of Feldioara built this fortress "with great financial and physical expenses" in order to protect their families and possessions. The fortress withstood the Turkish invasion of 1421, but it was severely damaged by a second invasion in 1432. It took until 1457 to restore it.

==== Second Battle of Marienburg (1612) ====
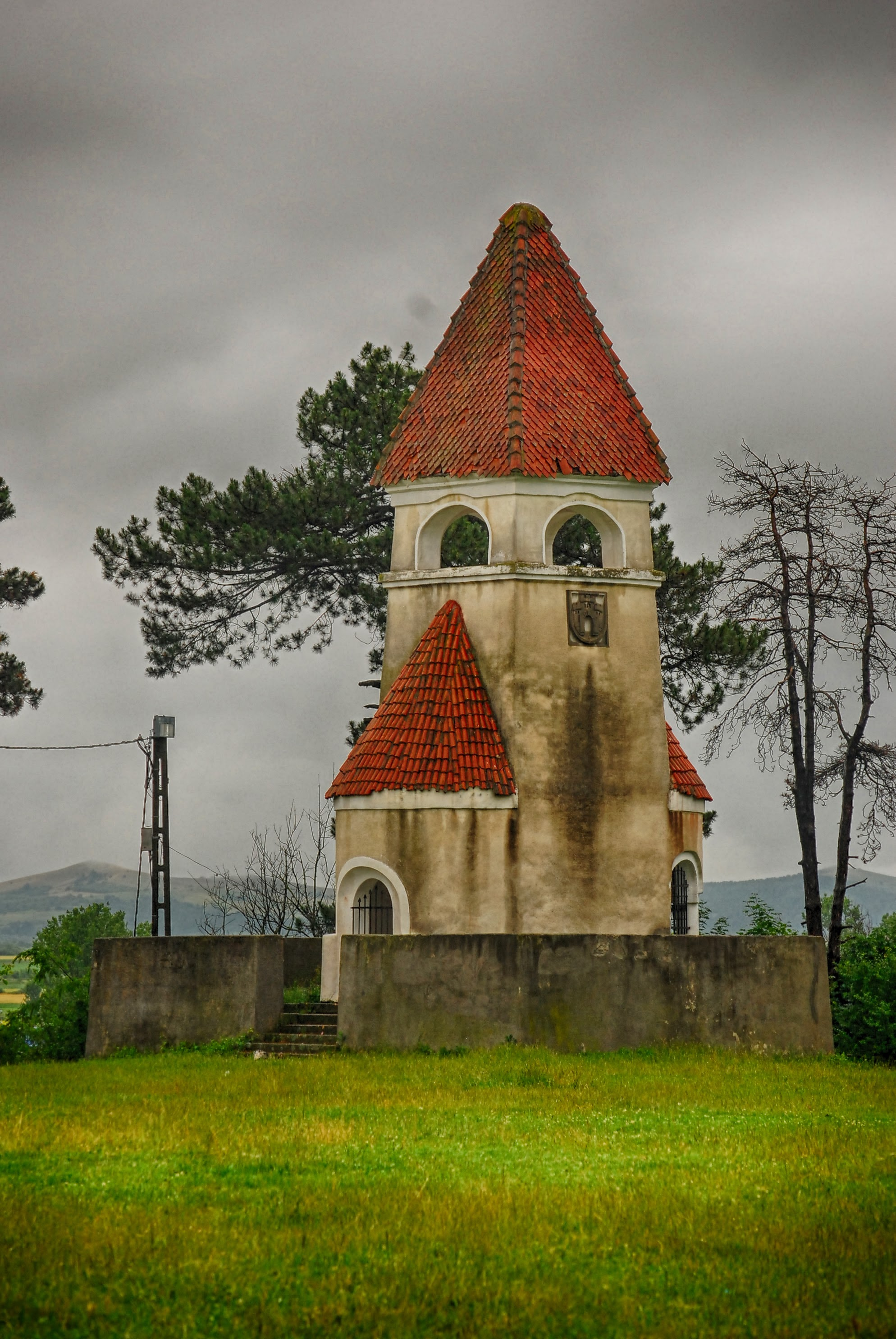
1913 monument to the Saxon students of Kronstadt's high school fallen in 1612 in Feldioara

During the battles of 1612, the armies led by Prince Gabriel Báthori conquered the fortress, and in September the army of Kronstadt (Brașov) had Marienburg under siege for three days.

On September 16, 1612, a battle was fought between the regular, mainly Hungarian army led by Báthori, and the Kronstadt host led by city judge Michael Weiss, consisting mainly of motivated, but militarily undertrained Saxons - burghers of Kronstadt and Burzenland peasants -, but also of local Hungarians and Szeklers, supported by Bathori's rival, András Géczi, by cavalry sent by Radu Mihnea of Wallachia (the first to give way when they came under attack), and a hodgepodge of unreliable mercenaries. The Saxons lost the fight and Weiss was killed on the battlefield. This is known as the Second Battle of Marienburg, the first one being fought in 1529.

==== Later history of the fortress ====
The fortress – long out use for its original purpose – was used as a granary until 1838, when a major earthquake damaged it. After this event, even the fortress guardian left the building. Since then the fortress has lain in ruins.

In 2013-2017, the ruined fortress has been renovated and rebuilt.

=== Colonia Reconstrucția ===
In 1936, the Bohn & Co. Brick and Tile Factory from Jimbolia founded a subsidiary on the outskirts of Feldioara. A workers' settlement began to develop in the vicinity of the new brick factory, with Romanian and Hungarian workers moving in. Its Romanian name was Colonia Bohn, and Bohntelep its Hungarian name.

In 1948, the factory was nationalised and renamed Reconstrucția ('Reconstruction'). At that time, 380 workers worked there and produced 16 million bricks and 5 million roof tiles a year.

In the 1950s, the settlement separated from Feldioara under the name Colonia Reconstrucția. In 1956, it had 754 inhabitants, and in 1977 it had already 1,067 (523 Hungarians and 512 Romanians). The population then started to decrease, in 2011 sinking to 647 inhabitants.

== Demographics ==
Historical population
Year	Pop.	±%
2002	6,435	—
2011	6,154	−4.4%
2021	6,311	+2.6%
Source: Census data

At the 2011 census, Feldioara had 6,154 inhabitants; of those, 88.8% were Romanians, 6.9% Hungarians, and 3.5% Roma. At the 2021 census, the commune had a population of 6,311, of which 84.3% were Romanians, 3.6% Hungarians, and 3.23% Roma.

== Natives ==
- Edith Soterius von Sachsenheim (1887–1970), painter

== See also ==
- List of fortified churches in Transylvania
- Villages with fortified churches in Transylvania
- List of castles in Romania
- Rotbav Bronze Age site
- Dacian fortress of Feldioara
