= Wietenberg culture =

Middle Bronze Age archeological culture in Transylvania

- Geographical range: Romania (Transylvania)
- Period: Bronze Age
- Dates: c. 2200 BC – 1500 BC
- Preceded by: Coțofeni culture, Usatove culture
- Followed by: Noua-Sabatinovka culture

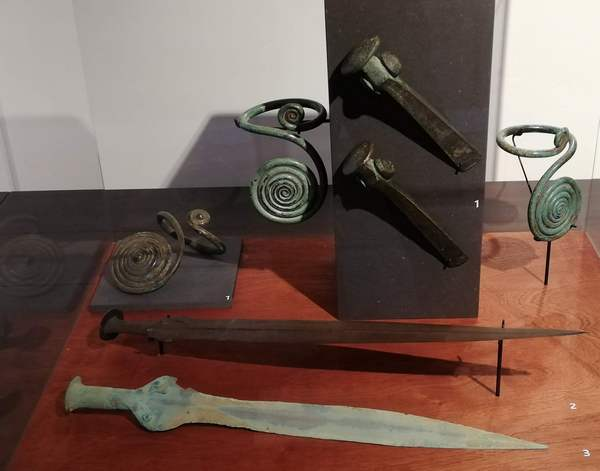
Ighiel hoard, 17th century BC

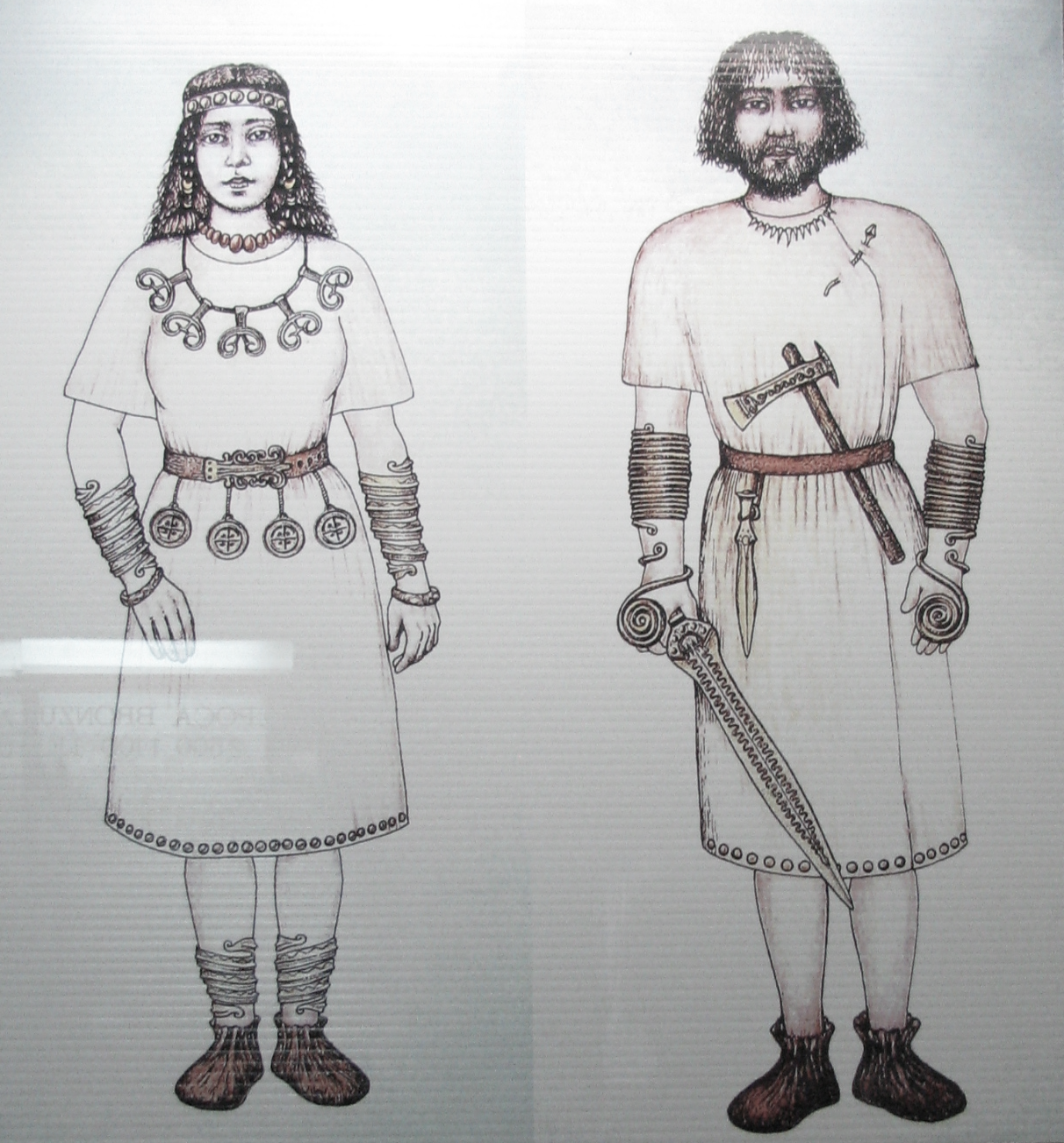
Wietenberg culture dress and artefacts

The Wietenberg culture was a Middle Bronze Age archeological culture in central Romania (Transylvania) that roughly dates to 2200–1600/1500 BCE. Representing a local variant of Usatove culture, it was contemporary with the Ottomány culture and Unetice culture and was replaced by the Noua culture. Its name was coined after the eponymic Wietenberg Hill near Sighișoara.

People of this culture traded with the Mycenaeans. Burial sites contain bronze battle axes and maces with stone heads. Pottery consists of amphorae with spiral and meandric ornament.

By 1964, about 200 settlements of this culture were discovered.

== Gallery ==
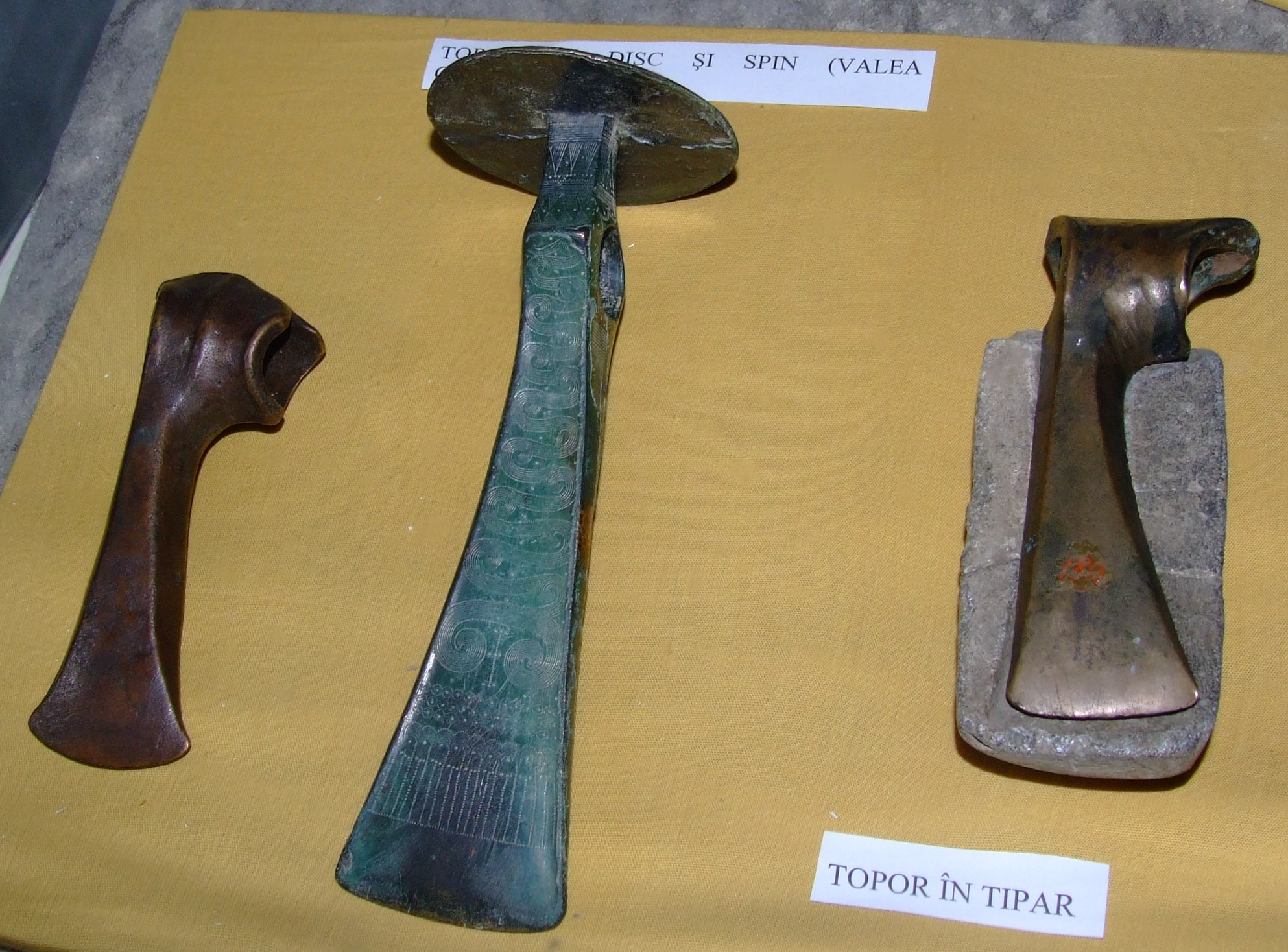
Battle axes from Valea Chioarului, Maramureș County (National Museum of Transylvanian History in Cluj)

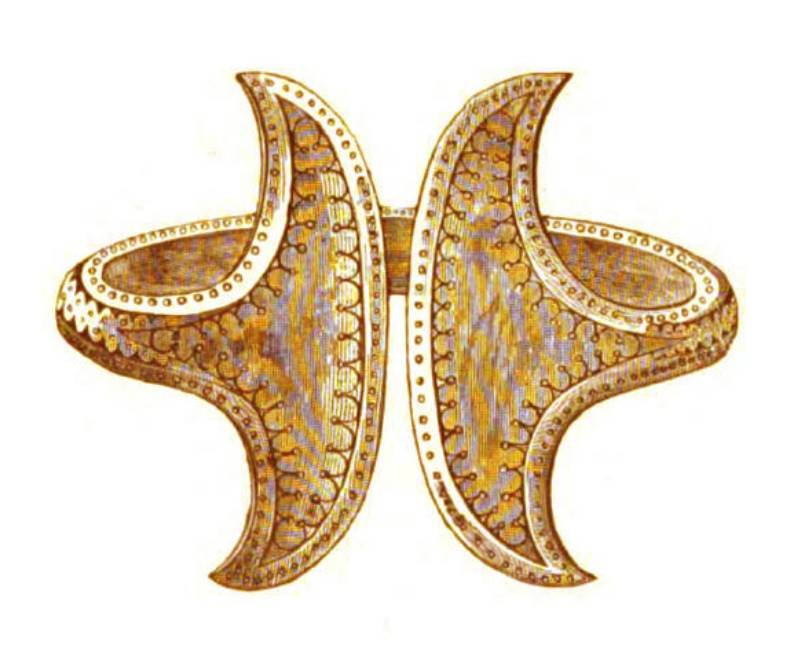
Gold bracelet (from pre-WWI book plate)

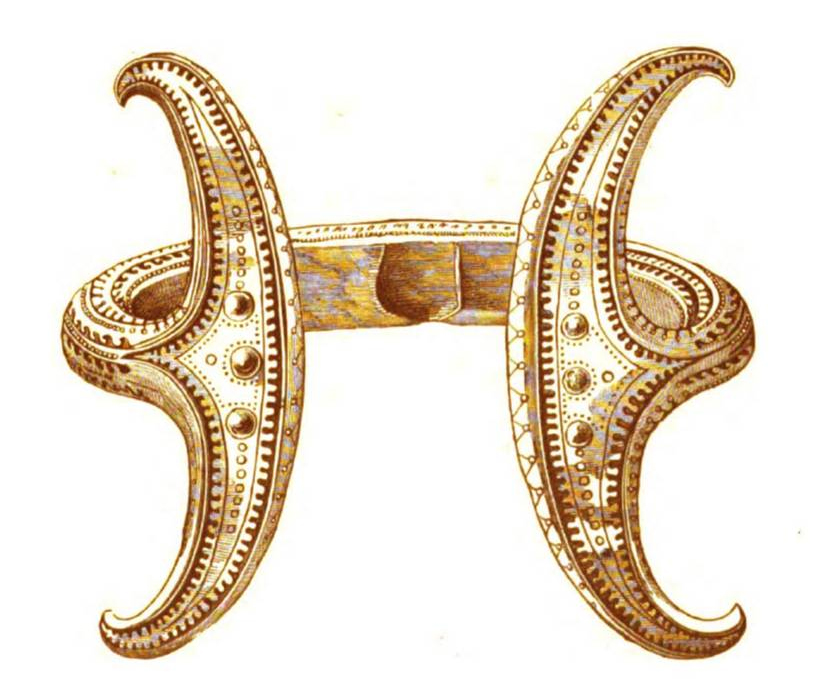
Gold bracelet from Biia, Alba County, c. 1600 BC (from pre-WWI book plate)

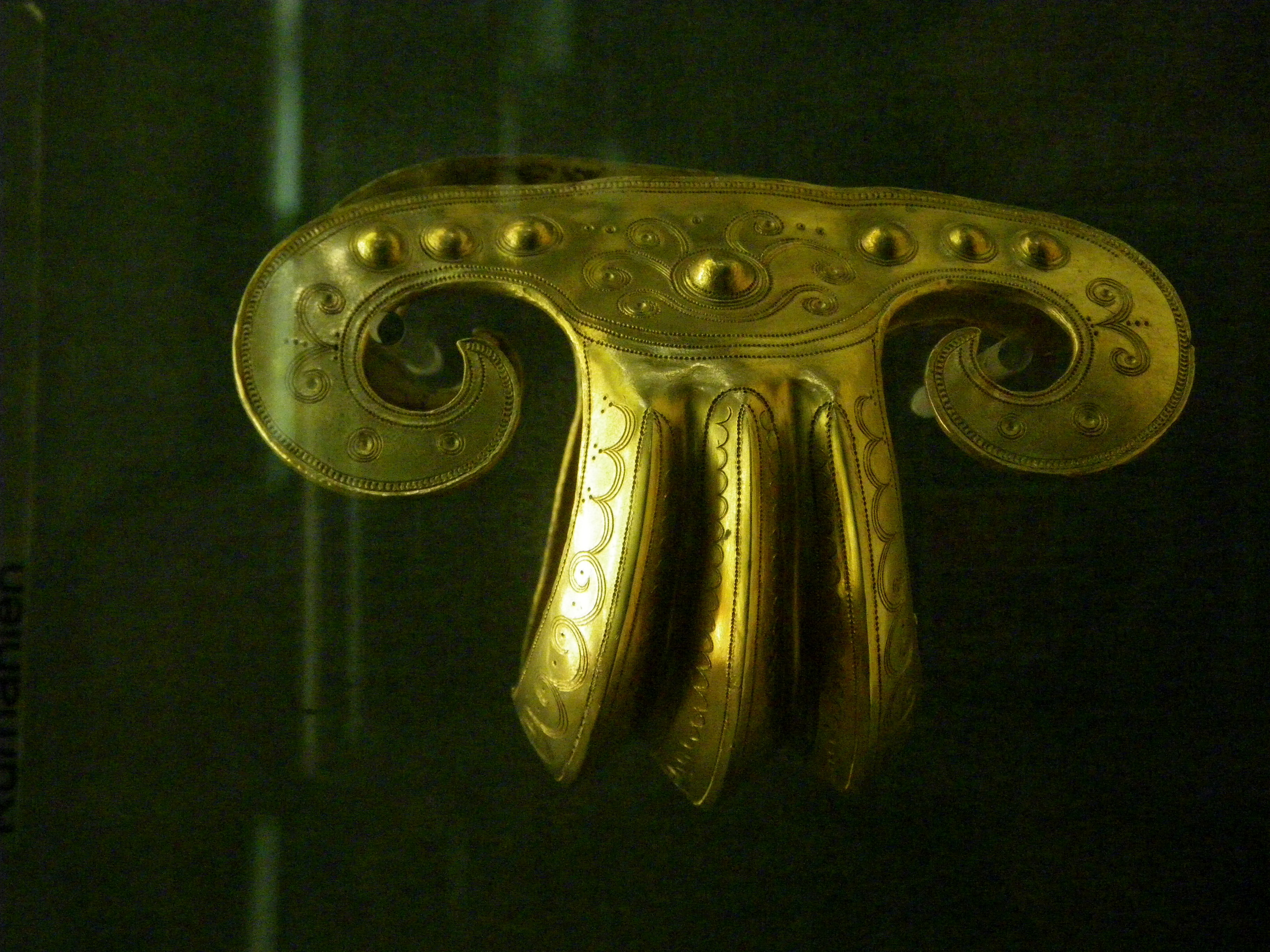
Gold bracelet (Natural History Museum, Vienna)

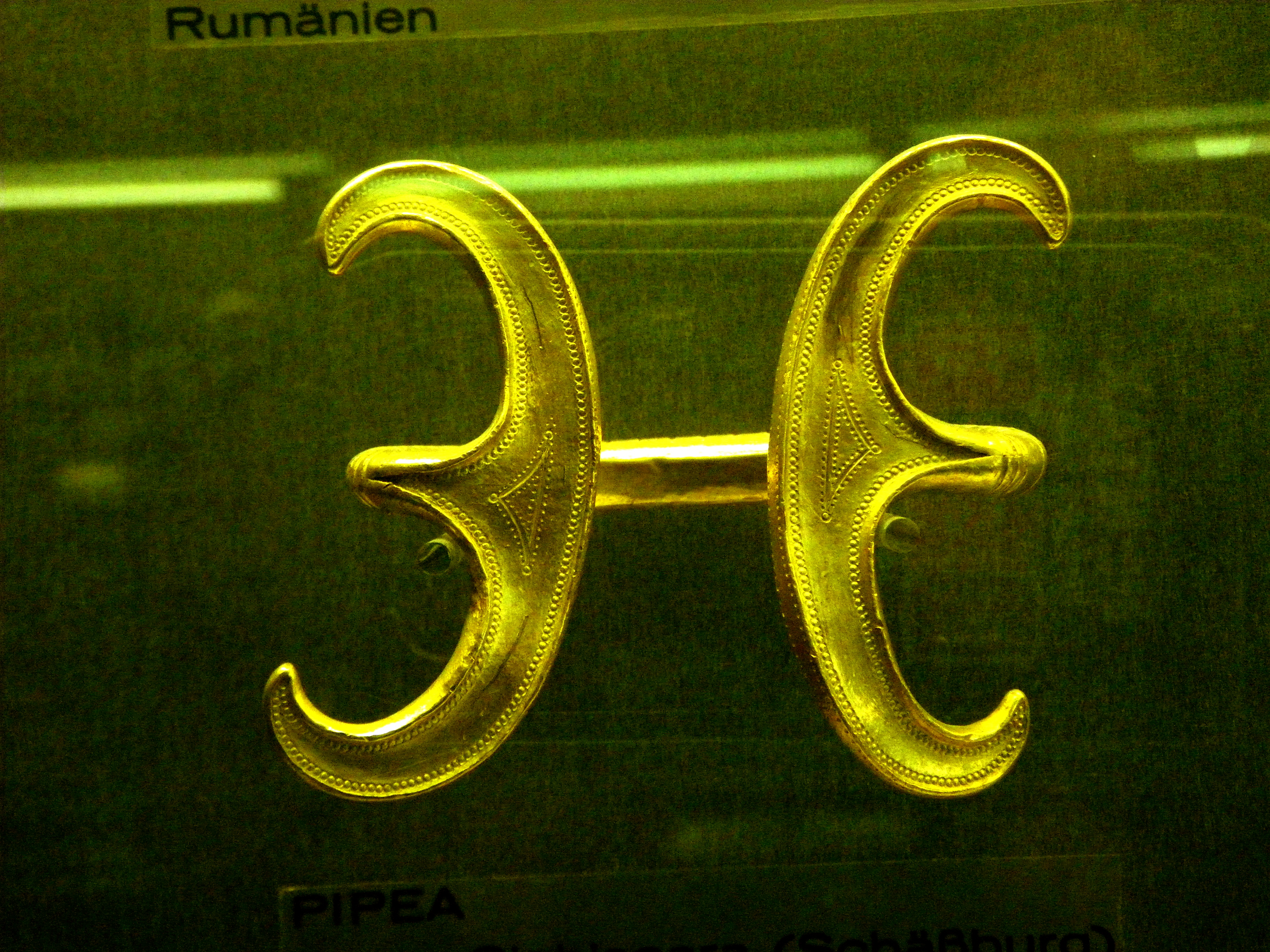
Gold armring (Natural History Museum, Vienna)

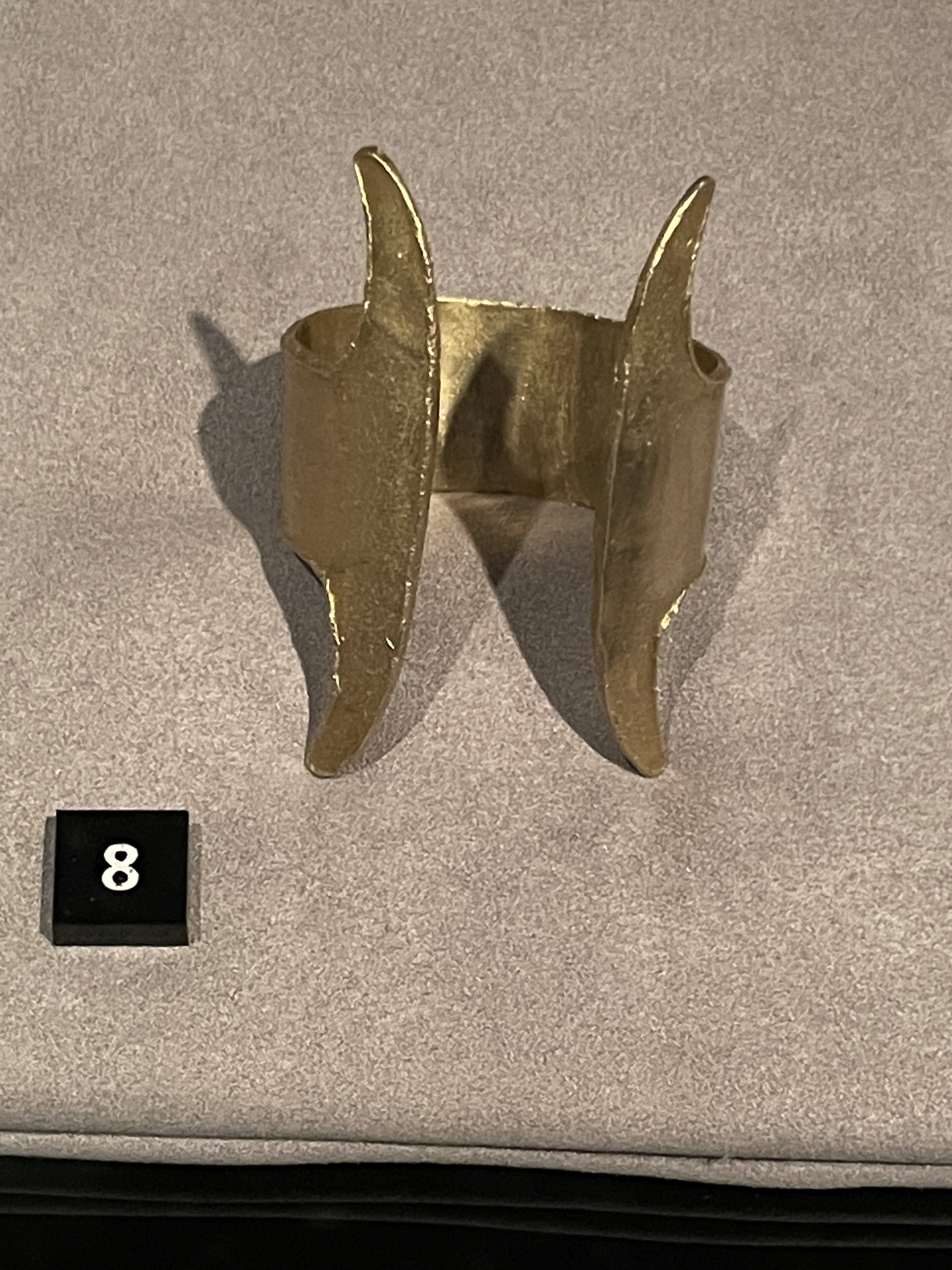
Gold armband

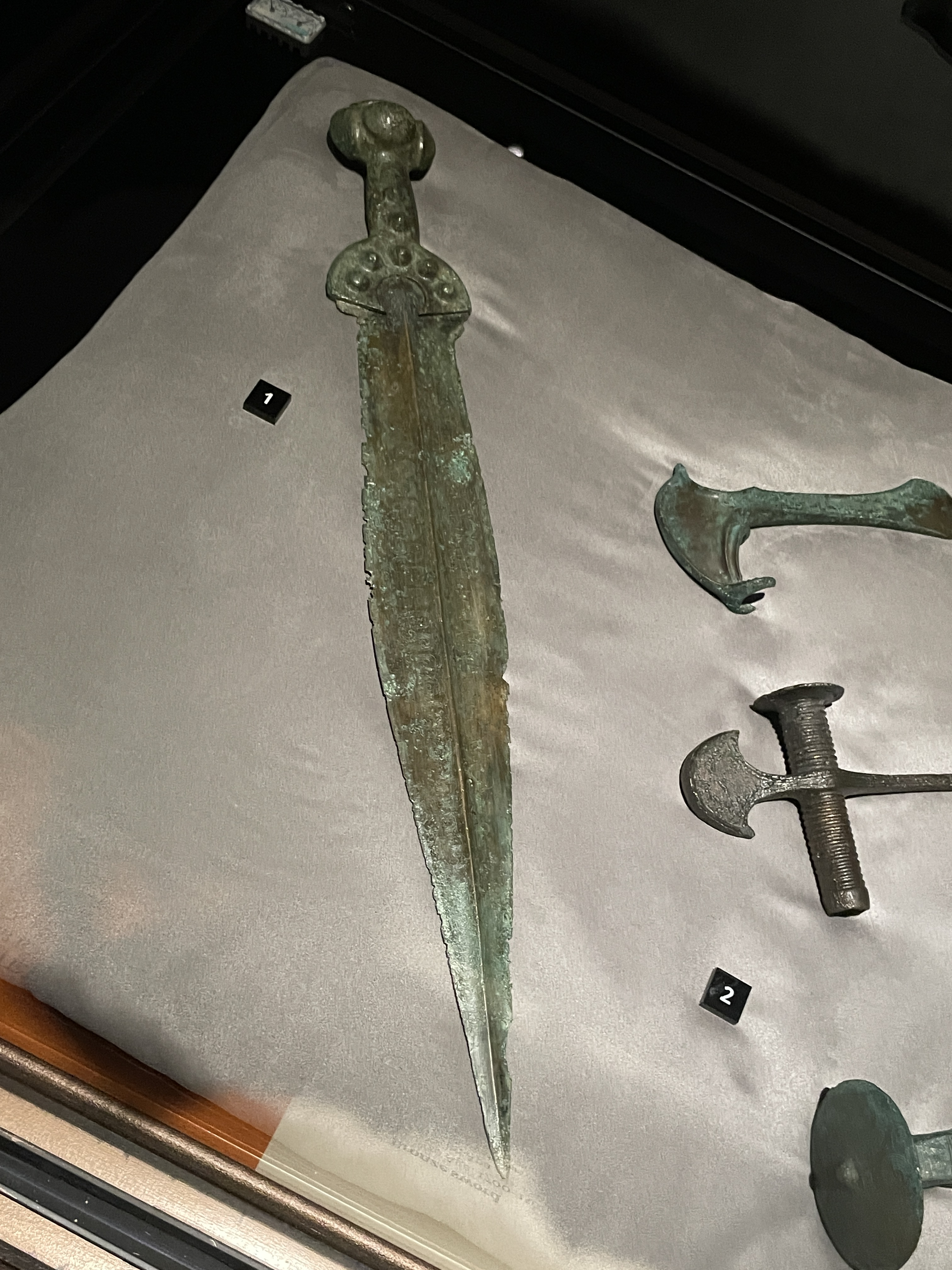
Hajdúsámson-Apa-type sword, from Apa, Satu Mare, 17th century BC

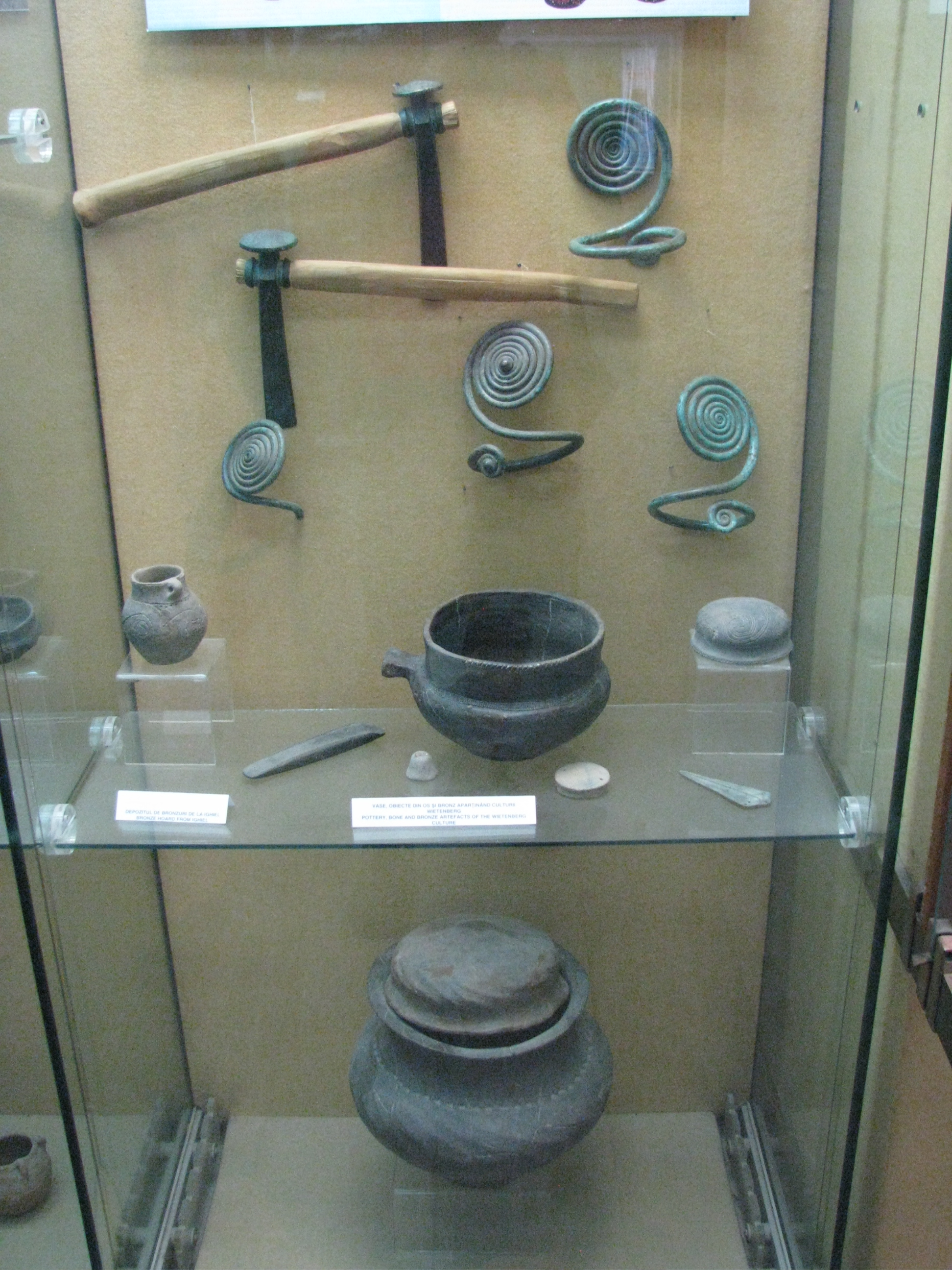
Pottery, bone and bronze artefacts (National Museum of the Union, Alba Iulia)

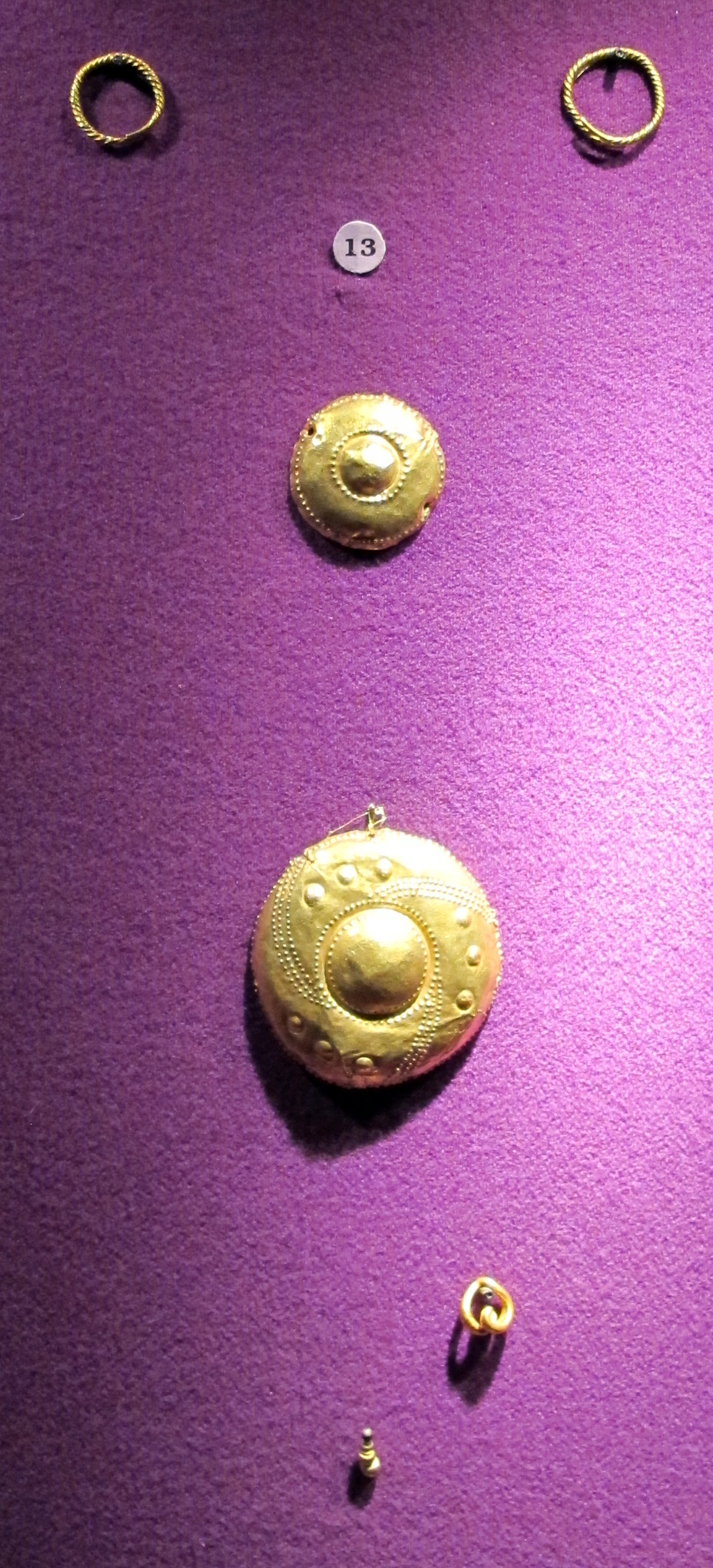
Gold treasure from Șmig, Sibiu County, 17th-16th c. BC

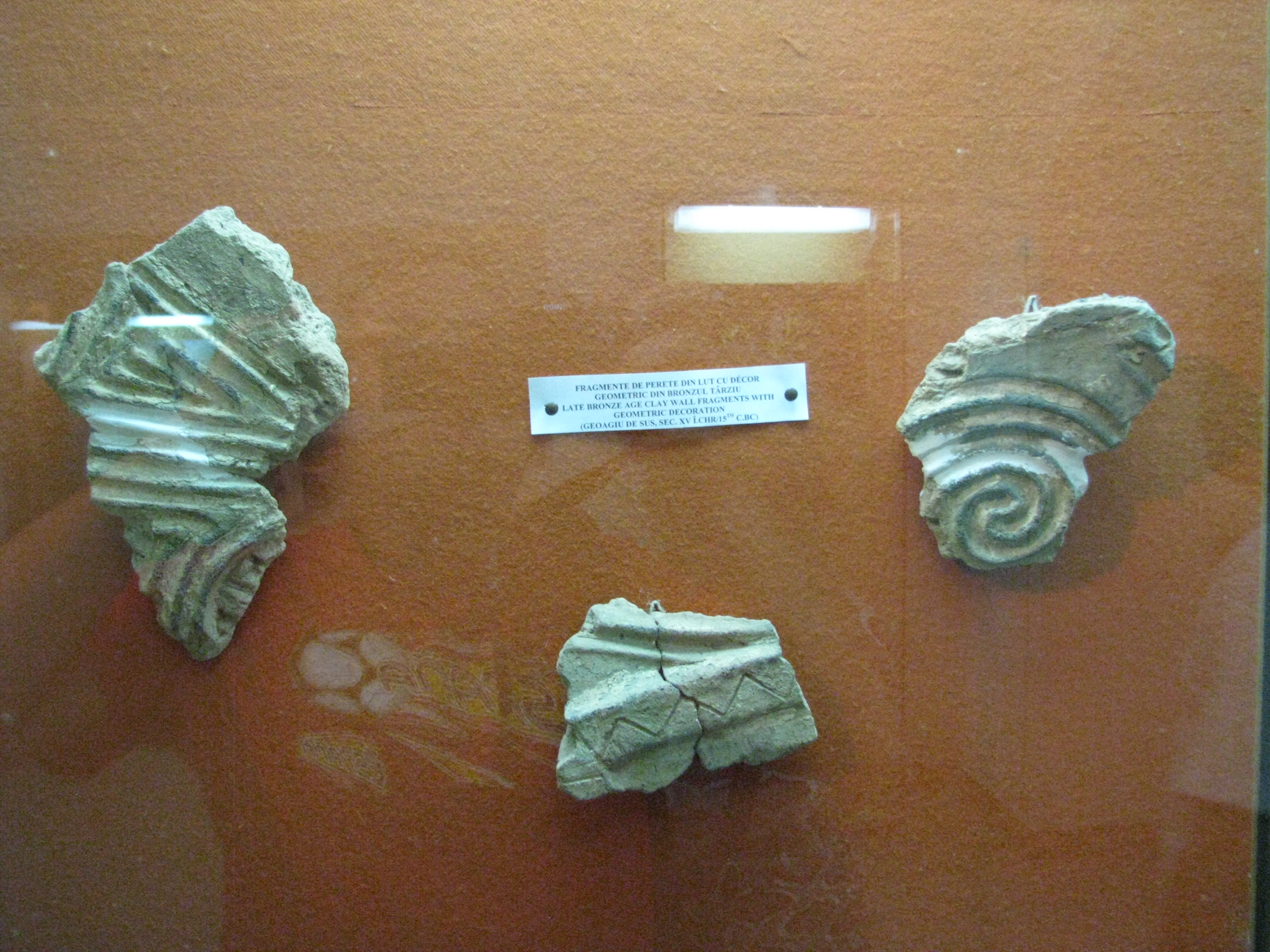
Fragments of wall decorations from Geoagiu de Sus in the Apuseni Mountains (National Museum of the Union, Alba Iulia)

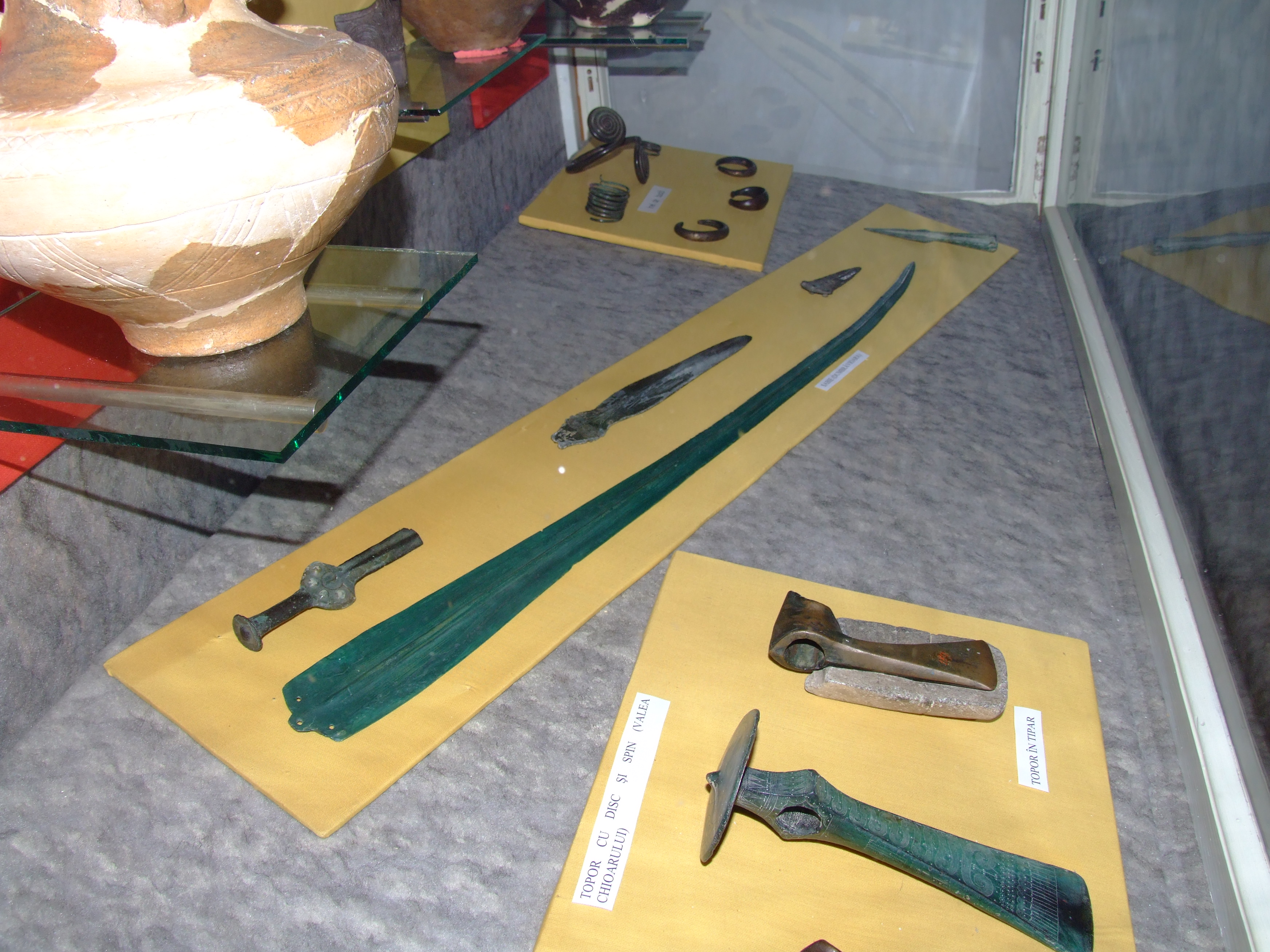
Mycenaean sword found at Dumbrăvioara and Wietenberg axes, one found at Valea Chioarului and one shown in its mold (National Museum of Transylvanian History in Cluj)

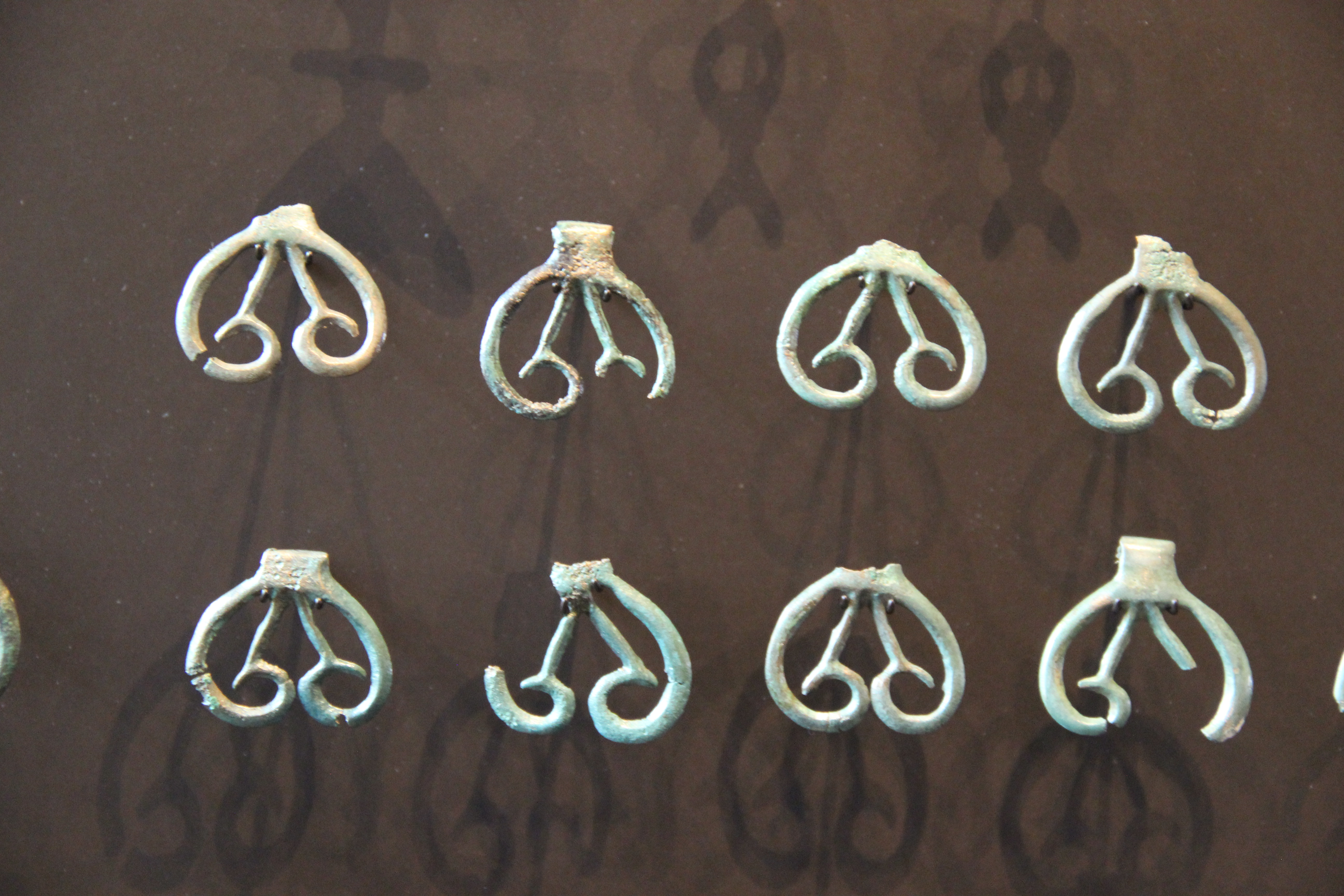
Bronze ornaments

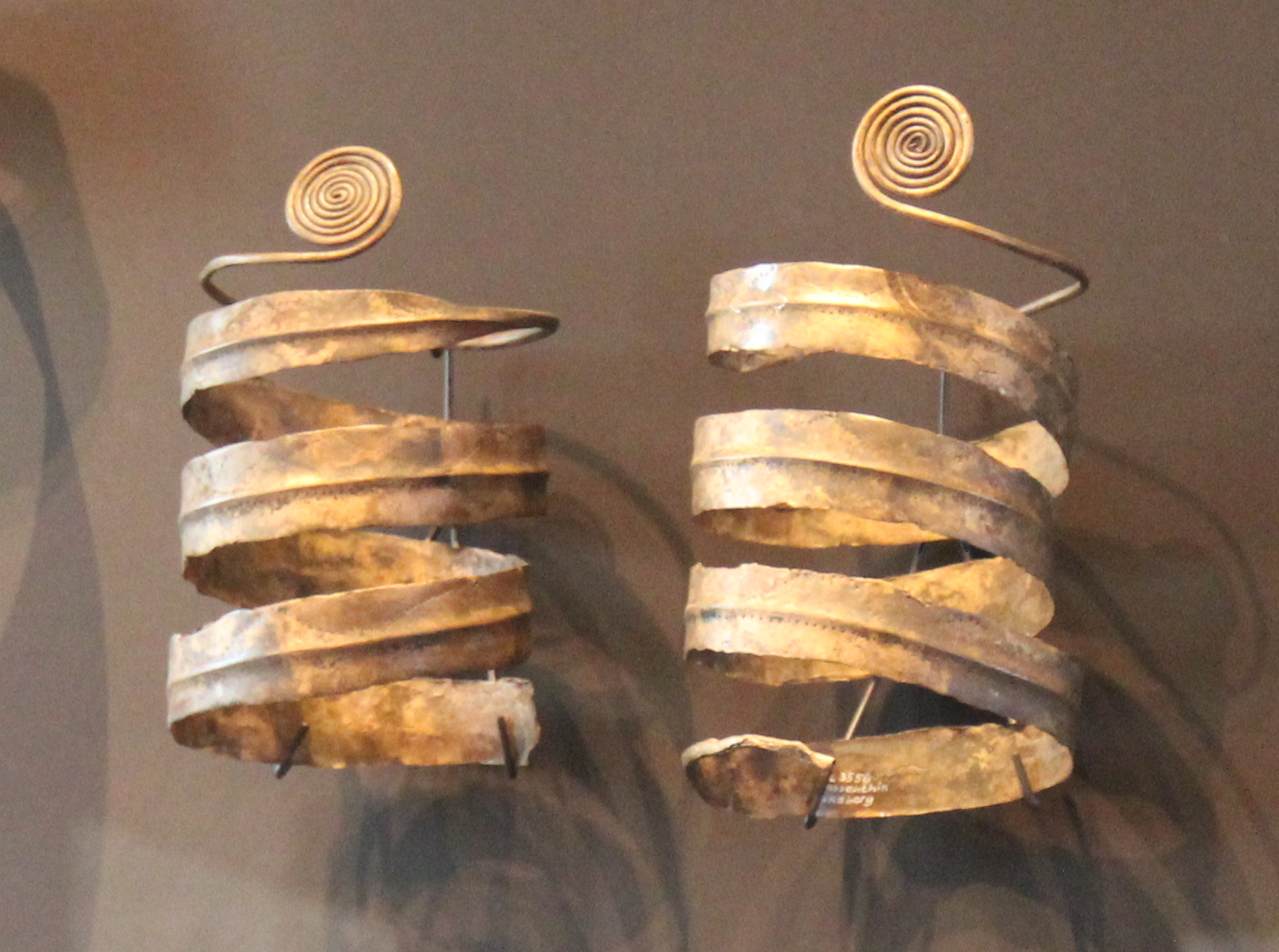
Bronze legbands

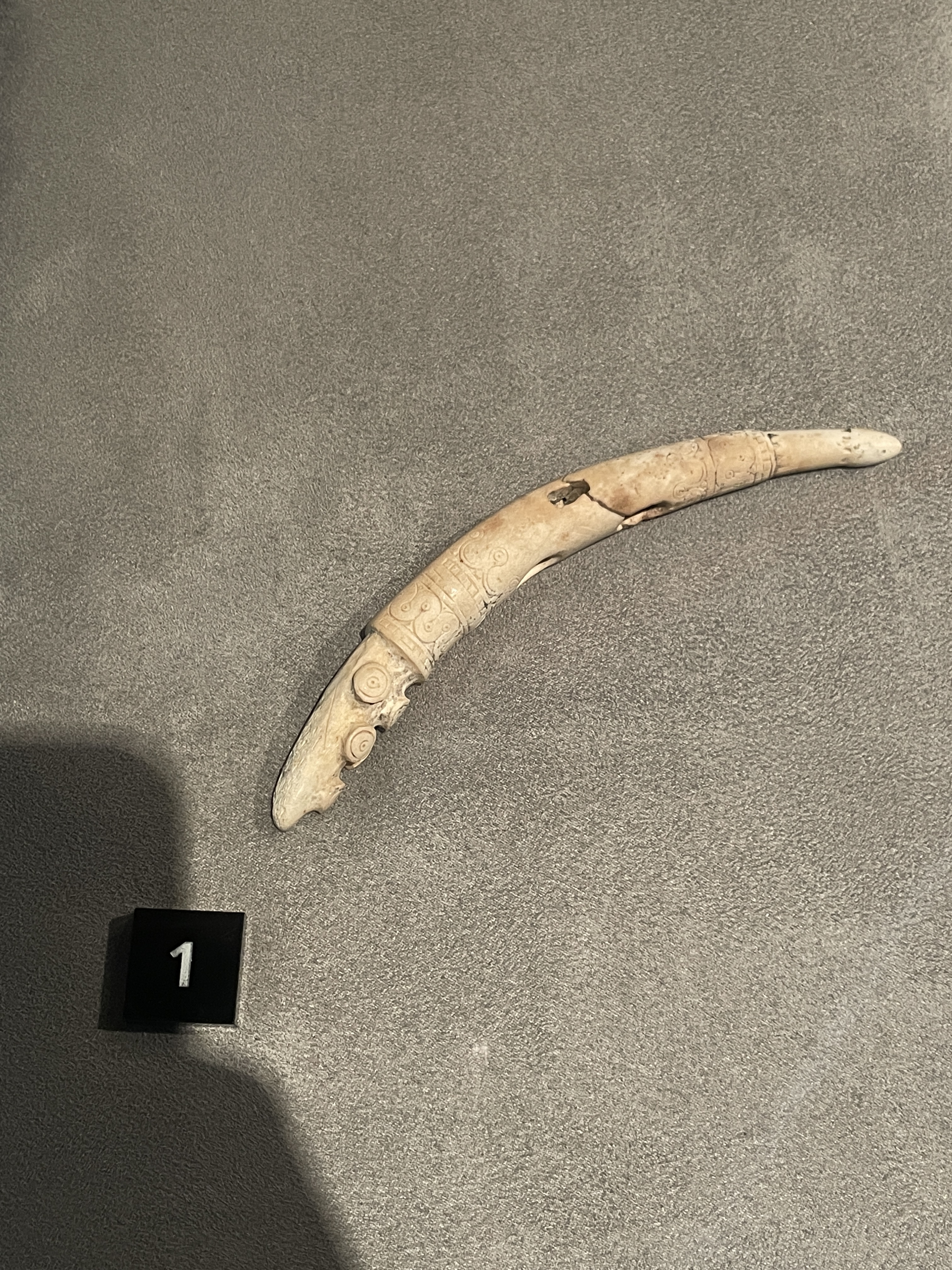
Horse bridle piece made from antler

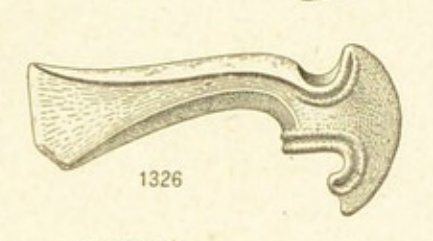
Golden axe of Tufalau, c. 1650 BC

Bronze axe heads

== See also ==
- Bronze Age in Romania
- Maros culture
- Ottomány culture
- Monteoru culture
- Tei culture
- Vatya culture
- Basarabi culture
- Coțofeni culture
- Pecica culture
- Prehistory of Transylvania
- Prehistoric Romania
- Prehistoric Europe
- Bronze Age Europe
- Rotbav Archaeological Site
