= Prehistory of Transylvania =

Early Transylvania

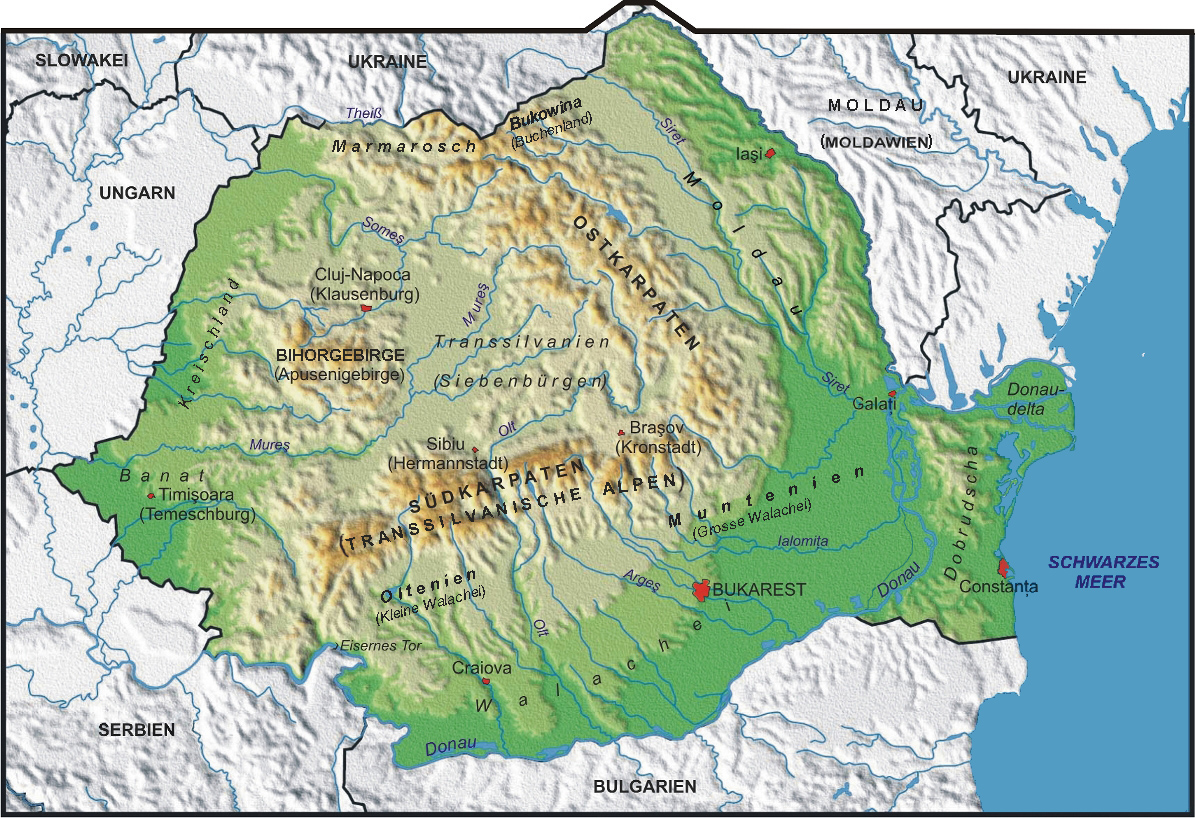
Transylvania is a plateau in northwest central Romania, bounded by the Carpathian Mountains to the east and south and the Apuseni Mountains towards the west.

The Prehistory of Transylvania describes what can be learned about the region known as Transylvania through archaeology, anthropology, comparative linguistics and other allied sciences.

Transylvania proper is a plateau or tableland in northwest central Romania. It is bounded and defined by the Carpathian Mountains to the east and south, and the Apuseni Mountains to the west. As a diverse and relatively protected region, the area has always been rich in wildlife, and remains one of the more ecologically diverse areas in Europe. The mountains contain a large number of caves, which attracted both human and animal residents. The Peștera Urșilor, the "Bears Cave", was home to a large number of cave bears (Ursus spelæus) whose remains were discovered when the cave was discovered in 1975. Other caves in the area sheltered early humans.

Prehistory is the longest period in the history of mankind, throughout of which writing was still unknown. In Transylvania specifically this applies to the Paleolithic, Neolithic, Bronze Age, and Iron Age.

== Paleolithic ==
(2,600,000 – 13,000 BP)

The Paleolithic epoch, the oldest and longest period in the history of mankind, is divided by specialists into three stages of development: Lower Paleolithic, Middle Paleolithic, and Upper Paleolithic. The chronological frame of the Paleolithic coincides with that of the Pleistocene (the first period of the Quaternary), and is marked by four great glaciations, as established in the Alps (Günz, Mindel, Riss, and Würm).

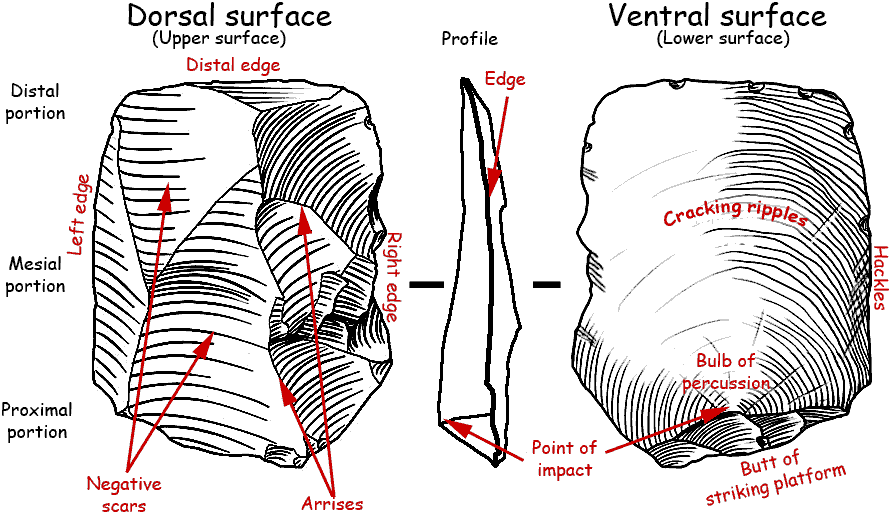
Fundamental elements for the technic description of a lithic flake.

While an ever-increasing amount of data has become available on the evolution of the climate, fauna and vegetation of present-day Romania, there is very little in the fossil record to give researchers an idea of what Paleolithic man in Romania looked like. To date, no human skeletal remains dating from the Low Paleolithic have been found, while the only Middle Paleolithic remains that have been discovered were a number of phalanges unearthed by Márton Roska in the Bordu Mare Cave at Ohaba Ponor, Hunedoara County. A skull capsule discovered by Roska in the Cioclovina Cave displays features attributed to Homo sapiens sapiens, and dates back to the Upper Paleolithic as indicated by three flint objects peculiar to the Aurignacian discovered next to them. Likewise, in the Ciurul Mare Cave in the Pădurea Craiului Mountains (Transylvania) speleologists have discovered some distinctively male, female and child footprints. An anthropological analysis has identified Cro-Magnon and even Neanderthal characteristics in these footprints.

The economy of the Paleolithic communities consisted mainly of exploiting natural resources: gathering, fishing and especially hunting were the main pursuits of the diverse human groups. As early as the Lower Paleolithic, human groups either hunted or trapped game. We can assume that in Transylvania, alongside mammoths or deer, horses were a fairly important food source, if our dating of the painting on the ceiling of the cave at Cuciulat, Sălaj County, is correct.

The Lower Paleolithic in Transylvania, because data are scarce, is largely a mystery. If the discovery of an Acheulean lithic item at Căpușu Mic, Cluj County, and of several Pre-Mousterian lithic items at Tălmaciu, Sibiu County, are a certain fact, their precise stratigraphic position remains to be established. The same cannot be said about the discoveries in the Ciuc Depression at Sândominic, Harghita County, where several tools, and a rich fauna, have been encountered in certified stratigraphic positions, belonging to the geo-chronological interval covering the late Mindel to the early Riss.

The Middle Paleolithic – Mousterian – covers a time period much shorter than that of the prior epoch (c. 100,000 – 33,000/30,000 BP). It is a period set largely in Early Upper Pleistocene, and corresponds within the alpine glacial chronology to the interval covering the late Riss-Würm interglacial, or rather the Lower Würm, through middle Würm, as indicated by the dating of the late Mousterian dwellings in the Gura Cheii Cave, Râșnov, Brașov County, and the Spurcată Cave, Nandru, Hunedoara County.

The Mousterian period is closest to the alpine Paleolithic. Both periods were characterized by the presence of numerous quartzite slivers and chips, with the bones of hunted game outnumbering the tools. Consequently, specialists consider this Mousterian to be an "Eastern Charentian".

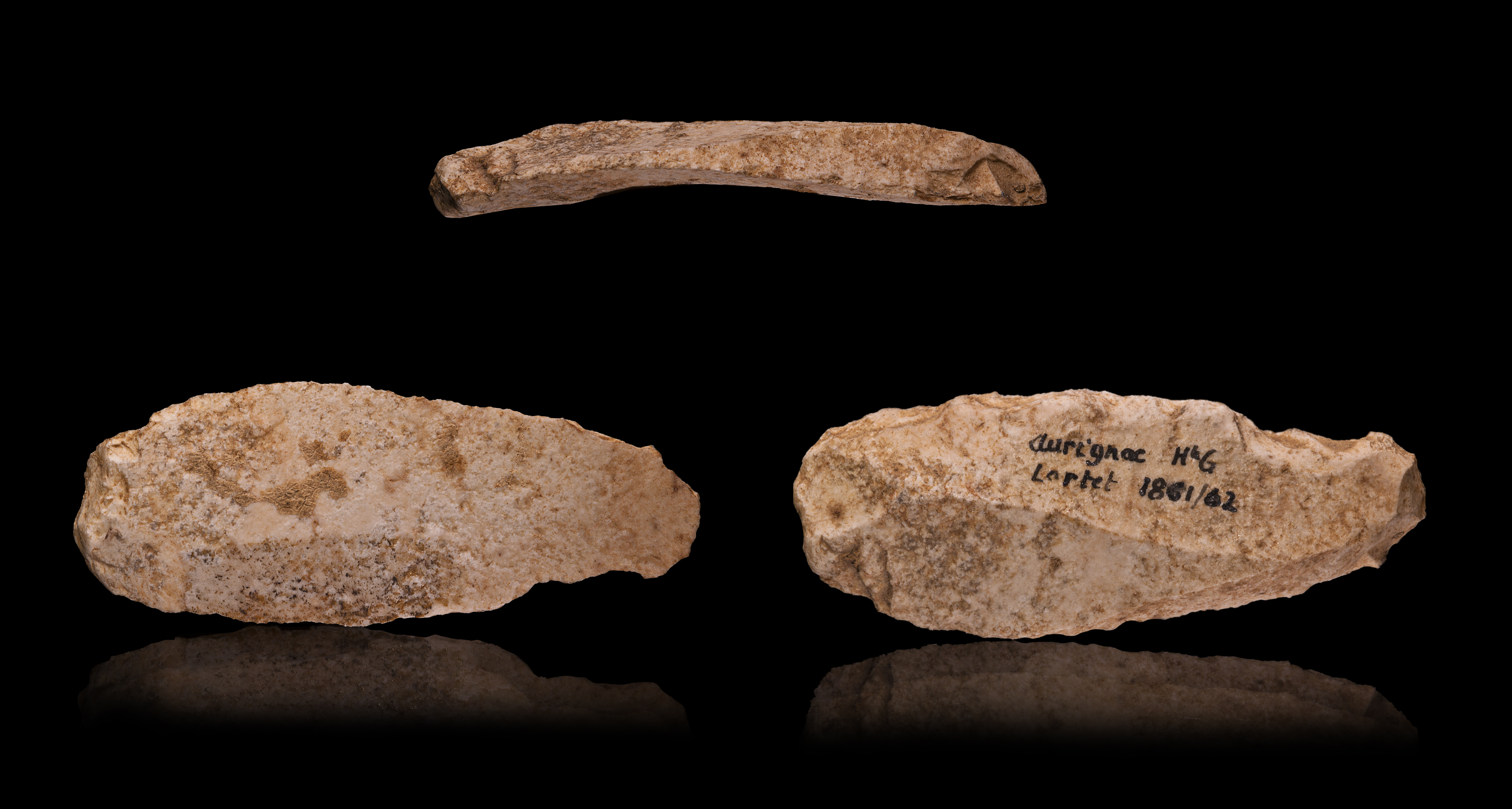
Aurignacian double edged scraper on blade – 3 views of the same object.

Likewise, North-Western and Northern Transylvania with the settlements at Boinești, Satu Mare County, and Remetea, Maramureș County, have revealed several typically Mousterian tools (flake scrapers, blade scrapers, target points etc.), some of which have been associated with a later stage of the Mousterian, or even with a transition stage to the Upper Paleolithic, at the onset of the Aurignacian culture of the Upper Paleolithic.

The process of regional diversification among cultures was accelerated in the Upper Paleolithic through the middle to upper Würm. The beginnings of the Upper Paleolithic on the territory of Romania is dated somewhere between 32,000/30,000 – 13,000 BP, corresponding paleoclimatically to the onset of the Arcy oscillation, and is marked by the development of the two great civilizations: the Aurignacian and the Gravettian both featuring several stages of development as established by stratigraphy.

The onset of the Aurignacian culture seems to have paralleled the late Mousterian facies in the Carpathian caves, if we accept as valid the C14 dating of level IIb in the cave of Gura Cheii in Râșnov. Northwestern Transylvania is the site where layers of the Middle Aurignacian culture have been identified, as signaled by the presence of blade scrapers, refitted core, burins. In Banat, the settlements of Tincova, Coșava, and Românești-Dumbrăvița, have produced flint tools demonstrating that the Aurignacian in this area evolved closely with that in Central Europe (the Krems-Dufour group). Aurignician items were also found in the caves in the Western Carpathians, the most famous of which is the Cioclovina cave in Hunedoara County – the site, around the start of the 20th century, of the first Paleolithic discoveries in Transylvania.

The Eastern Gravettian had a long evolution, featuring several stages of development as documented especially by the settlements in Moldova. The Gravettian has left traces in Țara Oașului and Maramureș, the sites of microlite fashioned mainly out of obsidian indicating the connection with the Gravettian in the neighboring regions (Moldavia, South-Carpathian Ukraine, Eastern Slovakia, and Northeastern Hungary).

The Late Gravettian covers Banat too, particularly the area of the Iron Gates of the Danube, where heads identical to the Laugerie-Basse type heads were discovered in grottoes and open air dwellings. Still in Banat, a culture with several stages of development was identified and subsequently named the Quartzite Upper Paleolithic by its discoverer, considered to be synchronous with the local Aurignacian, later the Gravettian, and regarded as a prolongation of the late stages of the Mousterian with quartz and quartzite tools (Eastern Charentian).

== Epipaleolithic and Mesolithic ==
(13,000 – 9,500 BP)

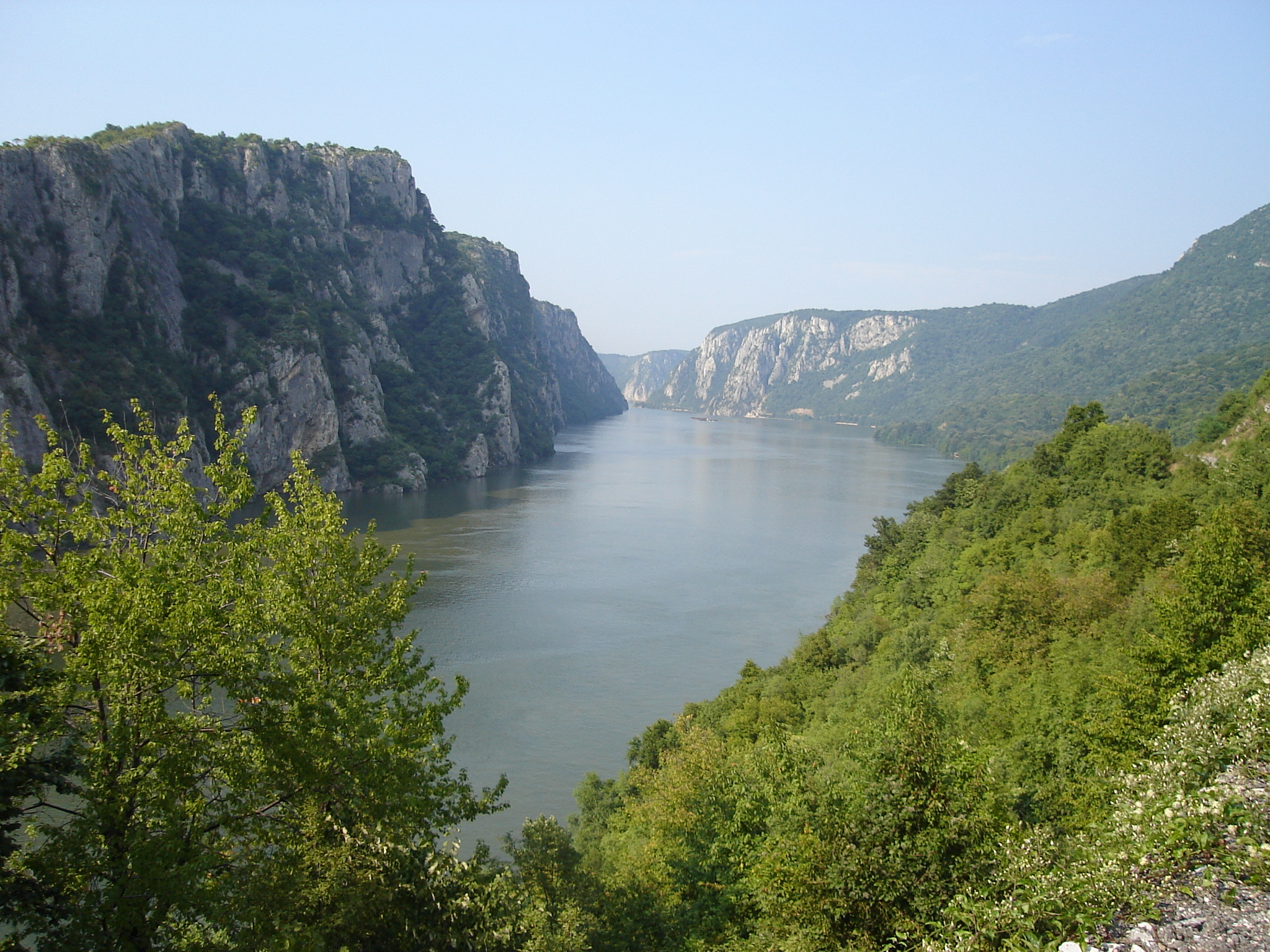
The Iron Gates of the Danube

The populations evolving at the onset of the Bölling oscillation (approximately 12,000 BP) and which have continued to the end of the Preboreal have been generally attributed to the Epipaleolithic. Consequently, this historical period could be associated with the interval between 13,000 and about 9,500-9,000 BP. These communities continued the lifestyles of the Upper Paleolithic. Due to numerous factors, including changes in the climate, the small groups of hunters-fishermen-gatherers innovated tool and weapon types – producing, for instance, microlites (trapeze) — while also keeping the traditional tool types.

The Iron Gates mesolithic culture of the central trans-Danube region, named by archaeologists after the gorge of Porţile de Fier ("Iron Gates"), was settled by a population attributed to the Late Epigravettian or Mediterranean Tardigravettian. The first stage of this period was discovered by archaeologists in the Climente II cave (Mehedinți County), and the second stage, by discoveries in the shelter under the rocks at Cuina Turcului, Dubova, both of which are located in the same limestone massif — Ciucaru Mare. The two dwelling levels at Cuina Turcului have produced a large quantity of tools and weapons made of flint in particular, and less so of obsidian, bone and horn, as well as body ornaments (shells and drilled teeth, bone pendants, etc.) The ornaments are often decorated with incised geometrical patterns. The most remarkable is a drilled horse phalange, wholly ornamented and probably representing a female figure.

Besides the mammal (beaver, boar, mountain goat, etc.), bird and fish remnants, fragments of human skeletons were also found. The Climente II cave has produced a human skeleton, set in a crouching position, and covered by a thick layer of red ochre, which is attributed to the Tardigravettian dwelling and which predates Level I at Cuina Turcului.

The discoveries in the Clisura area display striking similarities to the industries of the Italian Peninsula — the expression of the migrant human bearers of the Late Epigravettian in the mentioned area.

== Mesolithic ==
(9,500 – 7,500 BP)

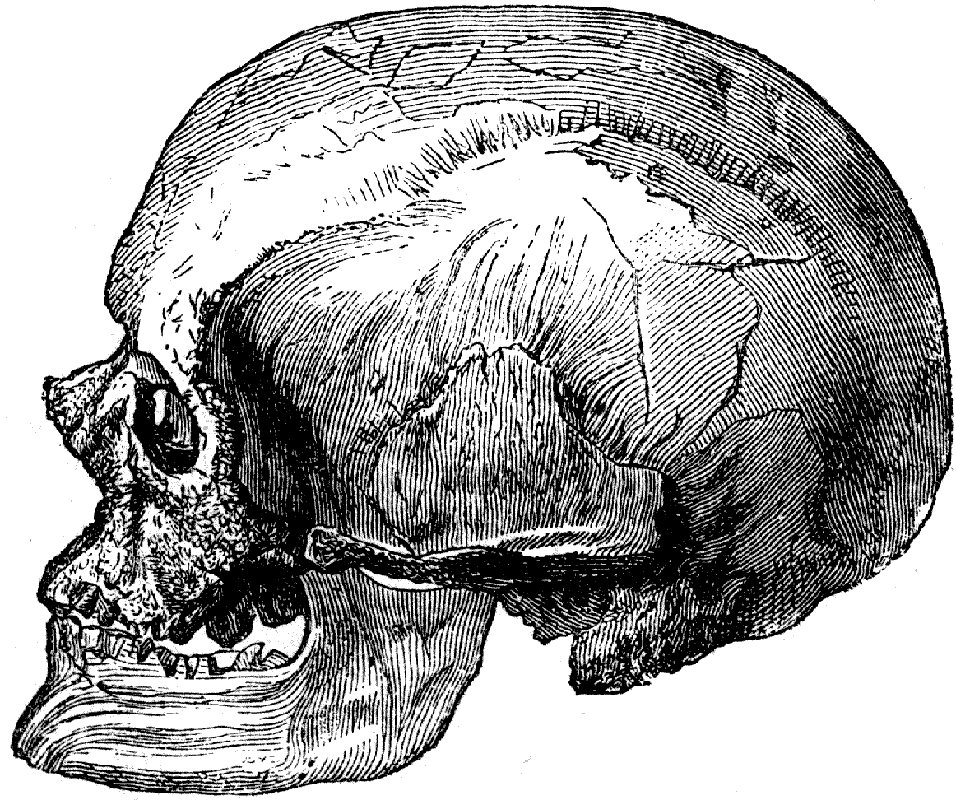
Male Cro-Magnon skull

Specialist opinions fix the beginning of the Mesolithic era at the end of the Preboreal, its development throughout the Boreal, and its end as late as the beginnings of the Atlantic. Chronologically then, it can be set between 9,500-9,000 and 7,500 BP. Two cultures are documented on the territory of Romania in this time period: the Tardenoisian and the Schela Cladova types.

The Tardenoisian spread in several of the country's regions (Moldavia, Muntenia, Dobruja), including the mountainous area of Transylvania in the southeast (Cremenea-Sita Buzăului, Costanța-Lădăuți) and northwest (Ciumești-Pășune). In the settlement of Ciumești, Satu Mare County, besides the typically Central and East European Tardenoisian microlitice tools made of flint and obsidian, some artefacts were found in the form of circular segments and two triangular ones, in addition to trapezes. The fauna remnants indicate the presence of wild boar and deer.

Some specialists do not exclude the possibility of identifying the Late Tardenoisian communities of the north-western Pontic or central European types (of which the settlement at Ciumești is one) as being in the process of neolithization, albeit incomplete, that is, displaying an incipient productive economy, whose foundations were laid by animal domestication and plant cultures.

The Schela Cladovei culture is known through the nine open air settlements in the proximity of the Danube. The lithic utensils come in numerous atypical forms and are fashioned of quartzite and siliceous sandstone while an additional small number are made of flint. The horn tools (agriculture artefacts with one or two handle attachment holes) apparently indicate the debut of plant cultivation. Some of the larger river rocks flattened by water or some of the thicker slabs might have served for grinding. The examination of the fauna indicates an economy based mainly on hunting. The targeted game were deer, roebucks, European bisons, wild boars, hares, wild donkeys, foxes, etc. Furthermore, it would seem that the representatives of this culture domesticated the dog.

Anthropological data are quite consistent. The physical type was evaluated as Oriental Cro-Magnon. The skeletons of the deceased were laid in rectangular holes, some dug in the floor of the dwelling itself. Part of them was laid in a crouching position, part was laid on their back, together with some of their personal belongings. Child mortality was high, while the average life expectancy for adults was 36.2 years. The discovery of some skeletons with arrowhead marks speaks of violent death. Research so far has proved that this culture does not have its roots in the Mediterranean type Tardigravettian, but rather originated by some new migration into the Iron Gates region. In addition, it would seem that on the arrival of the first bearers of the Neolithic civilisation (Precriș culture), the Schela Cladovei culture had already come to an end.

== Neolithic ==
(6600 – 3500 BC)

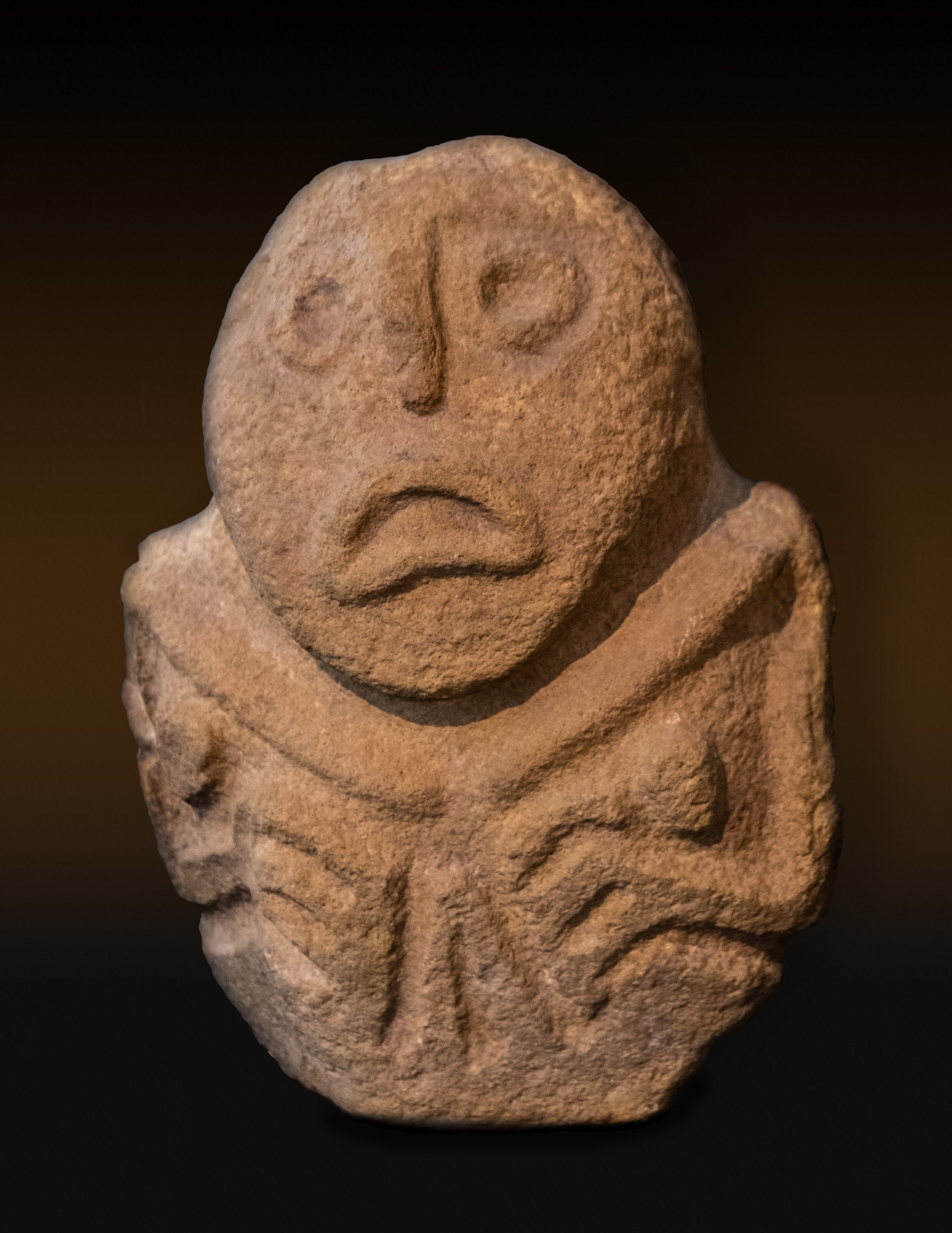
Sculpture found at the archaeological site of Lepenski Vir

The Neolithic began with the slow migration of communities from the south of the Balkan Peninsula (the Protosesklo culture from the Thesalo-Macedonean area), who brought with them momentous economic progress. Consequently, the process of neolithisation, which is essentially a shift to plant growing and animal breeding, was not an innovation of the local Mesolithic population but rather the result of the penetration of this territory by communities carrying the Neolithic civilization.

The normal divisions of the Neolithic are: Early Neolithic, Developed Neolithic, and Chalcolithic (Copper Age). The Neolithic epoch on the territory of Romania, as certified by calibrated 14C dates, began around 6600 BC, and ended around 3800–3700 BC, and no later than 3500 BC.

The Early Neolithic (c. 6600–5500 BC) consists of two cultural layers: genetically linked and with similar physiognomies. The first (layer Gura Baciului – Cârcea/Precriș) is the exclusive result of the migration of a Neolithic population from the South Balkan area, while the second (the Starčevo-Criș culture) reflects the process of adjusting to local conditions by a South Balkan community, possibly a synthesis with the local Tardenoisian groups.

The layer Gura Baciului – Cârcea, also called the Precriș culture, is a spin-off of a Protosesklo culture group that advanced north and reached the North Danubian region where it founded the first culture of painted pottery in Romania. The small number of sites attributable to this early cultural time has not allowed the route followed by the group, to penetrate the Inter-Carpathian area, to be firmly established, yet in all likelihood, it was the Olt Valley.

Based on the stratigraphy in the site of Gura Baciului, Cluj County, and Ocna Sibiului, Sibiu County, the development of the culture is divided into three major stages. The settlements are situated on high terraces strung along secondary valleys. The dwellings are most often underground, but there are also ground level houses, usually standing on river stone platforms. Pottery (bowls, cups) is refined, with white painted dots or geometrical patterns on red or brown-red background. Concomitant with pottery, plant cultures and animal breeding, the new culture introduces implements of polished stone and the first clay statuettes. The dead are buried on the grounds of the settlements sometimes directly under the dwellings. Gura Baciului is the first site on the territory of Romania attesting incineration as a funerary practice.

Anthropomorphic and zoomorphic plastic art reveals a bipolar system of beliefs: the Great Mother, representing the female principle, and the Bull, representing the male principle. The presence among the findings at Gura Baciului of some anthropomorphic stone heads, similar to the famous stone heads of Lepenski Vir, signify possible contact between the locals, the Mesolithic cultures, and the newcomers. Furthermore, the adoption of these alien deities, even if exclusively a plastic substantiation, speaks of a remarkable process of assimilation, characteristic of the layer above mentioned.

At Ocna Sibiului, at Precriș, level II, a small conical stone statuette was found, with a shape representing a couple embracing, and a plinth of the same material associated with the figure. On the statue and the plinth several symbols can be distinguished interpreted by the discoverer as ideograms.

=== Starčevo-Criș culture ===
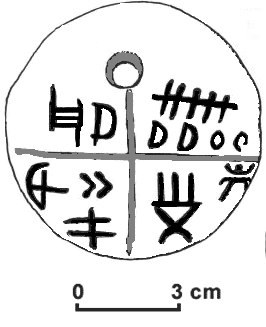
Neolithic clay amulet (retouched), part of the Tărtăria tablets set, dated to 5500–5300 BC and associated with the Turdaș-Vinča culture. The Vinča symbols on it predate the proto-Sumerian pictographic script. Discovered in 1961 at Tărtăria, Alba County, Romania by the archaeologist Nicolae Vlassa.

The Starčevo-Criș culture, representing the generalisation of the early Neolithic in the Intra-Carpathian territory, has been regarded by some as the prolongation of the Gura Baciului-Cârcea/Precriș culture, disregarding that it is probably the result of a new south Balkan migration (the Presesklo culture) arriving in Transylvania via Banat. The Starčevo–Criș culture has a long evolution in four stages.

Dwellings were set up on meadows, terraces, hills and even in caves, wherever the environment was friendly. The dwellings were embedded in the early phases and were huts at ground level, in the later phases. Asymmetrical receptacles, bowls, spherical cups, all of which were made of clay, furnish the interiors of this culture. The lithic utensil inventory includes flint and obsidian microlites, as well as large polished stone axes of the Walzenbiele type. It is now, too, that the first small copper items occur sporadically. The pintaderas decorated with geometrical patterns as well as the Spondylus and Tridacna shells testify to possible connections with Eastern Mediterranean regions. Burials were performed both inside and among the dwellings. Anthropological analyses have revealed a major Mediterranean component suggesting a southern origin of this population.

The Developed Neolithic (c. 5500–4000 BC) covers the interval between the last phase of the Starčevo–Criș culture and the beginnings of the Petrești culture, the period including what has long been known as middle and late Neolithic. The Developed Neolithic is marked by the migration of some new groups of populations, whose point of departure was the south of the Balkan Peninsula, as part of the group of cultures with polished black pottery. These same groups created the Vinča culture (more commonly divided into four main phases: A, B, C, and D), whose beginning is synchronous with the final phase of the Sesklo culture (Greece) occupying Banat and most of Transylvania. In about the same period, the north-east of Transylvania was penetrated by several groups, bearing the linear and musical note pottery culture.

The Vinča culture in Romania comes in many forms depending on the local background against which it developed (the Starčevo-Criș culture and the linear pottery) and the degree of southern influence. The synthesis of the above-mentioned elements gave birth to numerous related regional elements, so that when referring to the Transylvania territory, specialists do not speak of a Vinča culture per se, but rather that of the Banat culture, the Bucovăț group, the Pișcolt group, the Turdaș culture, the Cluj-Cheile–Turzii–Lumea Nouă–Iclod complex, and the Iclod group. A general characteristic of these groups is the black polished pottery (cups, bowls, lids, etc.). The decorations are variously incised and impressed (bands filled in with stripes, in particular) in addition to displaying fine grooves. The statuettes feature oblong heads (possibly indicating a mask), cross-like bodies, and are often decorated with spiral winding patterns.

In Banat, with the end of the Vinča A2 stage there emerges the Banat culture with several distinctive regional peculiarities (groups Bucovăț and Parța). The Parța settlement, thoroughly researched, demonstrates that the culture reached a high level of civilization, attested to by the one storey buildings and by a complex spiritual life, partly decoded by the components of the great sanctuary studied here. The cult edifice (with maximum dimensions of 12x6x7m), with two stages of construction, had two chambers, the one to the east, the other to the west, separated by an altar table and then a wall. The west chamber served as a depository for daily offerings. In the foundation of the south entrance to this chamber was laid a zoomorphic idol and a tiny vessel. The east chamber served for the initiation ceremonies. Religious centers of this type through their prestige and grandeur most certainly congregated the population of an extended area.

The charred seeds found in the Liubcova settlement indicate that several cereals were grown. Wheat prevailed, particularly the Triticum dicoccum species, as well as the Triticum monococcum and Triticum aestivus species in proportion of approx. 10%. The first occurrence on the territory of Romania of the Hordeum vulgare barley is seen. Also present are such leguminous plants as lentil and vetch. Of paramount interest is that wheat was harvested, as discovered in a settlement south of the Carpathians (Teiu, the Gumelnița culture), and was possibly used in other areas, too. The wheat was harvested by pulling out, then was sheaved and tied with a switch, vine shoots or ivy. Once carried to the settlement, the grain was threshed.

=== Turdaș culture ===
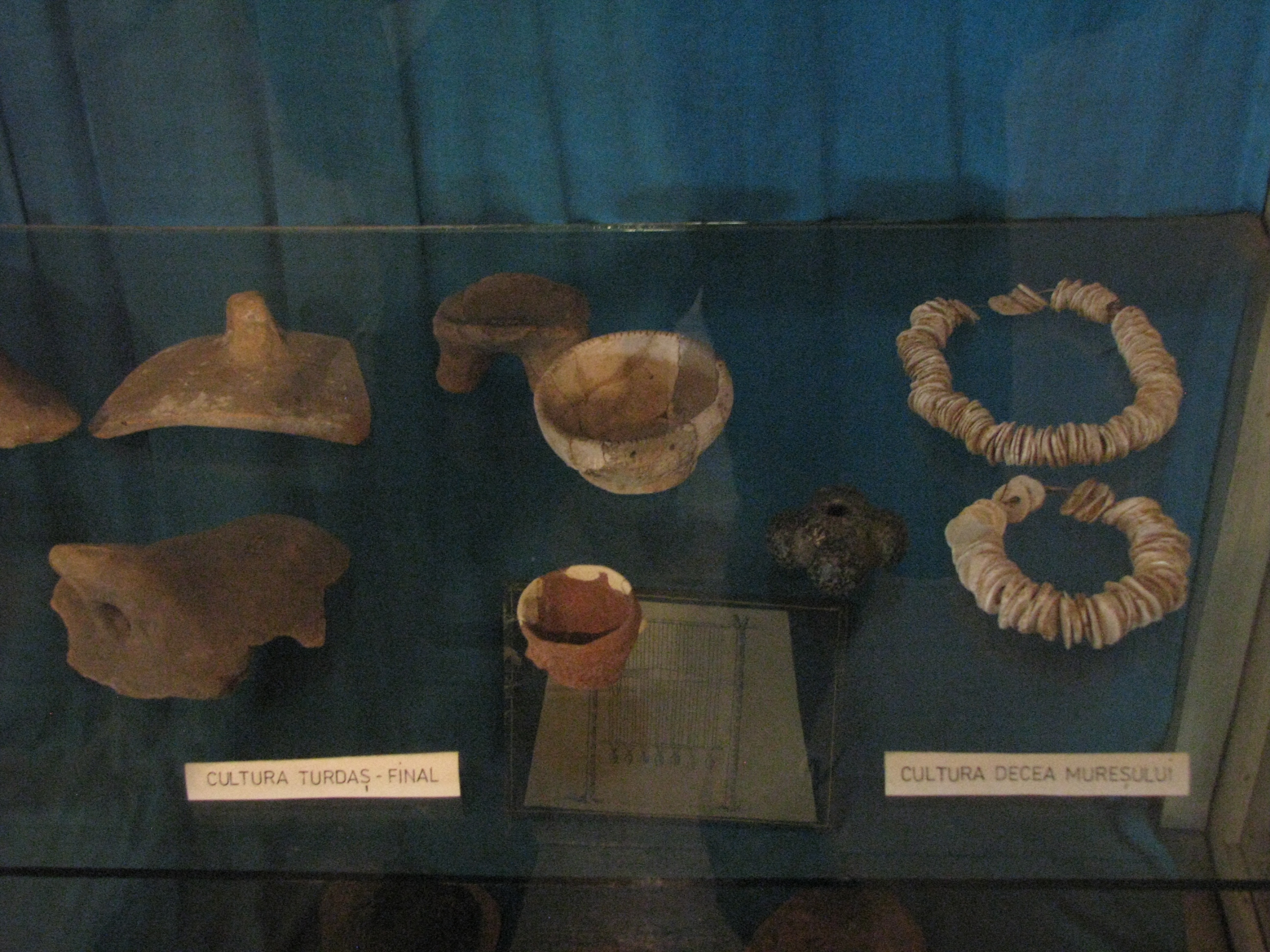
Turdaș culture and Decea Mureșului culture artifacts at the Aiud History Museum, Aiud

The Vinča communities that advanced on the middle course of the Mureș River, under the influence of the Starčevo-Criș traditions and the elements of the linear pottery, created a new cultural synthesis called the Turdaș culture. The occurrence of signs incised on the bottom of several vessels, particularly on those at Turdaș (Hunedoara County), have often been regarded as the potter's mark. More recently they have been considered by some researchers as early attempts at recording dates graphically. That things might stand this way is demonstrated, apparently, by the baked clay tablets covered with incised pictographic patterns at Tărtăria (Alba County), discovered, according to Nicolae Vlassa, in a ritual hole in the ground, next to clay and alabaster idols and a fragment of an anchor, all of which have triggered hot debate over the stratigraphy and chronology of the settlement.

The preservation by some Starčevo-Criș communities of painted pottery, in addition to the Vinča elements, engendered in the area of the eastern arch of the Western Carpathians the Cluj–Cheile Turzii–Lumea Nouă–Iclod cultural complex. This complex represents the substratum for the emergence of the Petrești culture. Long-term research at Iclod has demonstrated that this station possessed a complex fortification system built during the Iclod, Phase I, still in use for some time in the Iclod II phase, eventually abandoned when the settlement expanded. It is in the same spot that research has been carried in two inhumation necropoles, where the dead were laid on their backs hands across their chests or abdomens or along their bodies; the bodies were oriented east–west, their heads facing east. The inventory consists of vessels (cylindrical, painted bowls, and S profile pots), ochre, stone utensils, ornaments and animal offerings.

=== Chalcolithic ===
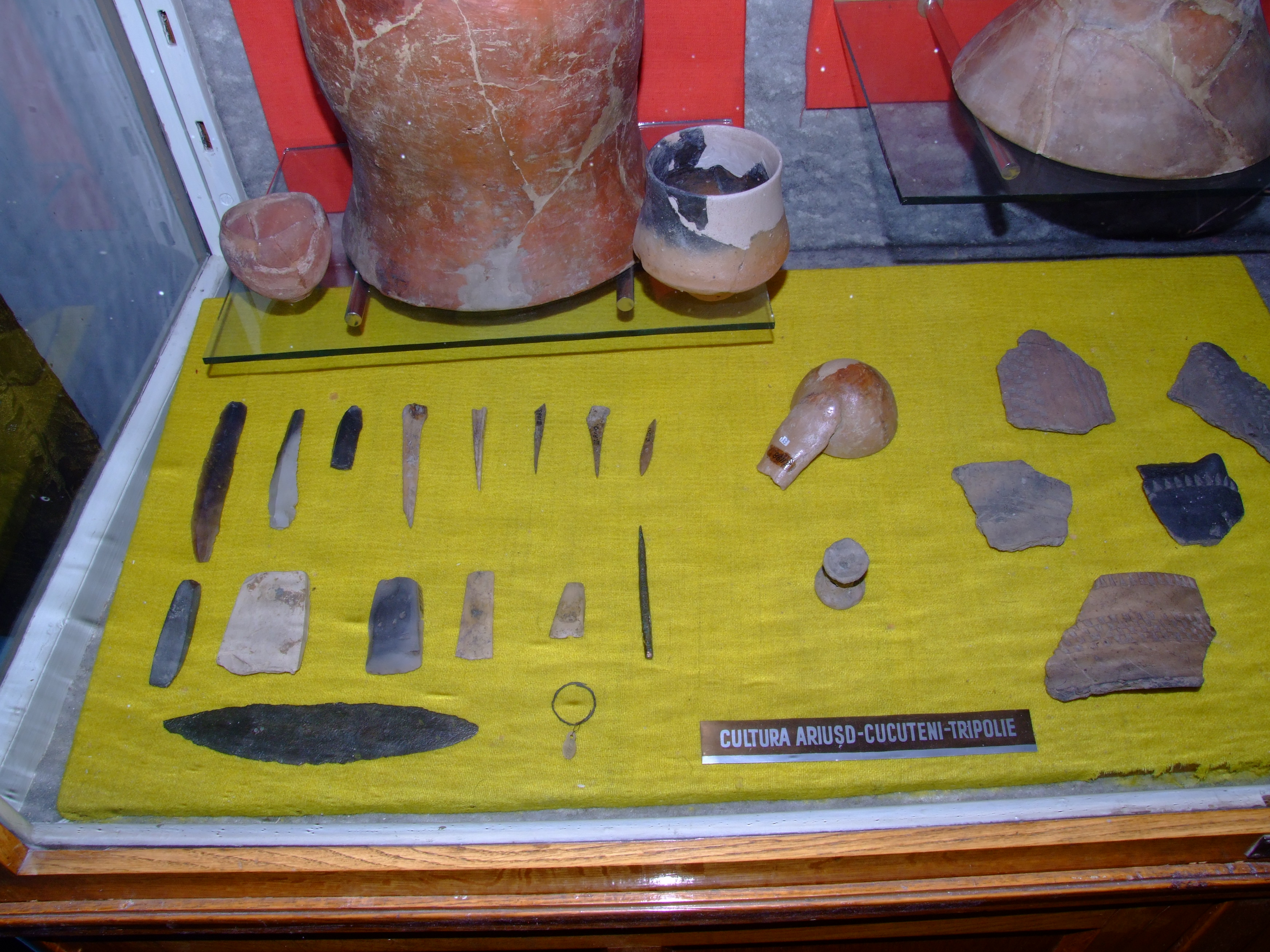
Artefacts of the Cucuteni-Ariuşd-Tripolie culture. On display at the National Museum of Transylvanian History, Cluj-Napoca

The Chalcolithic, Eneolithic or Copper Age (c. 4600/4500 – 3800/3700 BC) is characterized by an ever-increasing number of copper items, as well as the presence of stone, bone, horn and baked clay utensils. It marks the first production of heavy copper tools and moulds, (axes – chisels and axes), in close conjunction with the exploitation of copper deposits in Transylvania. Gold is used for ornaments and the fashioning of such idols as those at Moigrad in the Bodrogkeresztúr-Gornești culture. The craft of pottery reaches a peak, exemplified by the great number of exquisitely decorated pots.

Cultures typical for this period are the Cucuteni-Ariușd, Petrești, Tiszapolgár-Românești and Bodrogkeresztúr-Gornești. The first two cultures are among the numerous Eneolithic cultures with pottery painted in bi- and tri-chromatic patterns.

At Ariușd, Covasna County, in the east of Transylvania, the first systematic excavations were undertaken in what is considered the neo-Eneolithic epoch in Romania. The material discovered has been integrated into the greater painted pottery complex of Cucuteni-Ariușd-Trypillia.

==== Petrești culture ====
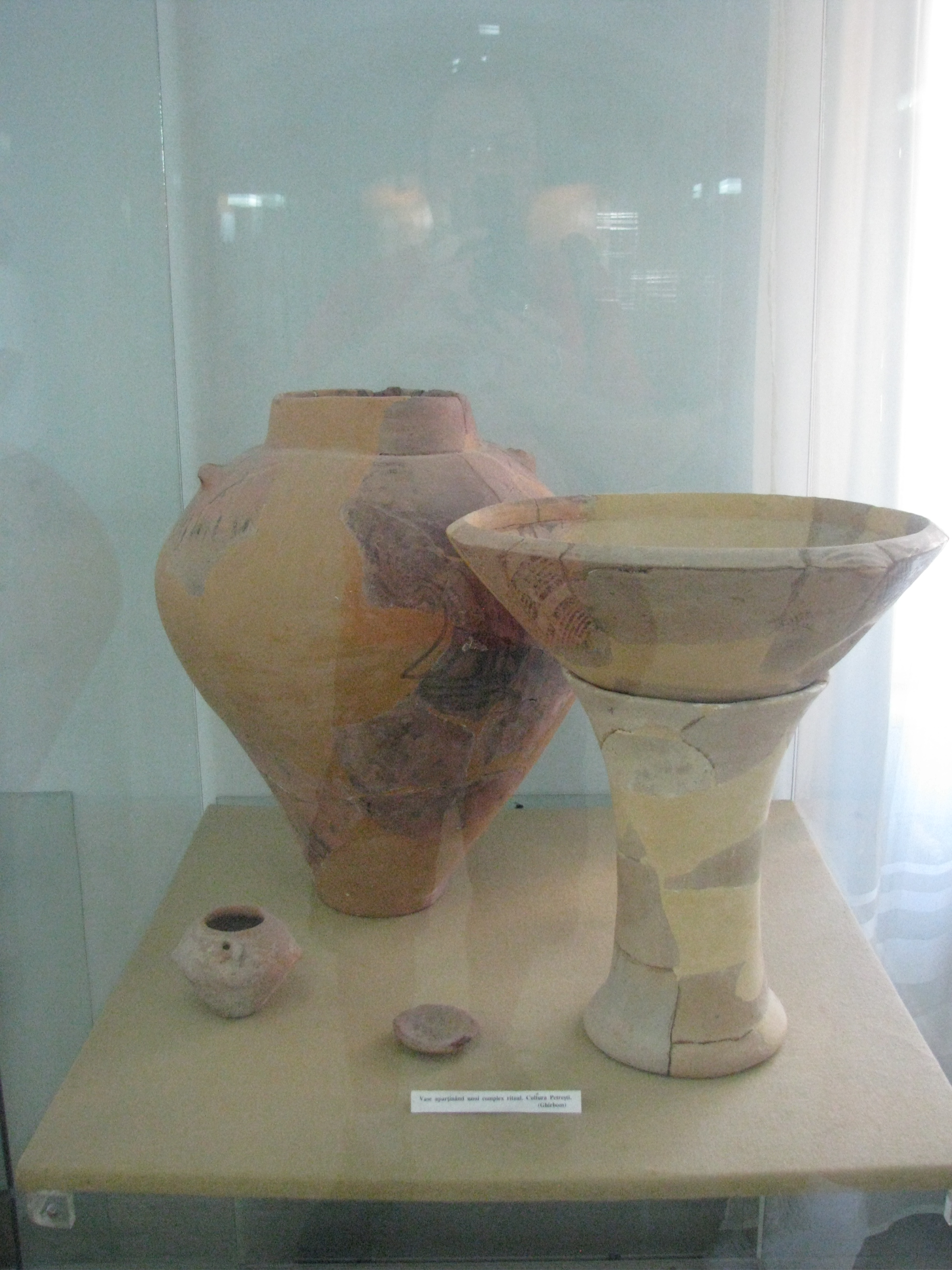
Petrești culture pottery belonging to a ritual complex from Ghirbom, Alba. On display at the National Museum of the Union, Alba Iulia

The Petrești culture diffused across almost all of Transylvania, is regarded as local in origin by some specialists, and as a migration originating from the southern areas of the Balkans, by others. It is primarily known for its painted decoration – patterns painted in red, brown-red, later brown, on a brick-red background, which testifies to the high standard of civilization of the bearers of this culture. The ornamental motifs consist in bands, rhombuses, squares, spirals, and windings. The typical forms are bowls, tureens, high stands. Plastic art is fairly scarce and so are brass items.

==== Decea Mureșului culture ====
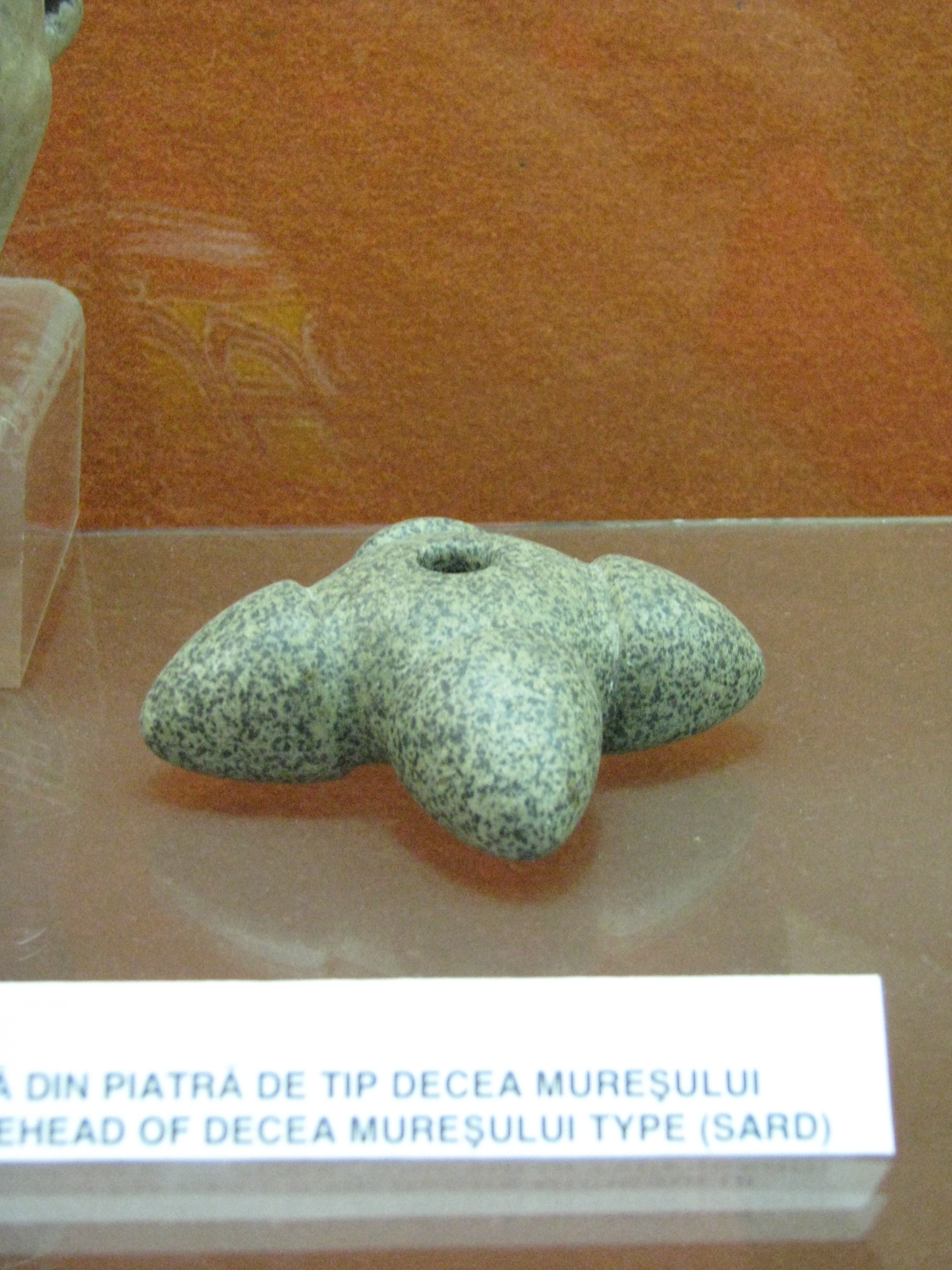
Stone mace head of Decea Mureșului type found at Șard, Alba. On display at the National Museum of the Union, Alba Iulia

The end of this culture has been associated with the entry into central Transylvania by the bearers of the Decea Mureșului culture/horizon and the Gornești culture.

The graves at Decea Mureșului, according to some, are a continuation of the rituals of Iclod, whereas according to others, they are hard proof of the penetration of central Transylvania by a north-Pontic population. The presence of red ochre scattered over the skeletons, or laid at their feet in the form of little balls, as well as other ritual elements find better analogies, however, in the necropolis at Mariupol in south Ukraine.

==== Gornești culture ====
The Gornești culture, characterized by the occurrence of the so-called high-necked milk pots with two small protuberances pulled at the margin and drilled vertically, is a continuation of the [Românești] (featuring receptacles with bird bill protuberances and decorated with step or nettle incisions), in turn descended from the Tisa culture in the developed Neolithic period.

The settlements of the neo-Eneolithic cultures were located on the low or high river terraces, on hilltops or hillspurs and consisted in several dwellings whose positions sometimes observed particular rules. Recent research has tended to focus on the defense systems (ditches and scarps) of these sites. The culture strata are thick and superposed forming at times regular tells.

The dwellings of this period were of several types. The earth houses displayed an oval shaped hole, with a maximum of 5–6 metres (16–20 ft) and a minimum of 3 m (9.8 ft) in diameter. On one of the edges a simple fireplace was built out of a smoothed layer of clay. The thatched roof was conical or elongated and was supported by a trestle. The one room rectangular surface dwellings are also documented as dating back to the beginning of the Neolithic. They had wattle walls pasted with clay mixed with straw. The roof was double sloping, and the floor was made of trodden clay. The Cucuteni dwellings in south-east Transylvania are spacious (40–100 square metres (430–1,080 sq ft) and more), often have a platform and are divided into two or more rooms.

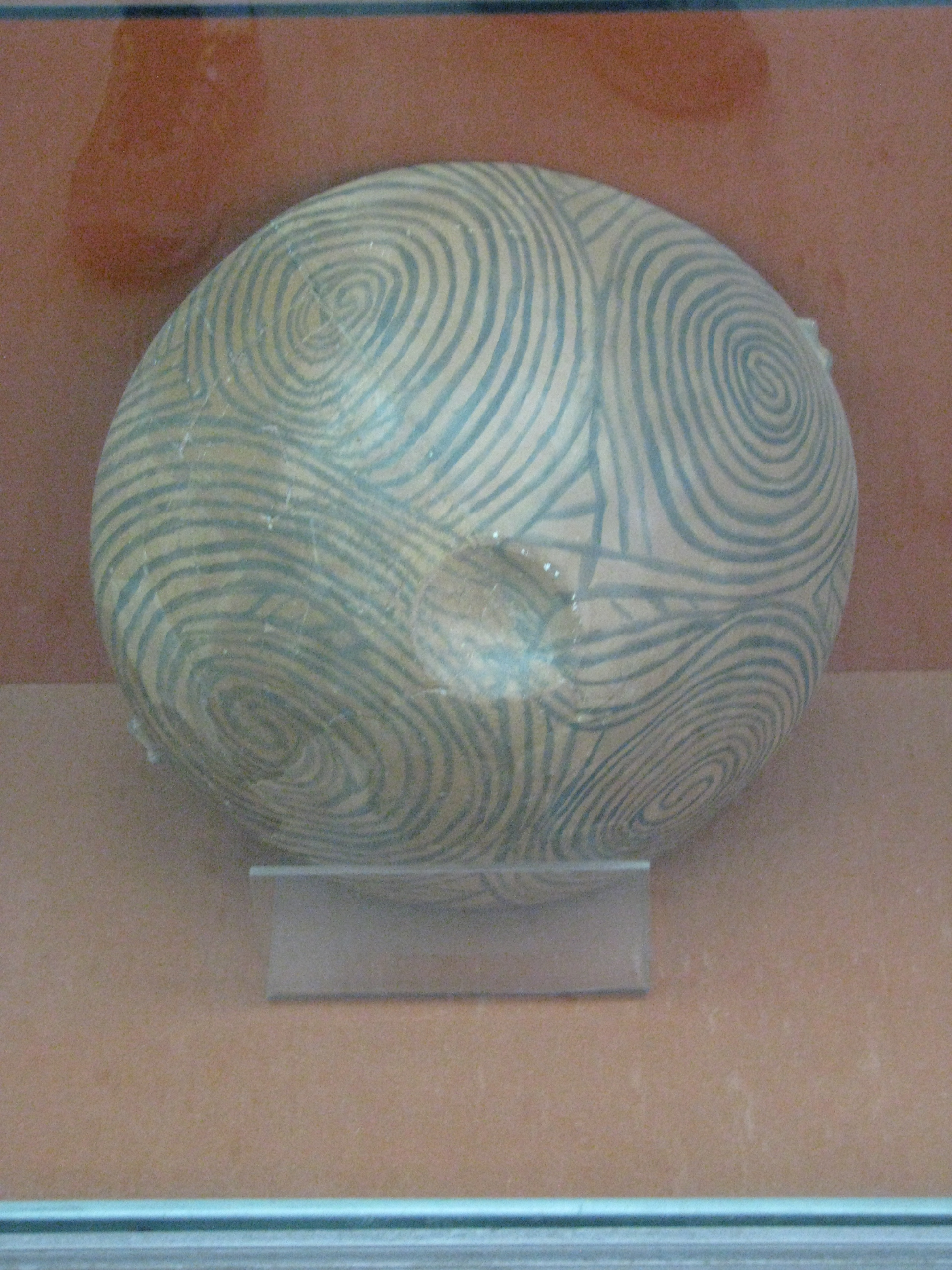
Vessel from the Middle Eneolithic Period found at Cheile Turzii. On display at the National Museum of the Union, Alba Iulia

Neo-Eneolithic sculpture is represented by cultic figures, idols, and talismans fashioned out of bone, stone or clay. These are human or animal representations conveyed by stylized or exaggerated body parts. Among the thousand anthropomorphous statues discovered, the female ones, symbols of fertility and fecundity, prevail by far.

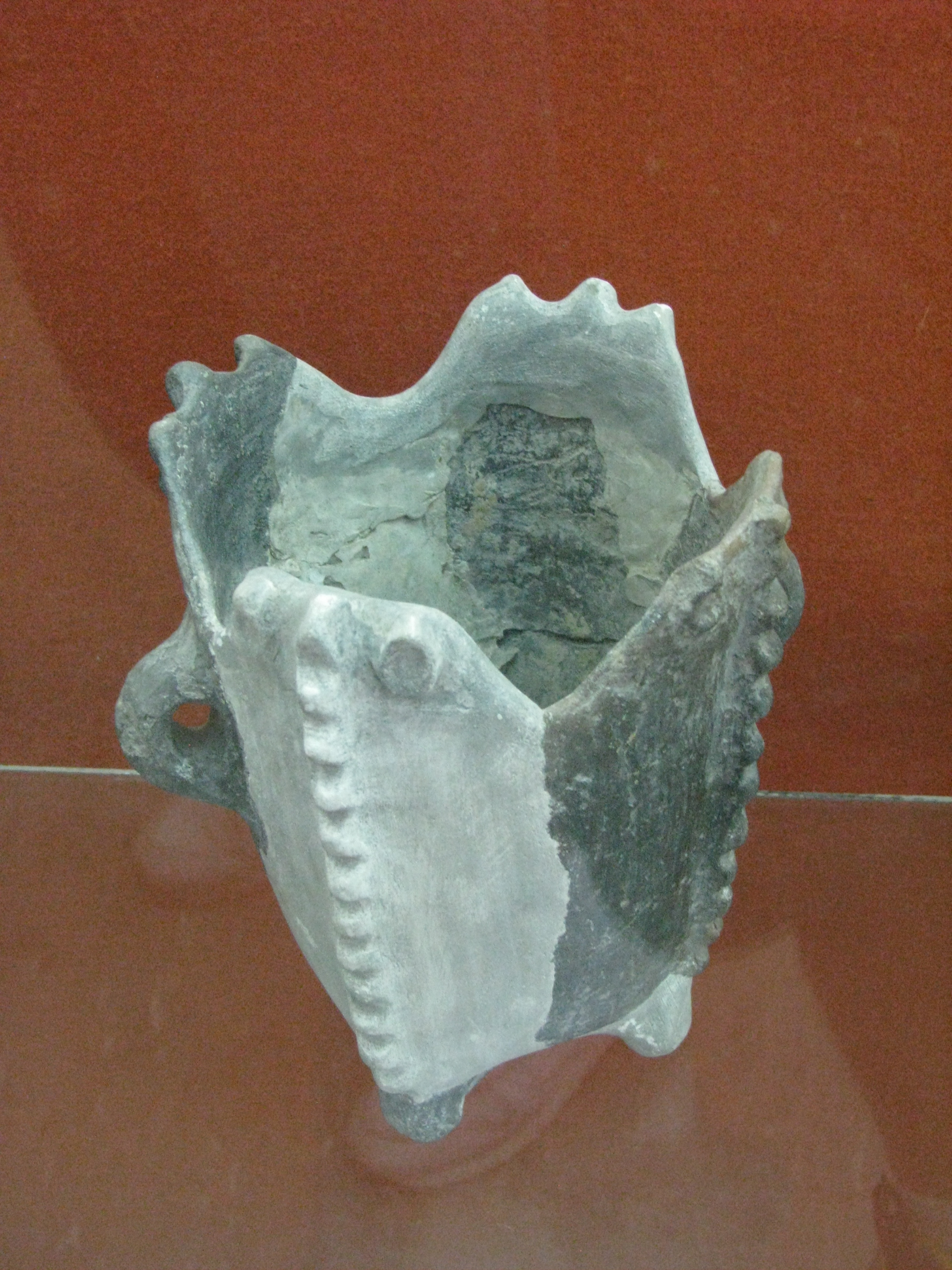
Herculane-Cheile Turzii culture vessel, dated 3800–3500 BC (Middle Eneolithic Period), found at Cheile Turzii. On display at the National Museum of the Union, Alba Iulia

Copper was first used for fashioning small implements or ornaments (needles, awls, fishing hooks, pendants, etc.), while gold was used solely for aesthetic and decorative purposes. For a long time the items were produced by the technique of hammering, for the technique of the casting mould as well as that of "cire perdue" (lost wax) emerged much later. Although there is no proof of the provenance of the first metal items, they are seemingly local rather than imported products. That does not necessarily suggest that metallurgy was the invention of the local population, for it might have been introduced as a result of contact with regions where metal processing had started earlier (in the East or the Caucasus).

The Eneolithic marked a notable advancement in the development of metallurgy. Throughout this period copper artifacts are present in the settlements, in grave inventories or even in deposits (assemblies of whole or fragmentary objects concentrated in one, usually isolated, place). This period also marks a high incidence of flat axes, pins, simple or multi-spiral bracelets or necklaces. The most complex of all Eneolithic achievements is the axe. These weapon-implements are bound to the late phases of the Cucuteni, Decea Mureșului, and Bodrogkeresztúr-Gornești cultures. The gold Eneolithic items, outnumbered by the copper, actually constitute the beginning of goldsmithing in the Transylvanian lands. An outstanding artifact was the great gold pendant in the thesaurus of Moigrad, Sălaj County, which is 30 cm (12 in) in height and weighs 750 g (26 oz).

We know little about the racial types of the Transylvanian Neolithic population. The area of some of the cultures, for instance Cucuteni, lack funeral finds, for they are the expression of ritual practices that elude archeological methods. The little anthropological data available (Gura Baciului, Iclod) suggests Mediterranean-type physical features.

The role of the invasion of the pastoral tribes coming from the north-Pontic (supposedly Indo-European kinship) in bringing to an end the Eneolithic culture of sedentary farmers, represents one of the hotly debated issues among specialists in the prehistory of south-eastern Europe. What once might have seemed exclusively a migration of nomadic tribes, now may be understood as a socio-economic transformation of the local population—its adaptation to the new environment, to the evolution of society (the increasing role of the animal breeders and shepherds, the development of metallurgy, extended mobility, the increasingly military role of the elites, changes in the belief systems, etc.).

In conclusion, the Eneolithic was a period of stability, in which the sedentary populations created a spectacular civilization.

== Bronze Age ==
(3200) 2700–1100 BC)

Approximate extent of the Corded Ware horizon with adjacent 3rd millennium cultures, like Baden culture (after EIEC).

For a long time the Romanian Bronze Age had been divided into four periods, but the archeological facts have imposed in the last decades the use of a three-part system: Early, Middle, and Late Bronze.

As communities acquired the secrets of alloying brass and arsenic, tin, zinc, or lead, achieving the first items in bronze, the long period during which stone constituted the main raw material for fashioning implements and weapons was coming to an end. The emergence and development of bronze metallurgy is accompanied by numerous substantial changes in economic and social life, in the spiritual life, and in the arts. The ensemble of these modifications – archeologically identifiable especially midway in the Bronze Age, yet already prefigured early on in the transition period from the Eneolithic to the Bronze Age – indicates a civilization far more sophisticated than we had imagined.

=== Baden culture, Coțofeni culture ===
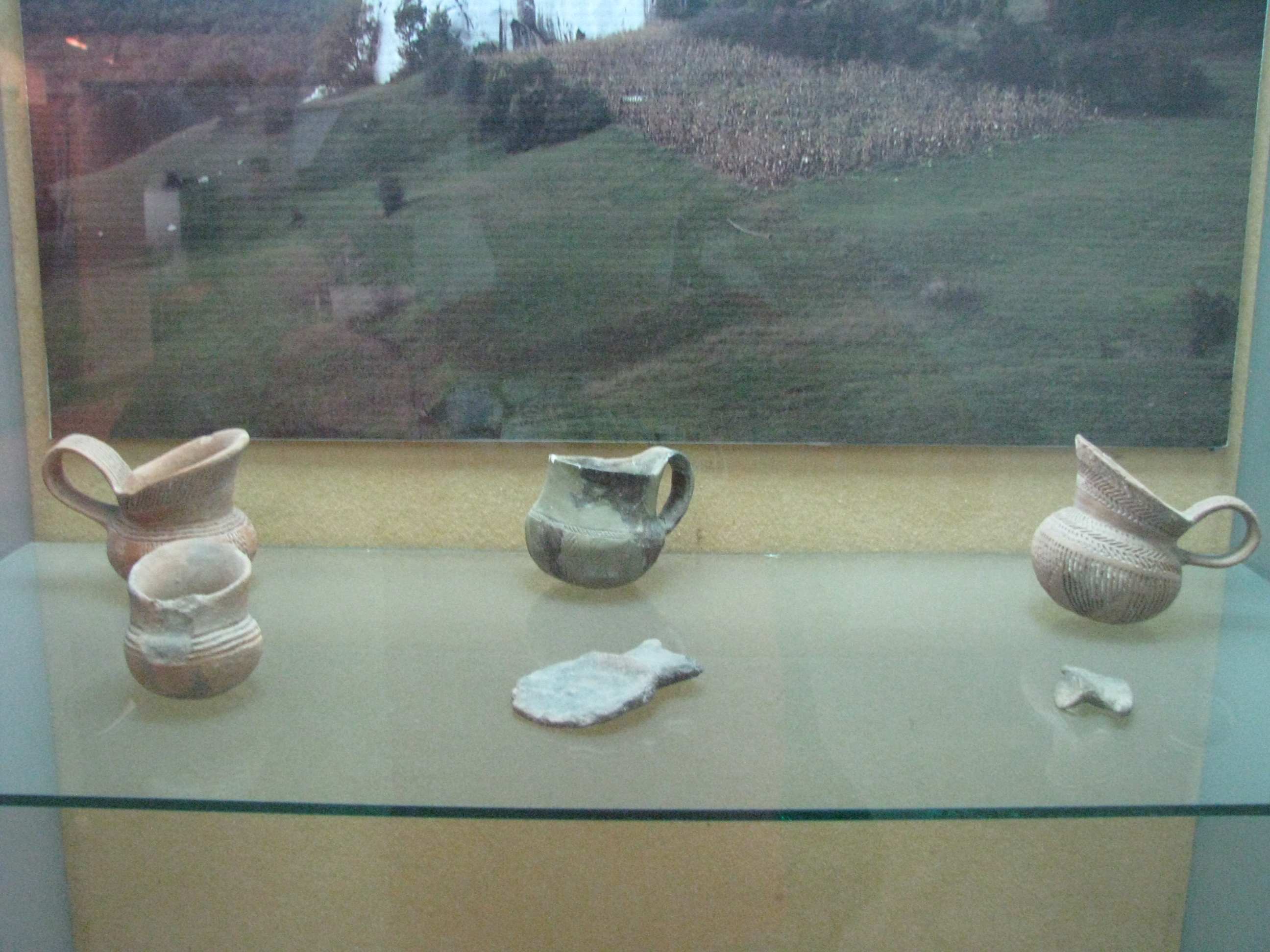
Coțofeni culture vessels, stone and bone tools, in display at the National Museum of the Union, Alba Iulia

The first stage of the Early Bronze Age is a genuine cultural mosaic, juxtaposing transitory civilizations with those typical of the Bronze Age. For the first, the most typical is the Baden–Coțofeni cultural bloc, which perpetuated in many aspects a transitory lifestyle, but evolved in parallel to the pre-Schneckenberg and Schneckenberg civilisations, which were more active in taking over the products of the Aegean-Anatolian Early Bronze. One can no longer speak of Eneolithic or neo-Eneolithic cultures, as defined by this historical period, for the changes occurring in the social structure are radical. The rise in status of the chieftains, indicated by the erection of tumulus funeral monuments, the different type of metallurgy, the different type of economy based on greater mobility as evinced by the impressive number of settlements belonging to the Coțofeni culture.

During the second stage, in the center of Transylvania there develops a cultural group bearing the name of the locality of Copăceni, Cluj County, which favored the locations afforded by the elevated sites in the eastern, and probably western, arch of the Western Carpathians and the upper basin of the Someș rivers. Their main pursuits were agriculture, animal breeding and ore extraction. They had surface dwellings, medium-sized (3x4m) with a rectangular layout, and pottery displays mainly high-necked pots with a short bottom portion often decorated with barbotine. Frequently the pots' rims are thickened and decorated with rope impressions. The dead are buried in tumuli such as those at Cheile Aiudului, Cheile Turzii, and Cheile Turului. The Copăceni group evolved in parallel to the Șoimuș and Jigodin groups, the former in the south-west, and the latter in south-east Transylvania.

Finally, the third stage is the least known, and is characterized by the use of ceramics with brush decorations and textile impressions.

Non-ferrous metallurgy in Early Bronze Age, given the substantial fall in production as compared to the Eneolithic, should be regarded as undergoing some sort of realignment, or repositioning, rather than indicating an acute decline. The causes of this phenomenon are many and diverse (exhaustion of the usual mineral sources, major technological changes, disturbing ethnic reshuffling, etc.). Significantly, the first bronze items (brass alloyed with arsenic, and later tin) now emerged.

The archeological sites of this period have uncovered more varied jewelry (hair rings, bracelets, necklaces, pendants made in copper, bronze or gold), poniards, flat axes as well as 'raised margin' axes. Yet the most important achievement of the age is the single-edged axe. Apparently the majority of these products were manufactured in local workshops. The proof is the numerous moulds for casting axes discovered at Leliceni, Harghita County, part of the Jigodin group. Hard to ignore is the often evoked ritual hole at Fântânele, part of the Copăceni group, where were found fragments of moulds for casting metal items (little chisels, poniards, massive axes), testifying that the level of the Vâlcele, Cluj County, type of axe had certainly been attained.

=== Periam-Pecica/Mureș culture ===
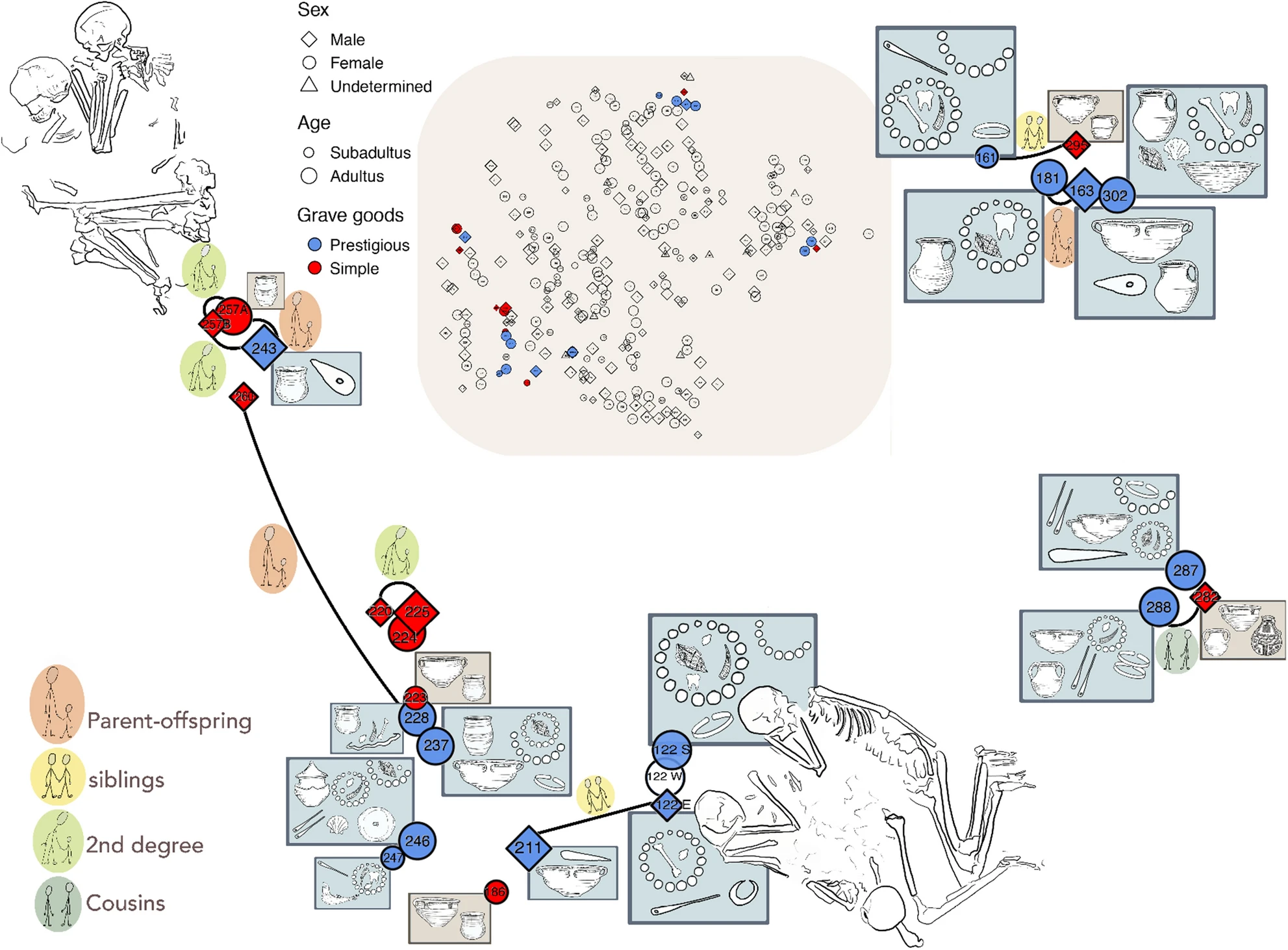
Mureș culture burials

A Middle and Late Bronze Ages culture existed in the diffusion of the archeological cultures on the lower course of the Mureș River, the Periam-Pecica/Mureș culture emerged as the earliest of the five regional cultural groups.

The sites include Șanțul Mare, Pecica, Ziridava.

=== Otomani culture ===
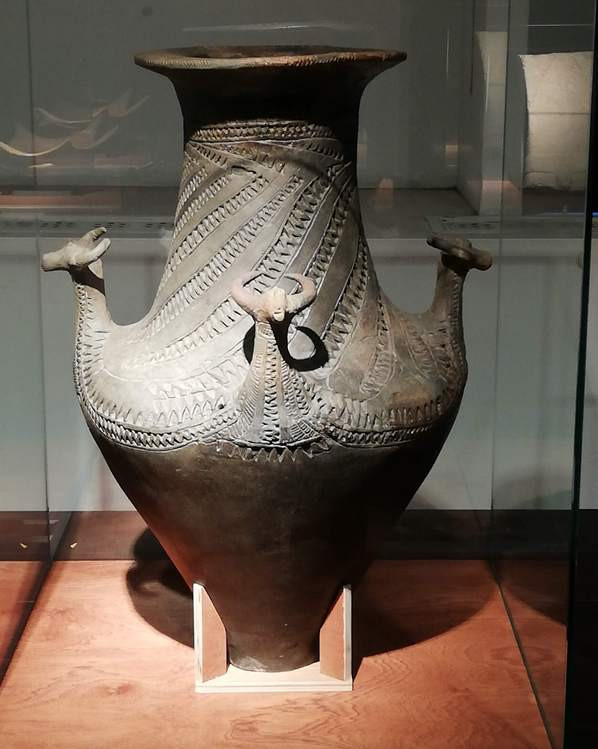
Lăpuș Group pottery, 13th century BC

The late period of the Bronze Age brings to Transylvania a marked process of cultural uniformity, whose direct manifestation is the local variety of the Noua culture. It is now, too, that the Lăpuș groups spins off the Suciu de Sus culture while the western areas are covered by the Cehăluț and Igrița groups.

Ceramics are the prehistoric artifacts that have been available in the greatest quantity and variety, thus providing the foundation of all of the above-mentioned cultural classifications.

The pattern repertoire of these cultures is abstract and geometric. The Wietenberg, Otomani and Suciu de Sus cultures, regularly and predominantly, displayed dynamically designed solar symbols (continuous spirals, crosses with spirals etc.) in the early stages of their cultural development. The same symbols appeared, in static form, (crosses, spiked wheels, rays, etc.) for the other cultures (Vatina, Mureș). Natural elements occurred rarely, and mainly as figurative art.

Most remarkable in this context were the super-elevated handles, shaped into ram heads, of a large size receptacle found south of the Carpathians, at Sărata Monteoru, Buzău County. The motif is repeated in markedly stylized forms on numerous pot handles of the Wietenberg culture. They were abstract to the extent that an animal was represented by a single defining element, for example a ram's horns. The same culture exhibits two rare achievements: a fragment of a cult wagon, exquisitely decorated, with both extremities ending in protomes, shaped as sheep-goat heads, discovered at Lechința de Mureș, Mureș County, and a gold axe displaying a fine engraving of a human silhouette next to a bovine silhouette, whose provenance is the thesaurus of Țufalău, Covasna County.

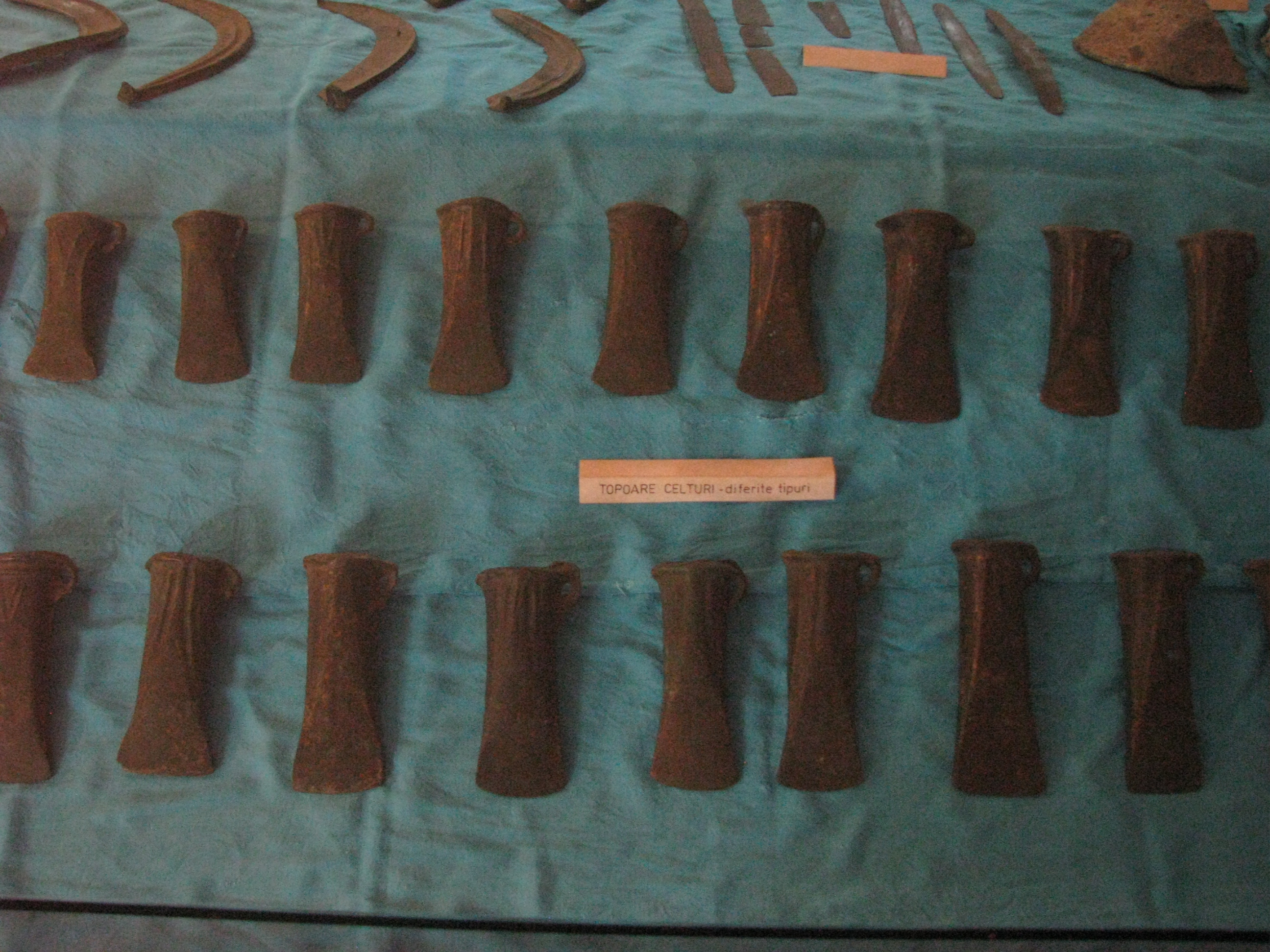
Bronze Age Celt type axes at the Aiud History Museum, Aiud

Close scrutiny of the production technique of the more complex vessels—the perfect duct of some complex decoration patterns—strengthens the probability that the ceramics were produced by specialists. This does not exclude the possibility that other social groups, mainly children and adolescents, performed a secondary role. The transport of receptacles over long distances, in the absence of good roads, must have been an equally difficult operation, requiring itinerant craftsmen or special workshops near the more important centers.

The partial representations, the schematic physiognomies, as well as the faithful thematic rendering, though rare, all speak of a new symbolic expression that dominated the art of statuettes too. The moulding of the zoomorphic and anthropomorphic statuettes no longer attain the rich realism of the prior epoch, which is explained by the changes occurring in the religious and cult structure of the society. The incised and engraved decorations focus particularly on the details of the costume and the jewelry worn (hair rings, diadems, pendants, necklaces, etc.)

The importance of the settlements, as a constructed and limited human space for the prehistoric population, is graphically suggested by Mircea Eliade, when he interprets them as symbolic of the "centre of the world". The analyzed archeological sites evolved from simple groupings of lodges to complex urban facilities, directed towards maintaining collective lifestyle quality, ensuring the protection of life and goods, and meeting specific social, economic, defense and cultic needs.

Thus, there are central sites, with long-term developments, epicenters of a larger territory (Derşida, Otomani, etc.), and secondary sites evolving at the level of hamlets or seasonal dwellings (Suatu, Cluj-Napoca, etc.). The Otomani civilization in particular features a marked settlement hierarchy manifested in the ordered positioning of the dwellings, suggesting a pre-urban tendency. For instance, at Otomani – Cetățuie a circular settlement has been investigated, located on a hilltop and enclosed by a ditch and rampart. The dwellings were distributed in two concentric circles around an empty space at the center. The same organizing system is evident at Sălacea, where a megaron-type sanctuary has been explored.

Prior to this century, the Intra-Carpathian space has been predominantly a land of farmers, as well as of craftsmen and animal breeders. In settlements belonging to the classical period of the Bronze Age were found charred seeds, numerous farming implements, grinding mills of diverse types, all attesting the intensive cultivation of grains. The widespread use of a primitive type of plough drawn by oxen is indicated by a great number of plough shares made of deer horn. Wheat, millet, barley, and rye were found in several Bronze Age sites. A Wietenberg ritual complex researched recently at Cluj-Napoca uncovered charred buckwheat, chick-peas and sesame seeds, and the ritual complexes at Oarța de Jos (Maramureș County) revealed the use of notch weed and sorrel.

The animal economy of the Bronze Age, with the familiar local variations, was based on pig, sheep and goat breeding, with a decline in large horned cattle. Thus, the inhabitants of the Vatina and Otomani cultures seem to have focused on breeding swine, sheep, goats, and on intensive hunting; while among the Wietenberg and Noua communities cattle were most common, used both for food and for traction, followed by sheep, goats, swine and horses. Horses were constantly present and revolutionized transportation and communication. The wagon with big wheels, later with spikes, emerged and spread, either as a warring and hunting vehicle, or to symbolize social status.

=== Monteoru culture ===
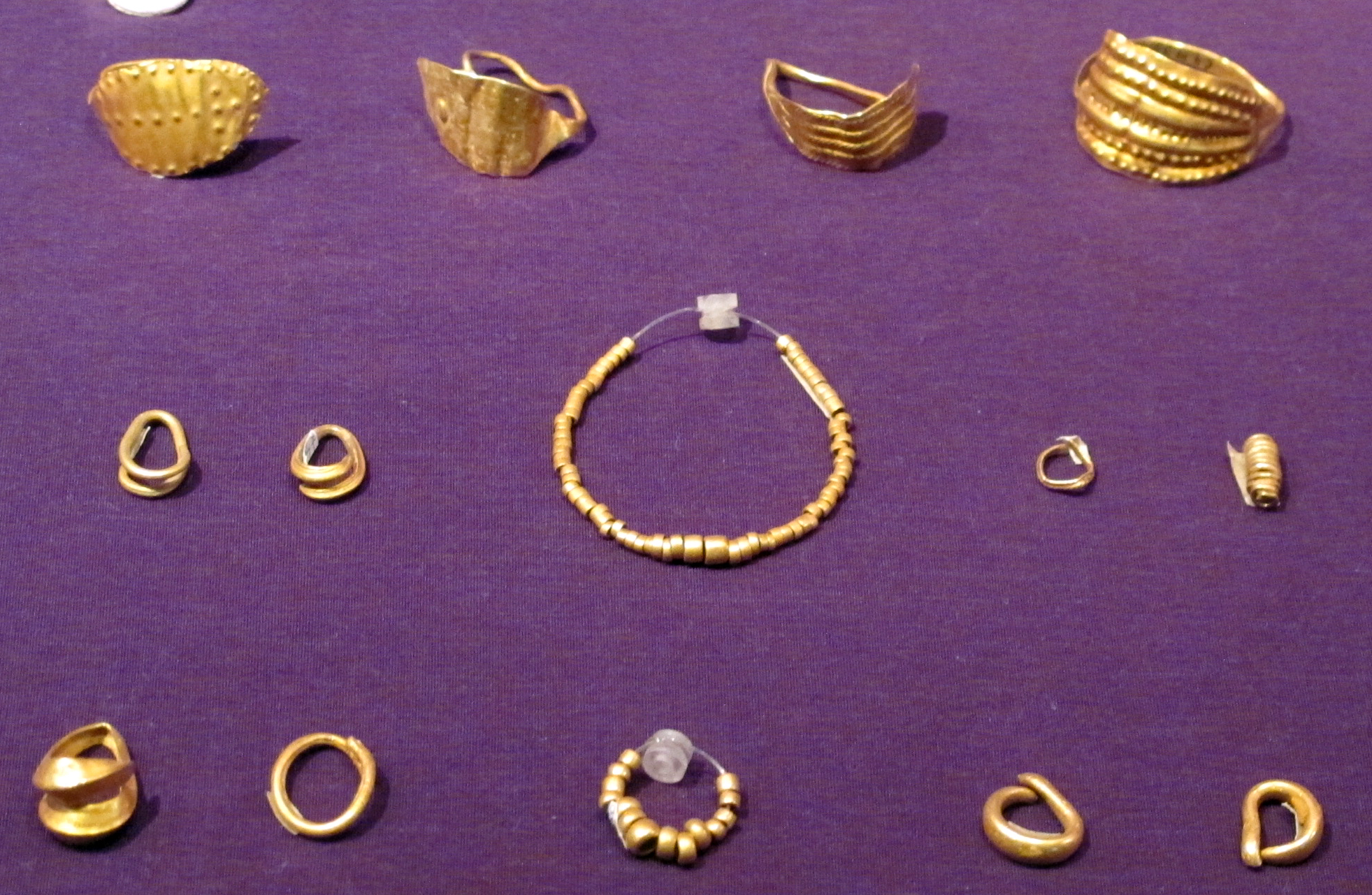
Monteoru culture, gold artefacts

The food provided by agriculture and animal breeding was supplemented by hunting and fishing. Their proportion within the economy varied among the communities of the Bronze Age. For instance, at Sărata Monteoru (the Monteoru culture) they represented 8.11% and at Pecica, of the Mureș culture, 17.95%, in contrast to the area of the Noua culture where the percentage of hunting was, as a rule, much below 3%. Deer remained the most prized game in the Bronze Age, followed by wild boar and roebuck. A larger and more constant flow of the rivers, determined by an increasingly wet climate, is evident from the large fish bones found in many Bronze Age settlements.

There is no clear indication whether agriculture or animal breeding predominated within Bronze Age communities, with research revealing that both were being practiced together within the same area. But as populations stabilized, they tended towards a pastoral East and a farm-dominated West.

Men became more economically productive, due to improved metallurgy and better animal husbandry, and the use of draught animals in agriculture. Men acquired a dominant position within the family and in society.

For the Bronze Age people, the mountains provided hunting, timber and fruit, and held the copper and precious metal ores. Copper, silver and gold have always constituted major assets of the Intra-Carpathian region. The Apuseni Mountains are especially rich, as are the ores in the Maramureș Mountains, or the copper in the Giurgeului Mountains and Baia de Aramă. Metal outcrops are claimed to have been searched for by specialists, who perhaps then kept them secret. By washing gravel, or by digging pits for nuggets, the ore seekers satisfied the demand of local, prehistoric Europe, and even for the Mycenaean elites.

The unique direct proof of prehistoric exploitation of non-ferrous metals in Transylvania is the stone axe found in a gallery in Căraci (Hunedoara County). An impressive anthropomorphous statue was discovered at Baia de Criș Hunedoara or Ciceu-Mihăiești, Bistrița-Năsăud County. It portrayed implements (pickaxe and basket), whose absolutely sensational analogs were found in the photos of miners, taken by B. Roman at the middle of the last century, strongly suggesting that the mining of non-ferrous metals was also performed underground.

Furthermore, the Natural History Museum in Vienna preserves two hair rings with the caption 'Dealul Vulcoi (Roșia Montană), district Câmpeni, region Cluj'. The museum in Lupșa exhibits a miner's axe and a club, both having come from the Lupșa valley. These exhibits demonstrate the presence of prehistoric miners in the ore-rich Apuseni Mountains.

Increasingly, traces of people involved in bronze-related activities are found. There are finished or semi-finished items, moulds, deposits or isolated items. The tracks of quarries and work-sheds are rather frail, firstly, because of subsequent exploitation, secondly, because of far too few exhaustive archeological investigations. The little workshop for moulding bronze pieces in the Wietenberg settlement at Derșida is well known.

The most complete and spectacular data related to metal processing workshops gathered so far, although partial, come from Palatca, Cluj County, from the Late Bronze Age, where the workshop was in close proximity to the dwelling area. The research has brought to light numerous moulds for casting metal items, unfortunately extremely fragmented, the fragment of a bronze cake, rectangular in shape, with curved sides, a bronze anvil, slag, several fragments of hand-mills, burnt out fireplaces and diverse rocks. Space in the workshop was organized in a complex way, depending on the current activities (selecting and grinding rocks, cutting and melting cakes, casting and retouching items). The presence at Palatca of the plano-convex type bronze cakes and, for the first time ever on Romanian territory, of the Aegean type, as well as the probable absence of metal reduction kilns demonstrate that this operation was performed in the mining areas.

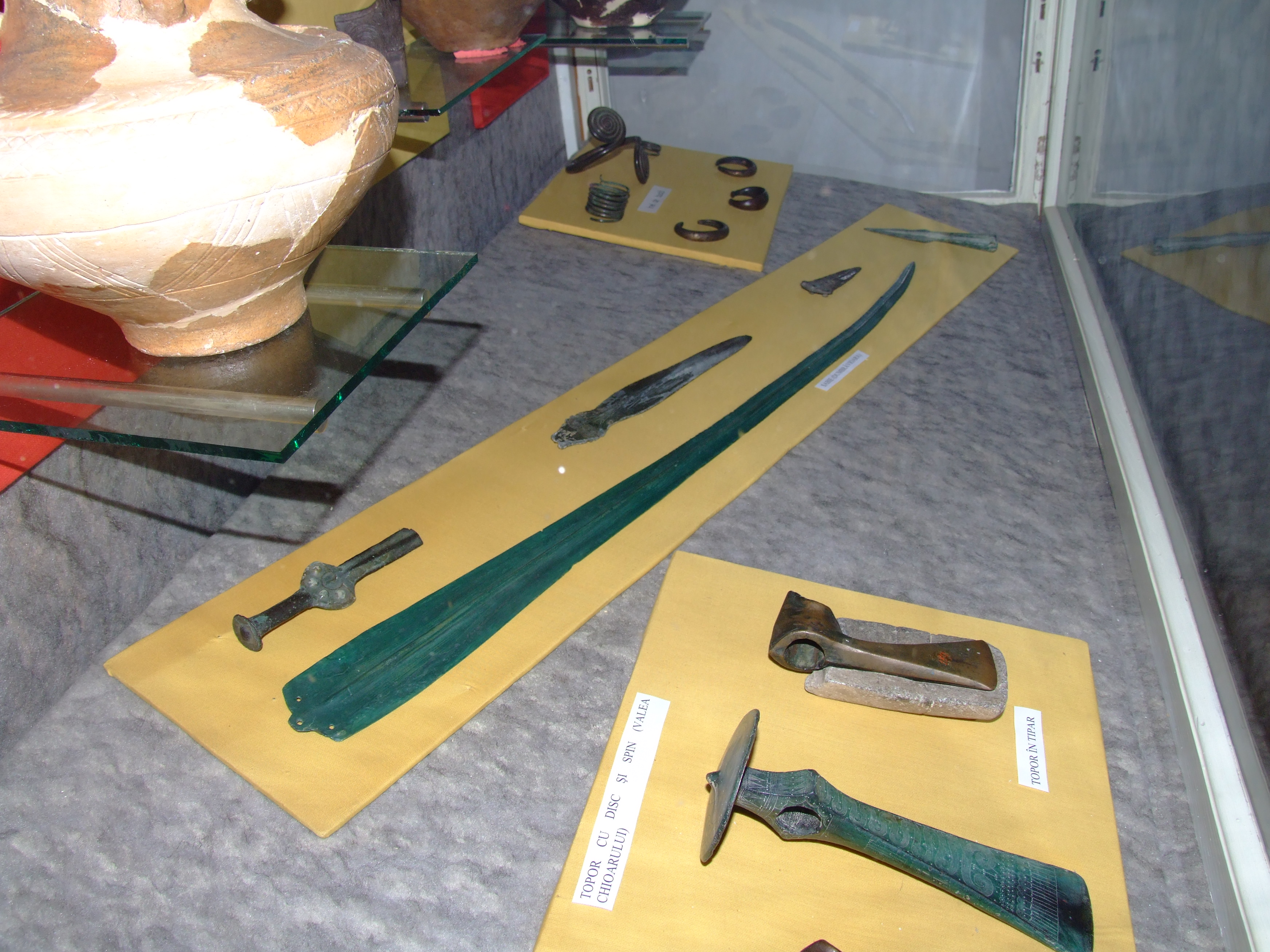
On the left, Mycenaean bronze sword found at Dumbrăvioara, Mureș County. In display at the National Museum of Transylvanian History, Cluj-Napoca

The conversion of minerals to metal by means of fire was a process accompanied by rituals, magic formulas, and chanting to bring about the "birth of the metal". At the foundation of a kiln at Palatca formed by a burnt out clay fireplace and several slabs of whetstone laid one on top of the other, probably round in shape, a clay vessel had been deposited. Close to the workshop, a large ritual area has been explored. Receptacles with offerings were placed in multiple hypostases next to ore-refining items (hand-mills, bronze items, ash, coal, etc.), underneath or on top of the whetstone slabs, head down or head up.

The mass of the ethnographic data which associates the ground with the belly, the mine with the womb, and the ore with the embryo, speaks of the sexuality of the mineral realm, and of the blacksmith's belongings and implements. The production of items is the equivalent of a birth and takes on an obstetrical dimension. The blacksmith's implements have a sexual connotation. The anvils, for instance, are identified with the female principle. In this context, the closeness between the shape of the orifice for setting in place the anvil at Palatca, and the female generating organ was not coincidental. Another unique discovery was the meteorite. Meteorites coming from the skies fell on Earth with a celestial sacred charge and were often associated with the blacksmiths' activity.

The scarcity of settlements with metallurgic activity also hints at the possible existence of itinerant artisans and/or the centralization of the activity. This new development in bronze processing denotes a specialization in production with the appearance of prospectors, blacksmiths and merchants, who exported the surplus produce. Through exchange, the Transylvanian and east-Hungarian type axes with spiked discs spread as far east as Bug, and to the north, to the Oder and Elbe region, Pomerania included, a phenomenon connected with The Great Amber Road and the exploitation of brass and tin in the Elbe region. The metal artisans are not in power, but rather work under the control of an elite, which had seen the contingencies between metal and wealth, technology, war, and even the social and cultic structure.

The first level with gift depositaries consisted in two main themes: the sword and the axe, outlining the role of the two weapons in the Intra-Carpathian warrior. The lance must have been yet another important weapon, but is a lesser find. The characteristics of the period are the bronze deposits at Apa, Satu Mare County (two swords, three war axes and a defense bracer), Ighiu, Alba County (two axes with spiked discs and four defense bracers) and at Săpânța, Maramureș County (a spiked disc axe of type A2, exquisitely decorated, older than all the other pieces, spiral bracers, arm bands, and cordiform pendants). In the following stage, undecorated bronze items (single-edged axe and spiked disc axe), were produced and stored in ever increasing quantities. Many continued in the earlier style, but were also new types. Among the best creations of Bronze Age metallurgy were the Mycenaean type swords, whose dating is still debated.

=== Wietenberg culture ===
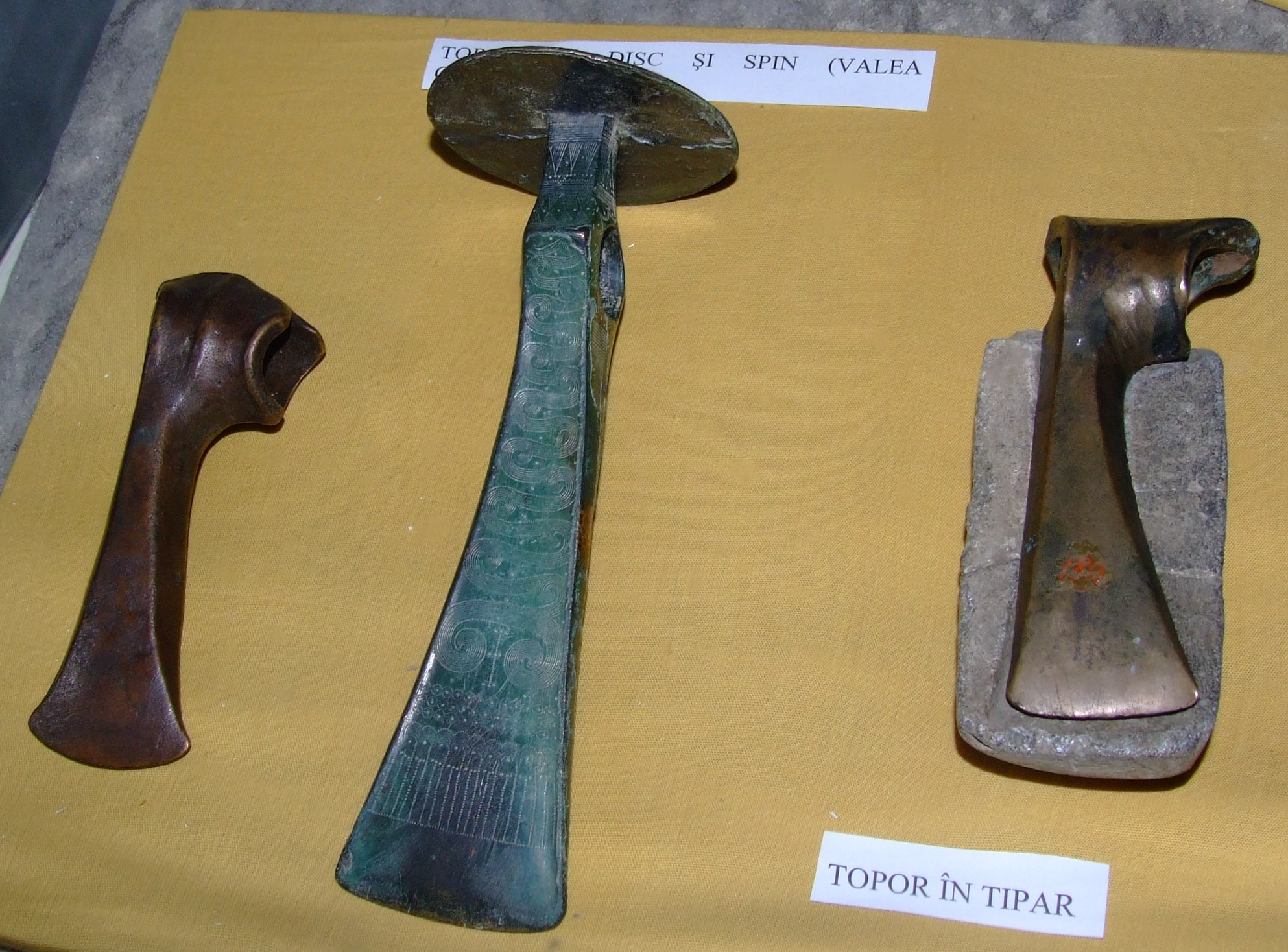
Wietenberg culture battle axes found at Valea Chioarului, Maramureș County, Romania. In display at the National Museum of Transylvanian History, Cluj-Napoca

The thesaurus found in 1840 at Țufalău, Covasna County, in the area of the Wietenberg culture, speaks clearly of the wealth and refined tastes of a social elite. Kept in a clay pot, the thesaurus contained several solid gold axes, ornamental phalerae with spiral motifs, hair rings, one bracelet and one large gold piece. A great number of gold and silver items (bracelets, loop rings, etc.) were found at Oarța de Sus, with accurate stratigraphy, in a ritual space belonging to the Wietenberg culture. Such thesauruses containing hundreds of pieces weighing several kilograms, such as those at Sarasău, Maramureș County) or Hinova, Mehedinți County, are few and likely to represent the community treasure. They are outnumbered by those displaying fewer items which seem to have been the private property of some leaders.

Metal, bone, stone or clay processing were most certainly operations performed by specialists, who worked in small workshops, or sometimes larger ones such as those at Derșida or Palatca.

There certainly existed many wooden tools or receptacles, but they have not been preserved. Animal skin processing for fashioning clothing items, shields, harnesses, etc. must have been widespread.

The Bronze Age necropoles reveal funeral practices peculiar to each community. The graves, with variations specific to the different cultural entities, by their design and their contents attest to an advanced spiritual culture. Incineration (Wietenberg culture) or inhumation (Noua culture), the placing of offering-items alongside the deceased, all imply abstract thinking and belief in the afterlife.

Archeological investigations alone are too few and disparate for a detailed reconstruction of the religions of the Bronze Age people. The solar symbols, dynamic or static in form, (continuing spirals, simple crosses or crosses with spirals, spiked wheels, rays, etc.) are so numerous that they could be illustrated in a separate volume, and speak clearly about the prevailing role of this cult.

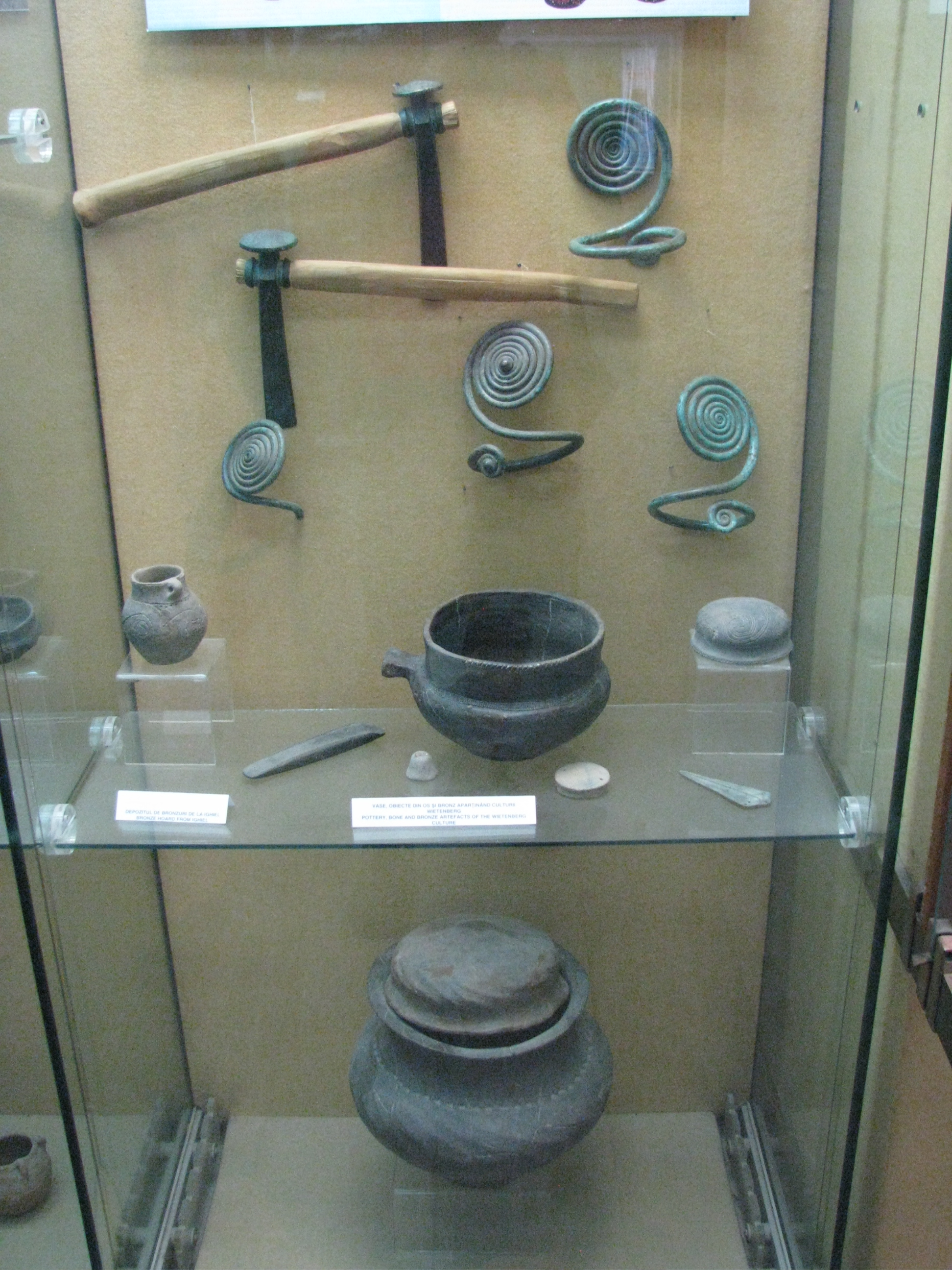
Pottery, bone and bronze artefacts of the Wietenberg culture. In display at National Museum of the Union, Alba Iulia

Cultic practices were performed by the people of the Bronze Age in diverse locations: in mountains, trees, springs, rivers, clearings or even, as noted, in specially assigned places inside the settlements. At Sălacea, Bihor County, in the southern area of the settlement of the Otomani culture there was a cultic edifice, a megaron type sanctuary measuring 5.20x8.80m, with a porch with two in antis pillars, a pronaos with an elevated altar and a naos with two fixed altars. The solid crust on the altar surface testifies to the rituals involving fire, while the walls nearby were provided with circular orifices (a ventilating system and alternative lighting of the altars depending on sunrise and sunset). On one of them were found nine clay weights, three curved stone knives, and one cylindrical clay stand. The other had nine clay weights in miniature, three curved stone knives and one cylindrical stand.

The symbolic value of the items and their number speak for themselves. The walls were decorated with plaster work with geometrical motifs (spirals, continuing spirals) randomly painted in white. Close by the entrance an infant grave has been researched, possibly partially deposited as an offering. Another founding ritual is encountered in Early Bronze Age at Copăceni, where under the lodge's floorboard were found five human skeletons (one female adult and four fetuses). Judging by their position – the female in an obstetric position with the fetuses around her basin and one between her inferior members – it could well be a mother and her infants.

All of these practices, judging by the archeological data mentioned above, as well as being based on other analogies, were accompanied by offerings, libations, chanting and cultic dancing. Apart from some daily festivals (sewing, harvesting, reaping, sheep loss or recovery, etc.), there must have been annual or multi-annual festivals of the whole community, or of part of it. This has been made clear from the above-mentioned research at Oarța de Sus – Ghiile Botii. The divinities guarding this space were in harmony with the weapons, ornaments or gifts personal or social in nature (grains, plants, food), with the animal, even human, sacrifices, with ceramics and bone, as well as with gold, silver or bronze. This wide variety of offerings, deposited in the course of grand religious ceremonies, indicate either an all-encompassing deity, or else several deities all worshiped within the same space.

In the Wietenberg culture area at Cluj-Napoca the underground deposition of offerings in a ritual hole and their contents (numerous receptacles filled with charred seeds) speaks of an agricultural ritual, one which was chthonic, dedicated to a harvest-giving deity ruling fertility. In this case sacred agrarian rituals, whose tradition is evident in the historical epochs too, was intended to inaugurate and imprint a rhythm to the agrarian calendar, and to achieve union between sun and soil through the agrarian ceremonial. The repeated occurrence of the solar motifs covering the walls of the receptacles deposited, typically masculine, might be speaking of the joining of the two spheres: earth-sun, female-male, immobile-mobile, thus demonstrating the dualism of creeds in the Bronze Age.

The link between the Carpathian region and the Mediterranean civilizations has often been the subject of debates, offering quite divergent opinions concerning their dating, direction, and significance. One of the main arguments concerns the bronze swords discovered on the territory of Romania. These long thrusting swords (symbols of dignity and power as well as formidable weapons) are obviously local products. The decorating motifs based on spirals and fine windings on bronze or gold weapons, on bone or horn items, are near to perfection, especially in the areas of the Wietenberg and Otomani cultures. If created independently of the Aegean models, they cannot be too far apart in time.

The glass in the Noua graves at Cluj-Napoca, and the Dentalium beads discovered at Derșida in a Wietenberg milieu, are also of Mediterranean origins. At Oarța de Sus on the shoulder of one of the cult receptacles are symbols in a line that are most certainly epigraphic. Similar images, also indicating a connection with southern civilizations, are found in the Otomani culture at Barca, Slovakia. Similarly, one of the bronze ingots at Palatca copies the well-known Aegean model. The striking similarities between the Wietenberg ceramics and the Apennine culture in northern Italy are difficult to explain. The assumption made long ago of a common generating center still stands, until final clarification.

In the same era, the metals produced on the slopes of the eastern arch of the Western Carpathians arrived in different ways in distant places all over Europe; so did the salt Transylvania is so rich in. Just as the obsidian, most probably exploited in the Bükk Mountains (Hungary), is encountered in the Wietenberg cultic complex discovered at Cluj-Napoca. The amber items in the deposit discovered at the Cioclovina cave came from the Baltic Sea, while the Caucasian influences are indicated by the axe discovered at Larga, Maramureș County.

The marked expansion of pan-European trade in middle and late Bronze Age created growing dependence between the different cultural groups, and an acceleration of uniformity in cultural values and produce. All of which sped up the general development of society and the passage to a new phase in historical evolution.

=== Noua culture ===
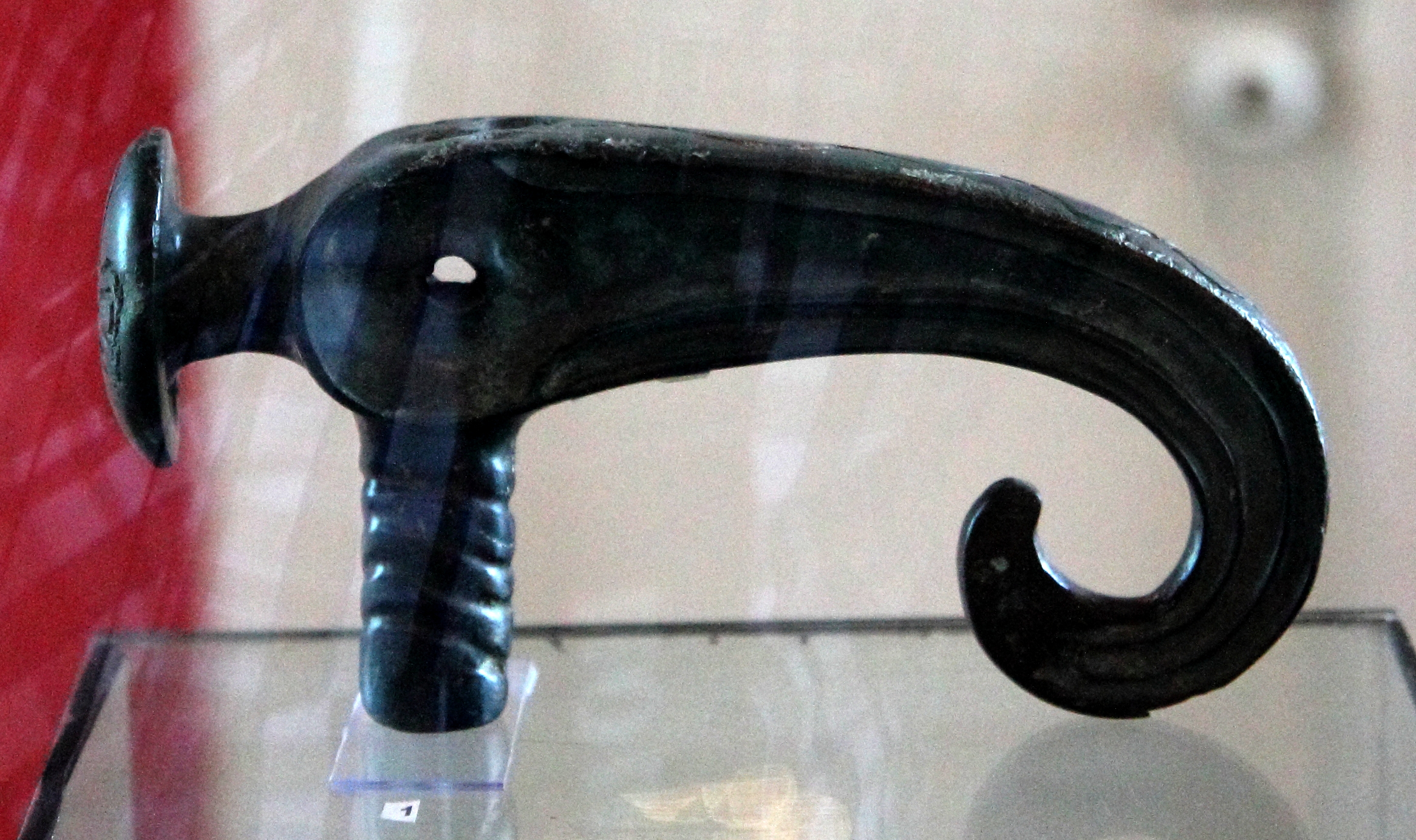
Bronze sceptre, Noua-Sabatinovka culture

The Late Bronze Age shows a marked increase in metallurgic production based on the discovery of new non-ferrous mineral sources and the adoption of upgraded technology. The eastern experience brought by the bearers of the Noua culture and the southern experience (through Central European connections) brought by some late derivatives of the Otomani culture, both grafted onto the undoubted local experience, made Transylvania the most prolific metallurgic center in prehistoric Europe.

The differences identified between the deposits of the period speak not of unitary series, but of types of deposits with a more limited geographic spread. One deposit, characterized by the almost exclusive presence of several types of axes, socked axes, bracelets and foot rings, delineates the area of diffusion of the Suciu de Sus culture. The deposits in the area of the post-Otomani groups (Igrița and Cehăluț) contain almost exclusively ornament items, mainly pendants and pins. Finally, in central and eastern Transylvania, in the area of the Noua culture, we encounter the third type of deposit with the prevailing Transylvanian type of socked axes and the sickle.

Only a small number of bronze items were found in settlements and cemeteries. Most of them have a fortuitous appearance in what we call deposits. Romanian archaeology has interpreted their storage as a proof of troubled times, yet today a new interpretation is gaining ground: they are cultic deposits functioning as offerings, or at times, as the result of prestigious inter-community auctions of the "potlatch" type. The arguments in favour are strong: long periods of peaceful development, the location of the deposits (confluence of rivers, lakes, springs, clearings, mild slopes looking east, etc.), the number of items, the arrangements, their manipulations (fired, bent, fragmentation through bending, etc.), etc. Moreover, there is no logic in the locals burying their arms in the face of a military threat.

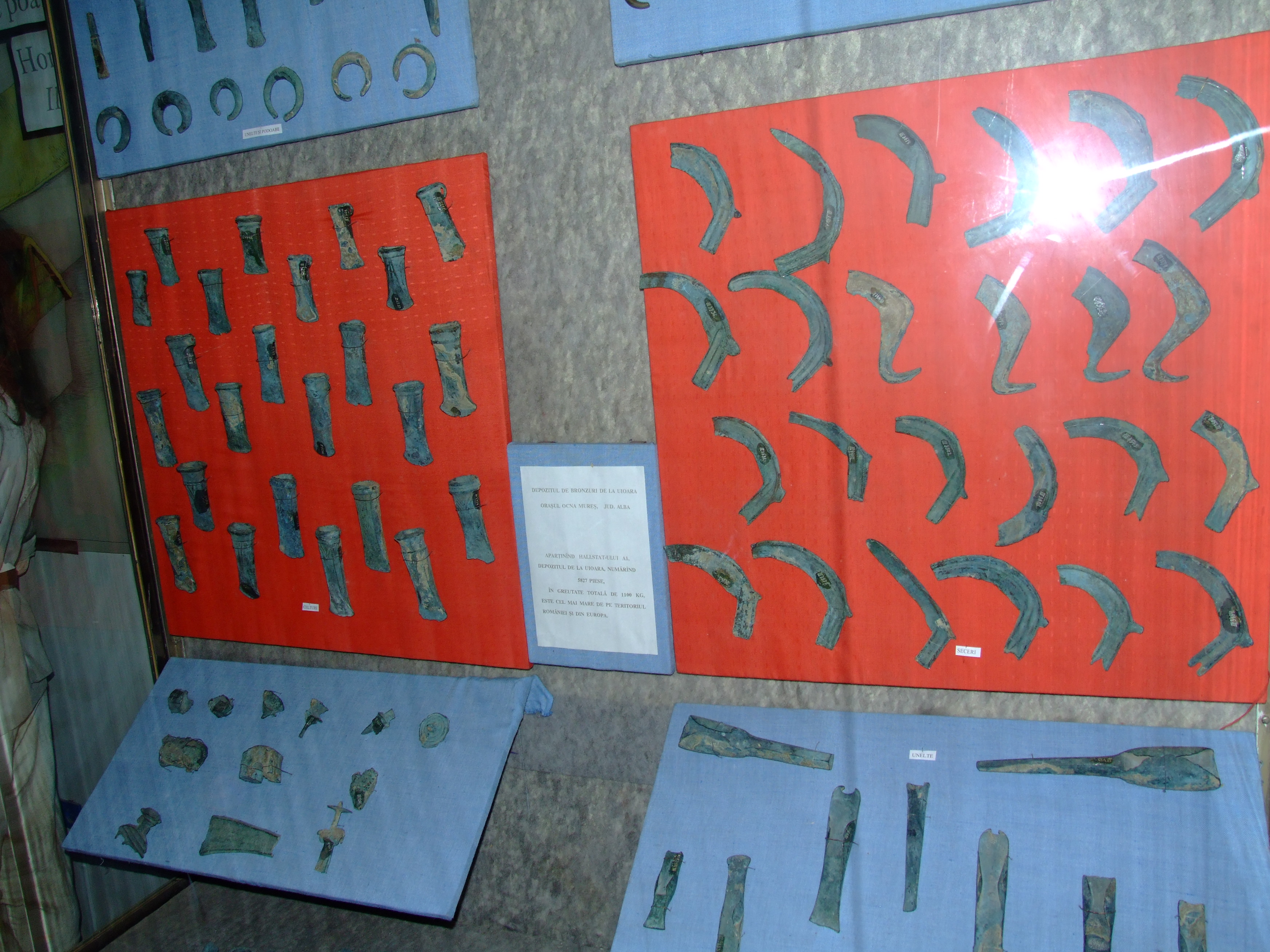
Hallstatt A1 culture artefacts from Uioara de Sus, accidentally found in 1909. The hoard contains 5,827 items weighing approximately 1,100 kg (2,400 lb)

The multiplication of the offensive, in contrast to the defensive, fighting equipment (swords type Boiu – Sauerbrunn, battle axes with spiked disc, daggers, spearheads, arm bracers, all made of bronze), the development of settlements with man-made defenses, the existence of distinct warrior graves, gives the impression that the Bronze Age was a warring world. But there are numerous arguments that it was really a matter of parading rather than using force.

The extraordinary non-ferrous mineral wealth of the Intra-Carpathian region has often been remarked upon in the literature. The overwhelming number of finds of copper, bronze, silver, and gold products is hard to equal in prehistoric Europe. For instance, no other limited prehistoric space is known to have contained two large deposits dating from the same short range of time (Hallstatt A1). Uioara de Sus, accidentally found in 1909, contained 5,827 items weighing approximately 1,100 kg, while Şpalnaca II 1,000 paces away, in the year 1887, totaling a weight of 1,000 – 1,200 kg, was composed similarly of thousands of items. In addition to Șpalnaca I, Șpalnaca II, a deposit dated Hallstatt B1, was discovered a short distance away in the year 1881 and consisted of 120 bronze items.

The local copper ores often occur together with gold and silver. The gold must have been obtained, both by the washing gravel method in the valleys rich with such ores, as well as through mining the gold ore on the surface, or in shallow veins in ravines or landslides. There is no doubt that the tools and procedures of washing gold-bearing gravel did not differ greatly from those used throughout the ages up to the beginning of the 20th century. A wooden shovel, a vat (a similar clay item was found in one of the tumuli at Lăpuș), a screen, a piece of woolen linen or even a sheep's fleece sufficed. The output was a few grams per day per worker.

== Iron Age ==
(1100 BC – 150 AD)

The First Iron Age period, also called the Hallstatt (after the finds in the locality of Hallstatt, Austria) covers the 10th to 5th centuries BC (1000–400 BC) and is divided into three periods: early (1000–700 BC), middle (700–600 BC) and late (600–400 BC). The Second Iron Age, also called La Tène, generally covers the period between 450 BC and the peak of Roman Empire.

The defining phenomenon of the epoch is the use of iron with a paramount impact on humanity's subsequent evolution.

=== Getae and Dacians (two separate ethnic groups) ===
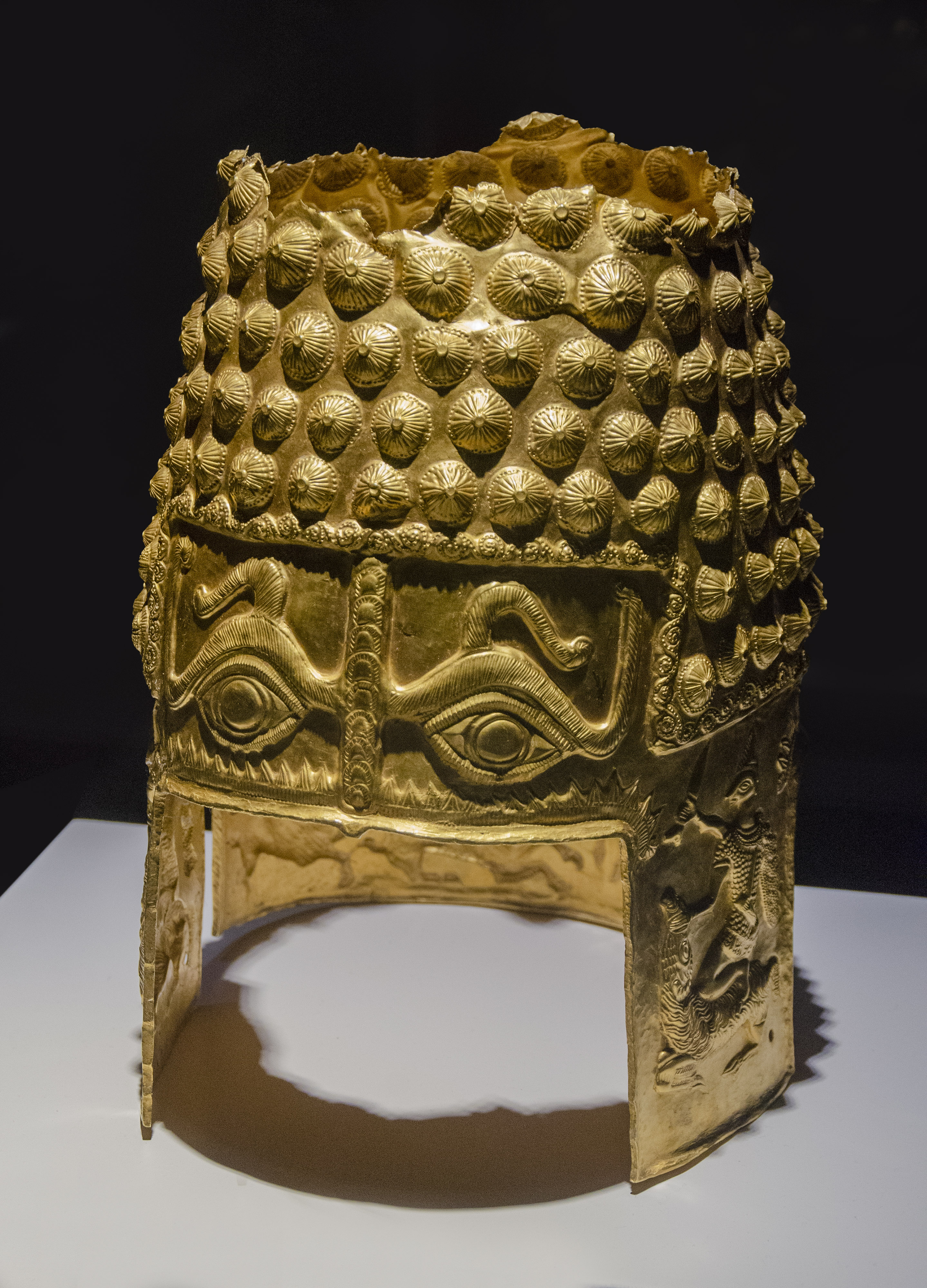
The Helmet of Coțofenești – a full gold Geto-Dacian helmet dating from the first half of the 4th century BC, currently at the National Museum of Romanian History

In contrast to the heterogeneity of the preceding ages, the first Iron Age is remarkable for its homogeneity, which is the result of the emergence and generalization of a new culture displaying black ceramics ornamented with grooves. This cultural homogenization in the First Iron Age represents essentially the material proof of the constitution within the Carpathian Danubian space of the early Geto-Dacians, who are culturally distinguishable from the southern Thracians and the other neighboring peoples. We are told this by the father of history himself—Herodotus. Recounting the Persian king Darius' expedition to the mouth of the Danube in 514 BC he mentions the Getae, praising them for their valour.

Over 600 sites are known so far across the territory of Transylvania from the First Iron Age. Most sites were occupied during all stages of this epoch. Twenty-six fortifications, some inhabited permanently, others used for refuge and defense in times of peril, are among the more remarkable.

The fortified settlements and the refuge fortifications were usually located on inaccessible elevations and close to water courses and fertile areas. Their sizes vary with the location and its possibilities. For instance, the fortified settlement at Sântana (Arad County) with an area of approximately 100 hectares or those at Ciceu-Corabia (Bistrița-Năsăud County) and Teleac (Alba County), each measuring 30 hectares, count among the largest in Europe. The first Iron Age fortifications are also known in the county of Cluj, in Dej, Huedin and Someşul Rece.

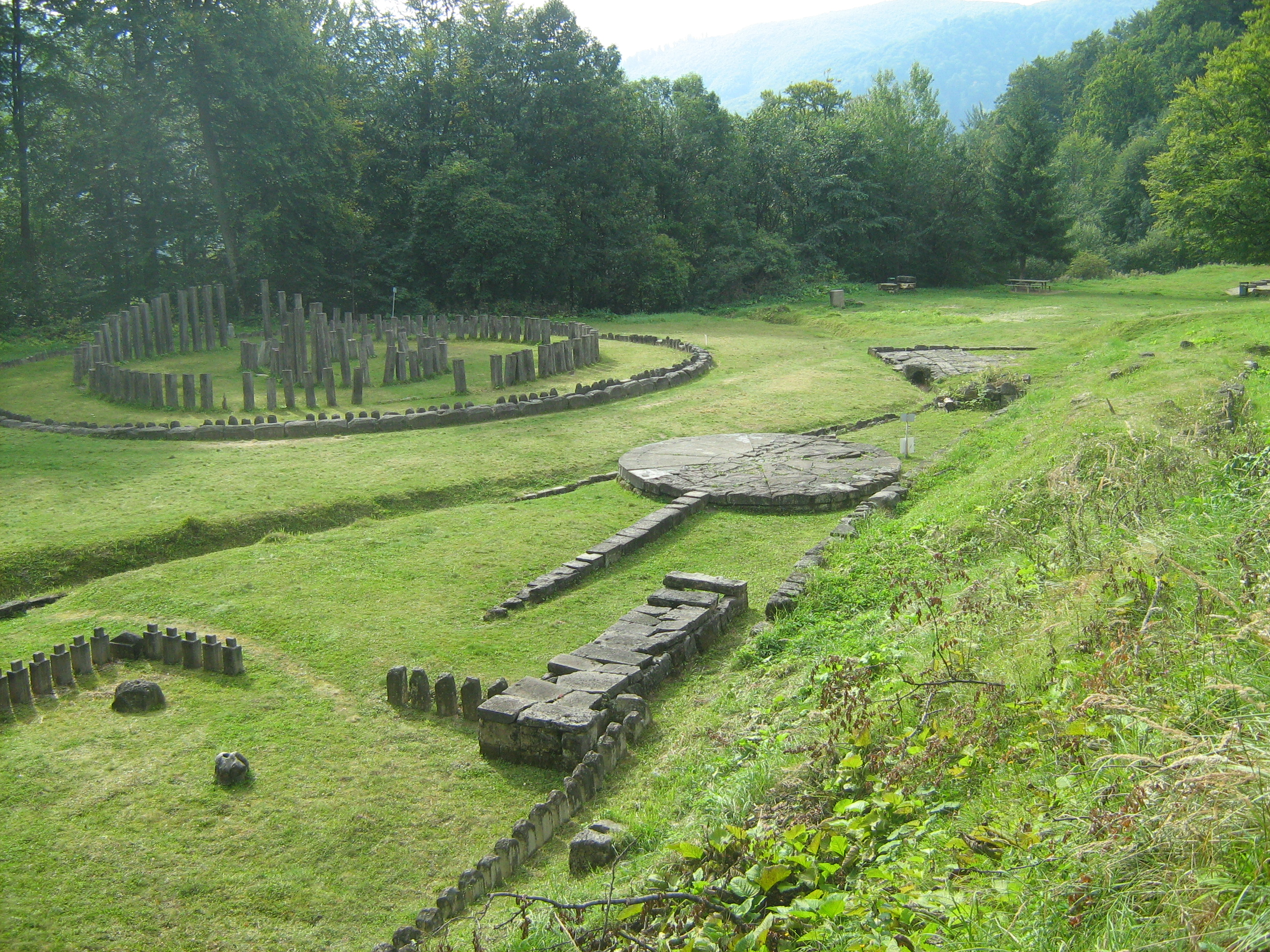
The sanctuaries at Sarmizegetusa Regia, the capital of ancient Dacia

The defense systems surrounding these regular strongholds consisted of a ditch, rampart and palisade, the last of which was designed as a wooden wall erected on the ridge of the rampart representing the most important part of the system. So designed, the fortifications generally measured 7–8 m in height, but could reach 10–12 making them difficult to conquer.

As tribal centers, the fortified settlements had multiple functions, the foremost of which was to ensure the defense of the community. The discovery of metallurgical workshops for manufacturing tools indicates that the settlements housed skilled craft activities, which included permanent exchange relations.

Agriculture was still the main pursuit in the First Iron Age and supplied food for the communities. Finding charred seeds indicates the cultivation of wheat, barley, rye, millet, as well hemp for linen, while the large size pots and the storage pits indicate how the harvests were preserved. The emergence of the first iron farming implements, scythes and grubbing hoes, indicate notable progress in the agricultural practice.

The large quantity of bones discovered in the settlements, most originating from domestic animals, cattle, sheep, swine—as well as game—indicate the importance of domestic animals to supplement hunting, as well as the importance of meat in the daily diet.

Finally, besides some such crafts as metallurgy which imply special skill, members of every family engaged in a series of activities such as weaving, spinning, and leather dressing, shown by the discovery in the dwellings of spindle, spools, sewing needles, and scrapers for cleaning hide.

The occurrence of decorations on a large number of vessels, the most perishable of categories, as well as on numerous body ornaments (hair pins, fibulae and others) shows that in the First Iron Age the artistic phenomenon was manifested especially in decorative art as geometric patterns.

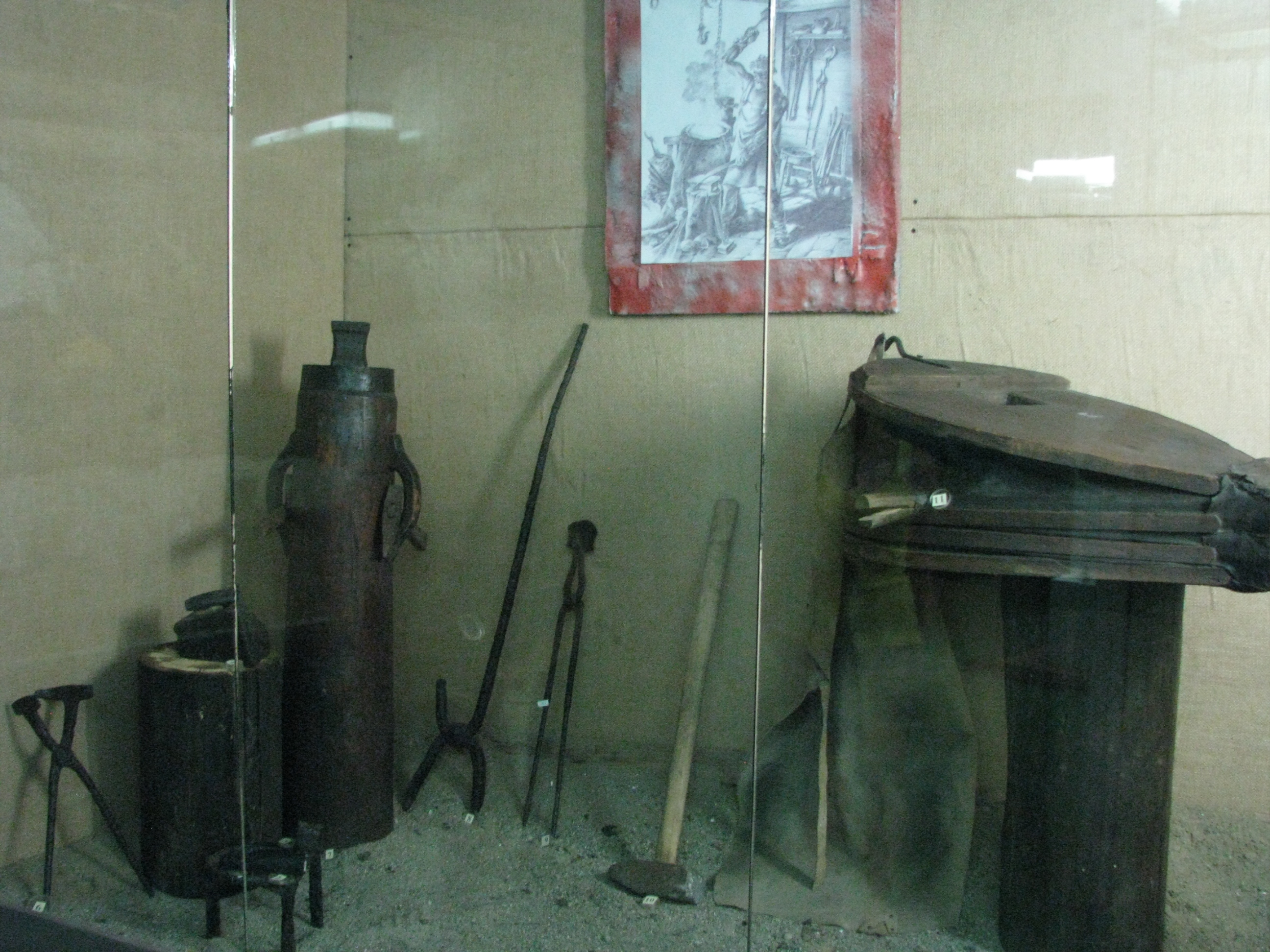
Dacian blacksmith workshop including tongs, sledgehammer, bellows, anvil. In display at the Orăștie Ethnography Museum, Orăștie

Religion was demonstrably a daily presence in prehistoric communities. Thus, besides the magic practice and the fertility cult of ancient tradition, the depositing of offerings in appropriate ground holes, as well as the representations linked to the Sun cult, foreshadow the two components: chtonian and Urano-solar to become the characteristics of the Geto-Dacian religion in the classical period.

During the First Iron Age, the local culture was influenced by neighboring areas. Midway through the epoch, on the middle course of the Mureș there arrived from Banat elements of a culture called Basarabi. Displaying ceramics with specific decorations (incised and impressed), the culture was assimilated by the autochthonous background.

Subsequently, at the beginning of the late period of this epoch (6th century BC), a group of Scythian-Iranian extraction came into Transylvania from the direction of the North-Pontic. This group is marked by a series of inhumation graves with a typical inventory: arrow heads, lances called akinakai, and animal art representations. Research shows that in about the mid-5th century BC this group disappears through assimilation into the local culture. Actually, the end of the century also delimits the First Iron Age. During the following centuries the Geto-Dacians would attain a level of development that would lead them to form a state.

== See also ==
- Ancient history of Transylvania
- Bronze Age in Romania
- Celts in Transylvania
- Dacia
- History of Romania
- History of Transylvania
- La Tène culture
- List of cities in Thrace and Dacia
- List of tribes in Thrace and Dacia
- National Museum of Transylvanian History
- Prehistory of Europe
- Prehistory of Romania
- Rotbav Archaeological Site
