= Microlites =

Microlites are minute crystals in an amorphous matrix. In igneous petrology, the term microlitic is used to describe vitric (glassy, non-crystalline, amorphous) matrix containing microscopic crystals. Microlitic rocks are a type of hypocrystalline rocks. Unlike ordinary phenocrysts, which can be seen with little or no magnification, microlites are generally formed in rapidly cooled (quenched) basaltic lava, where cooling rates are too high to permit formation of larger crystals.

Microlites are sometimes referred to as “small quench crystals”. They form more easily in basaltic lava eruptions, which have relatively low viscosity. Low viscosity permits rapid nucleation and ion migration, necessary for crystal formation. The high silica content of rhyolitic lavas gives them much higher viscosities. Such lavas tend to form glass (obsidian) when they cool rapidly from a fully melted liquid state; though many obsidians also contain microlites. Low viscosity mafic magmas must be quenched very rapidly from a high temperature to form glass that is free of any crystalline content.

Microlites have been found in volcanic ash collected from Hawaiian lava fountains, where rapid cooling favors their formation. Sideromelane is a light brown basaltic glass, also formed in these eruptions, with and without microlites.
