= Săndulești =

- Commune
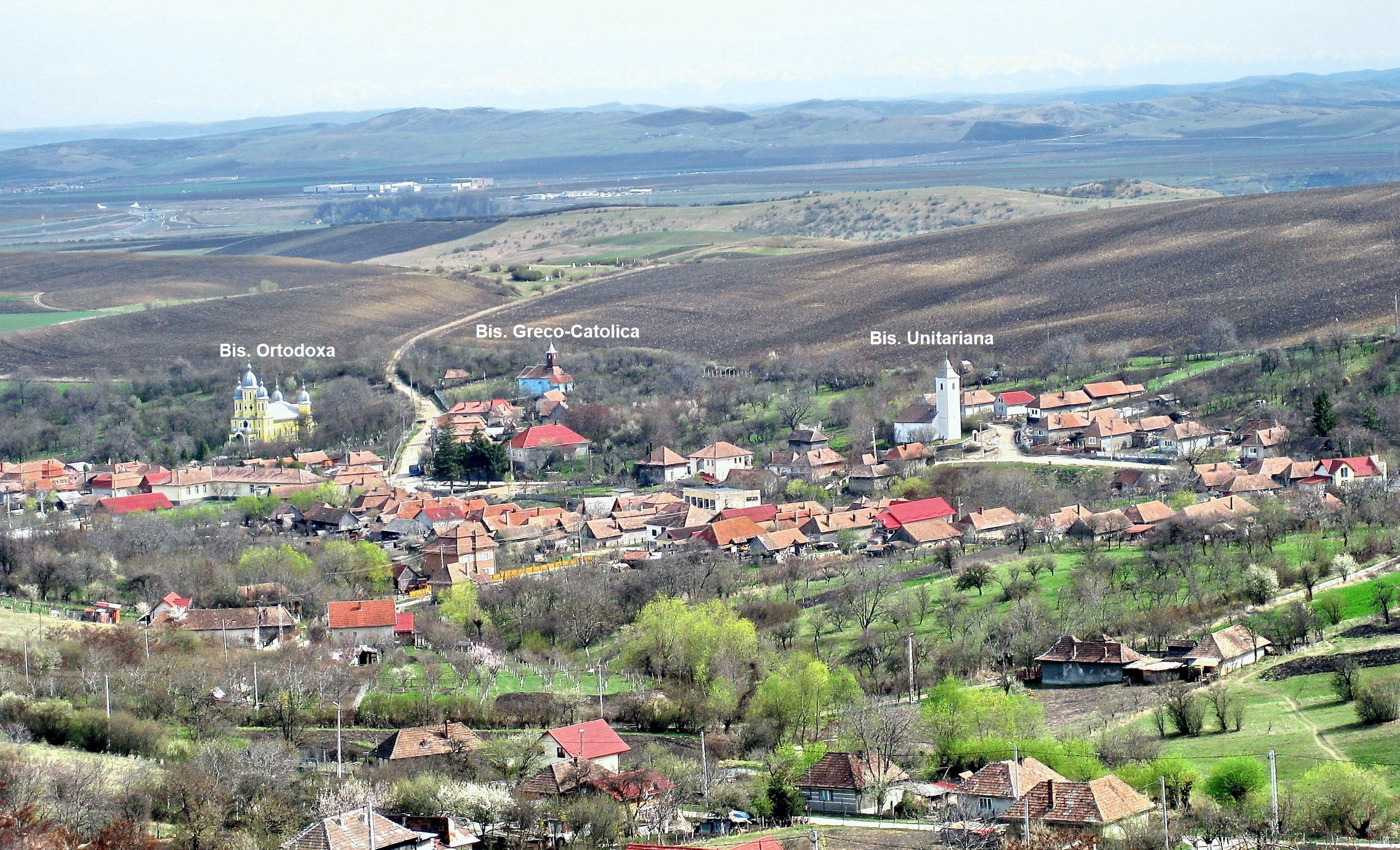
- Săndulești village

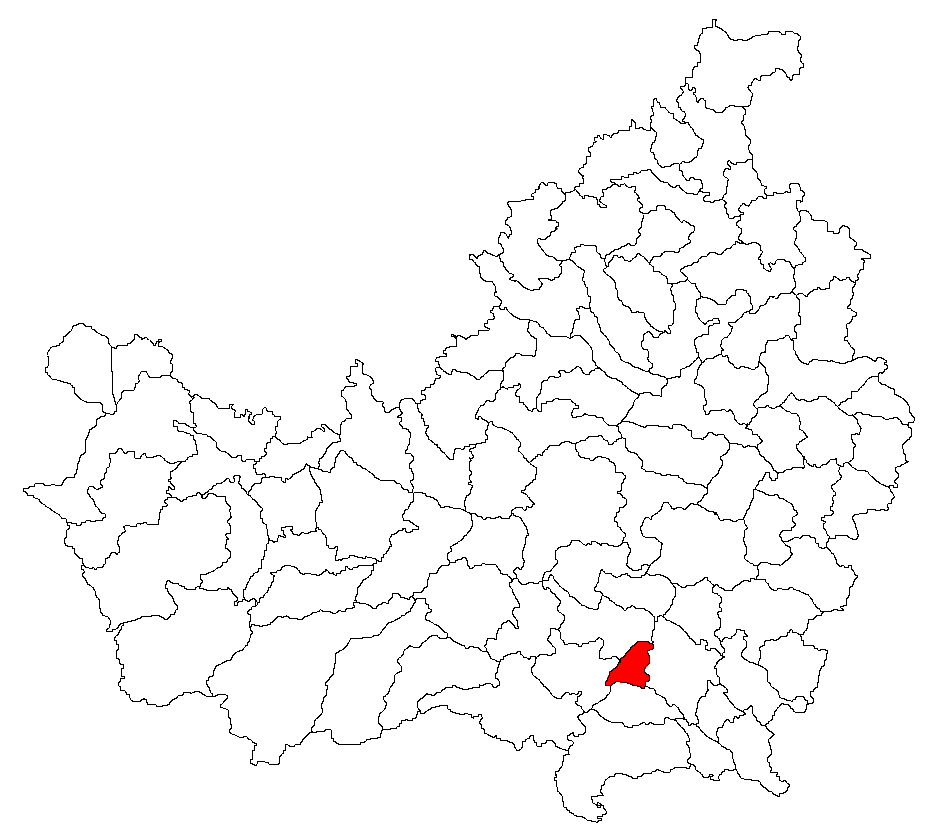
- Location in Cluj County

- Location in Romania
- Coordinates: 46°35′38″N 23°44′49″E
- Country: Romania
- County: Cluj
- Subdivisions: Copăceni, Săndulești

Government
  - Mayor (2024–2028): Călin-Stelian Fărgaciu (PNL)
- Area: 22.48 km^{2} (8.68 sq mi)
- Elevation: 454 m (1,490 ft)
- Population (2021-12-01): 1,944
  - Density: 86.48/km^{2} (224.0/sq mi)
- Time zone: UTC+02:00 (EET)
  - Summer (DST): UTC+03:00 (EEST)
- Postal code: 407500
- Area code: +(40) 0264
- Vehicle reg.: CJ
- Website: comunasandulesti.ro

Săndulești (Hungarian: Szind) is a commune in Cluj County, Transylvania, Romania. It is composed of two villages, Copăceni (Koppánd) and Săndulești.

The commune is located in the southeastern part of Cluj County, 31 km (19 mi) from the county seat, Cluj-Napoca.

== Demographics ==
Historical population
Year	Pop.	±%
1850	1,002	—
1880	1,154	+15.2%
1890	1,241	+7.5%
1900	1,275	+2.7%
1910	1,272	−0.2%
1920	1,275	+0.2%
1930	1,576	+23.6%
1941	1,887	+19.7%
1966	2,362	+25.2%
1977	2,270	−3.9%
1992	1,751	−22.9%
2002	1,892	+8.1%
2011	1,798	−5.0%
2021	1,944	+8.1%
Source: Census data

According to the census from 2002 there was a total population of 1,892 people living in this commune; of this population, 94.60% were ethnic Romanians, 4.28% ethnic Hungarians, and 1.10% ethnic Roma. At the 2021 census, Săndulești had a population of 1,944; of those, 85.91% were Romanians, 2.78% Hungarians, and 1.44% Roma.

== Personalities ==
- Mihály Bors, a leader in the Unitarian Church of Transylvania

== Tourism ==
- Fishing lake in Săndulești
- Salina Turda (salt mine)
- Turda Gorge (interesting landscape)
