= Tei culture =

Bronze age culture in Europe

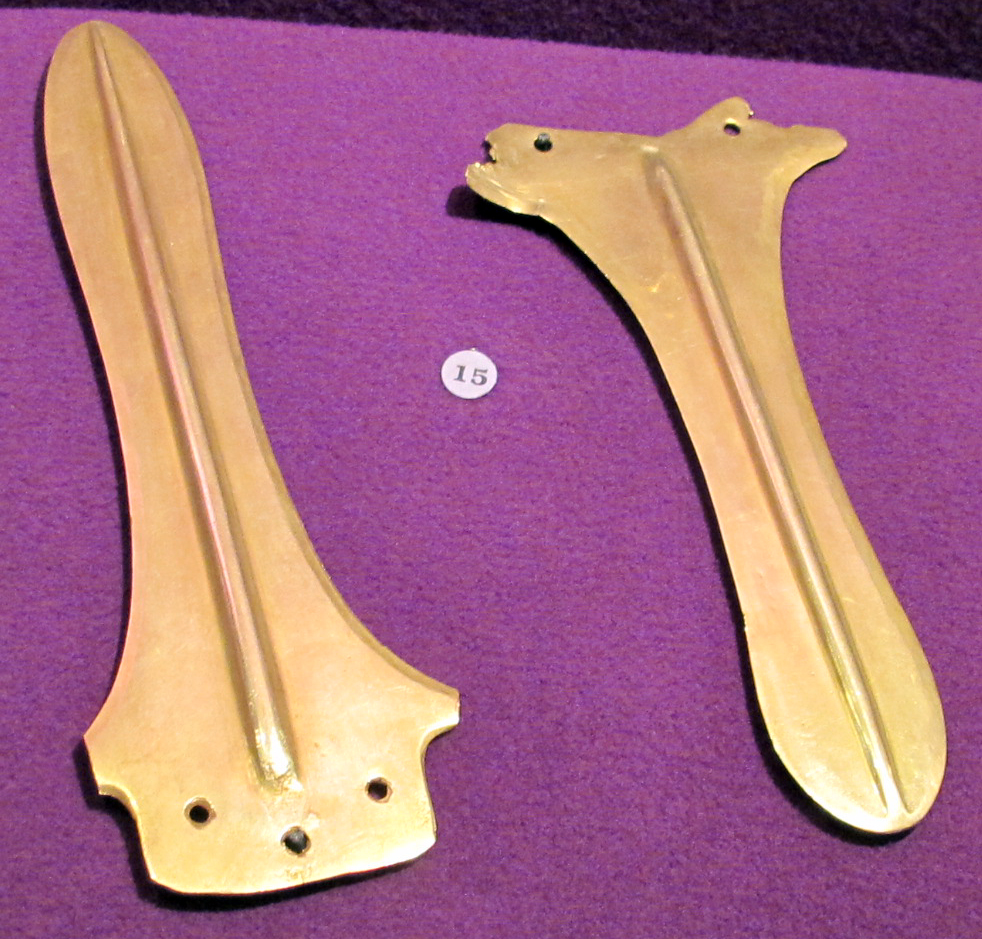
- Geographical range: Romania, Bulgaria
- Period: Bronze Age
- Dates: c. 2000 BC – 14th century BC
- Preceded by: Glina-Schneckenberg culture
- Followed by: Noua-Coslogeni culture, Wietenberg culture

The Tei culture was a Bronze Age archaeological culture located in southern Romania and northern Bulgaria, dating from c. 2000 BC to the 14th century BC. It was preceded by the Glina-Schneckenberg culture and succeeded by the Noua-Coslogeni culture, and was contemporary with the related Monteoru culture.

== Discoveries ==
A hoard consisting of eleven gold daggers, a gold 'sword-dagger', and four silver battle-axes was found in Perșinari, within the Tei cultural area, dating from the 17th to 16th centuries BC. Two similar gold daggers (or halberds) were also found nearby at Măcin, along with a pair of gold bracelets similar to bracelets from the Únětice culture. The daggers (or halberds) and sword-dagger are related in shape to contemporary specimens from Mycenaean Greece.

Gold and silver weapons are also known from other parts of Europe in the same period, such as a gold axe from Tufalau (Romania) belonging to the Wietenberg culture, a gold axe from Dieskau (Germany) belonging to the Únětice culture, a gold dagger from Inowrocław (Poland) belonging to the Iwno culture, and a gold dagger and silver axe from Mala Gruda (Montenegro) belonging to the Cetina culture or late Vučedol culture.

== Gallery ==
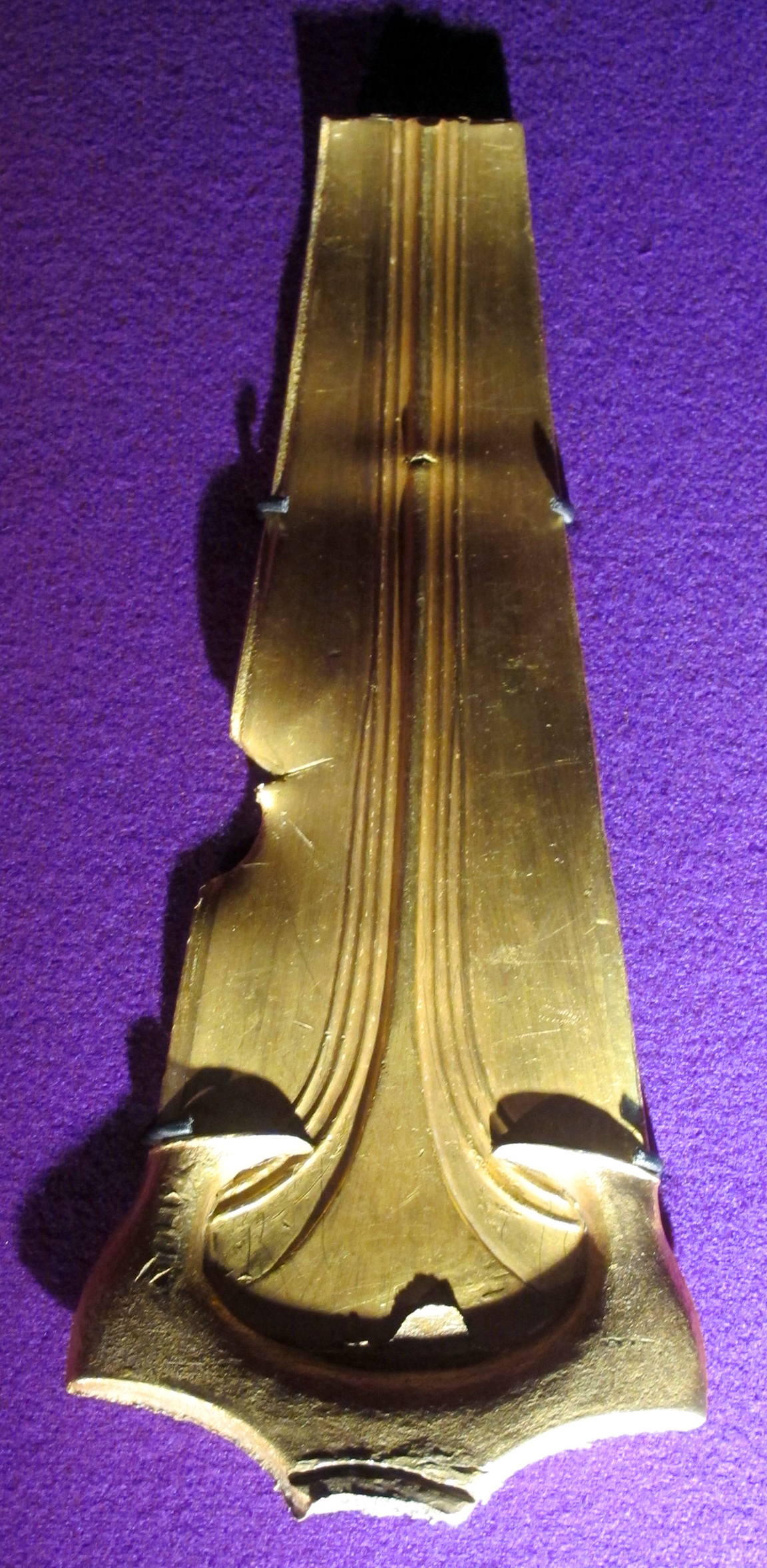
Gold sword-dagger from Perșinari

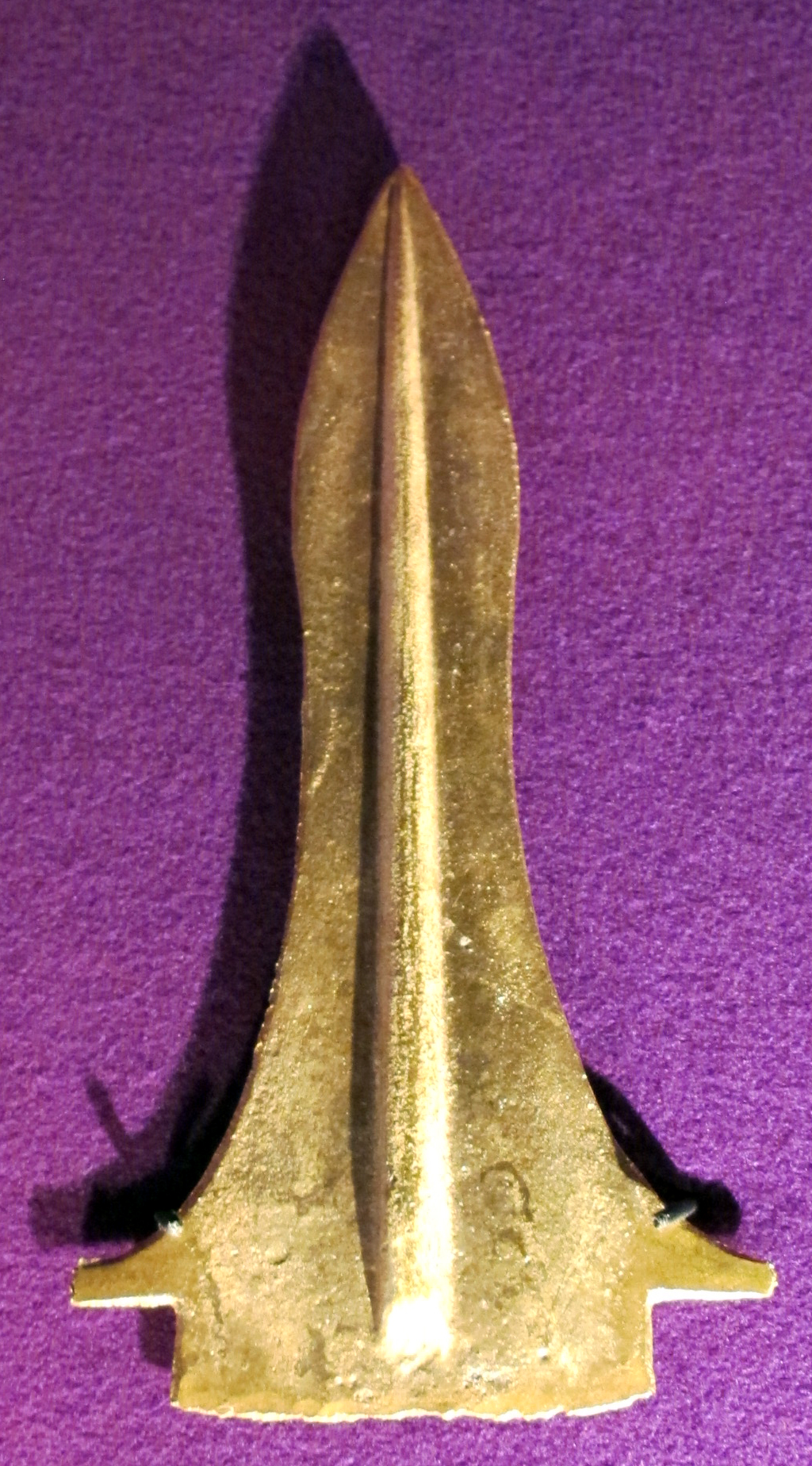
Gold dagger from Perșinari

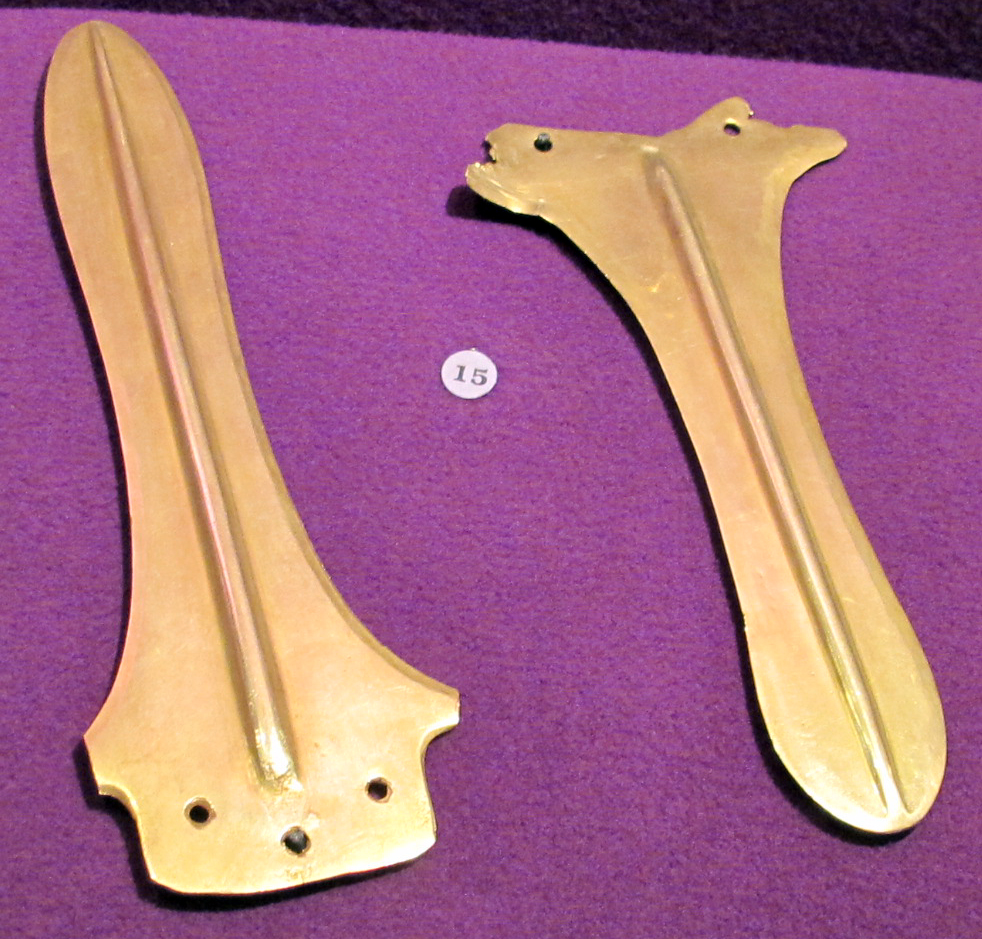
Gold daggers or halberds from Măcin

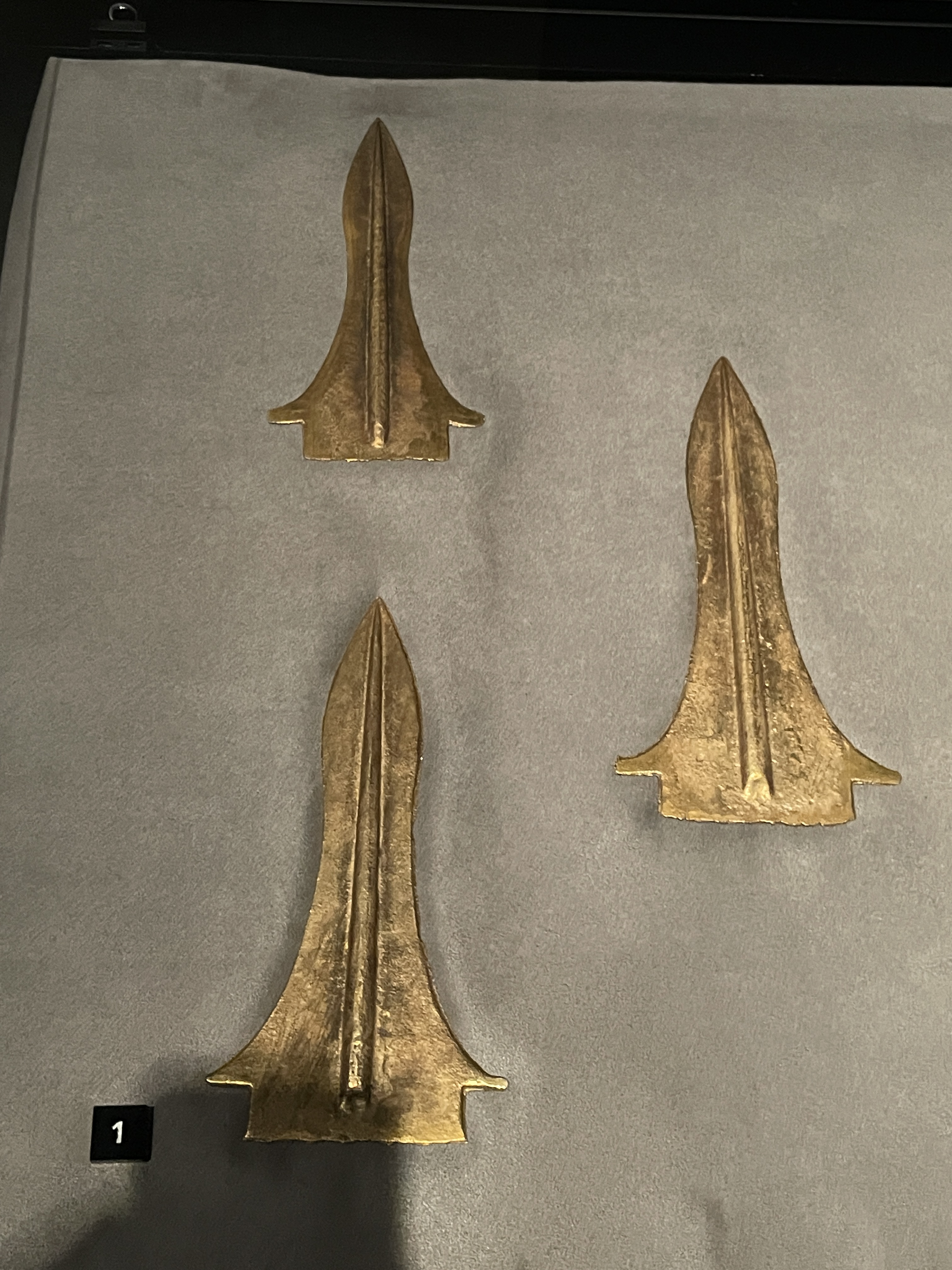
Gold daggers from Perșinari

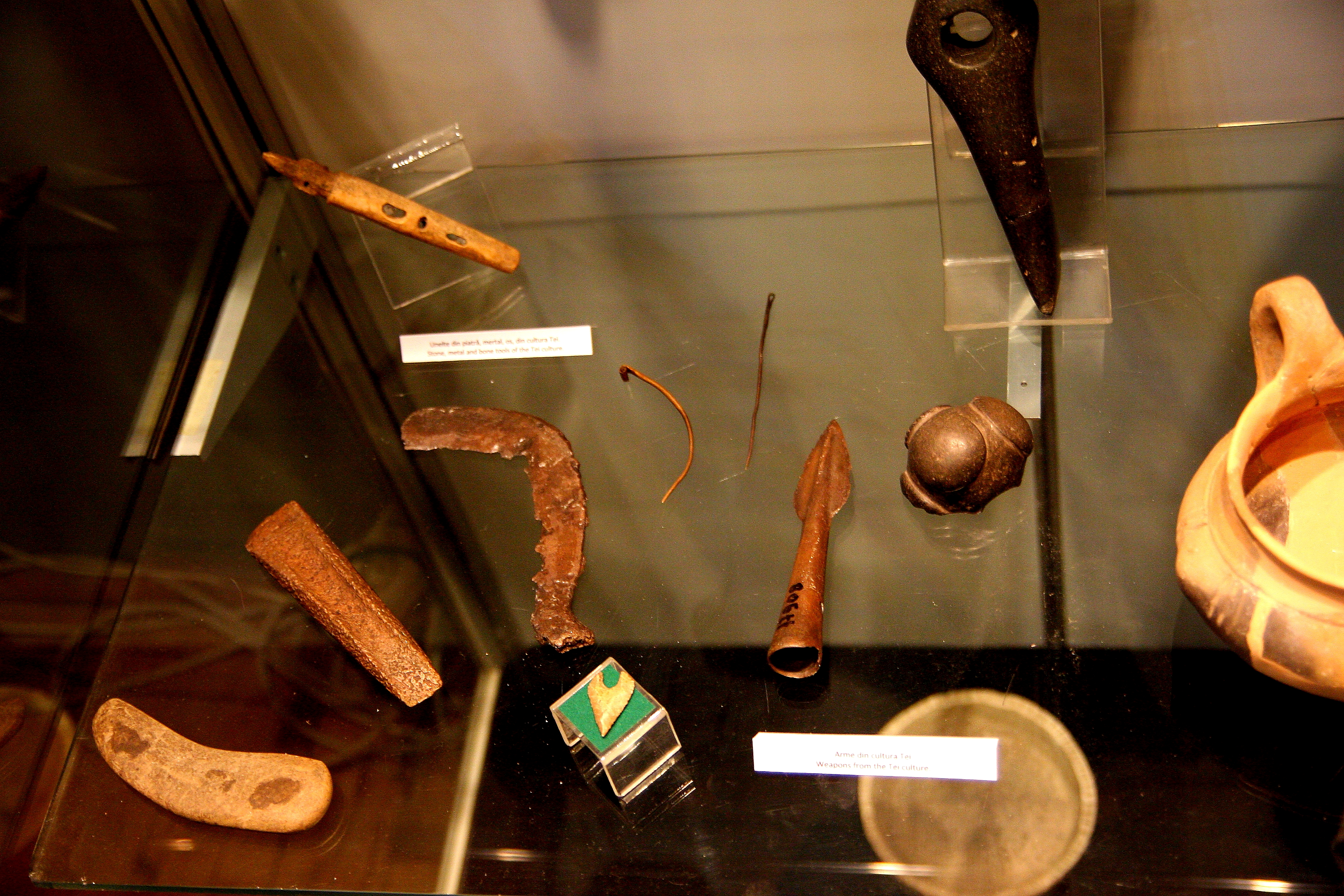
Various artefacts

== See also ==
- Ottomany culture
- Wietenberg culture
- Vatya culture
- Vatin culture
- Hatvan culture
- Monteoru culture
- Encrusted Pottery culture
- Unetice culture
- Multi-cordoned ware culture
