= Monteoru culture =

Bronze Age archaeological culture

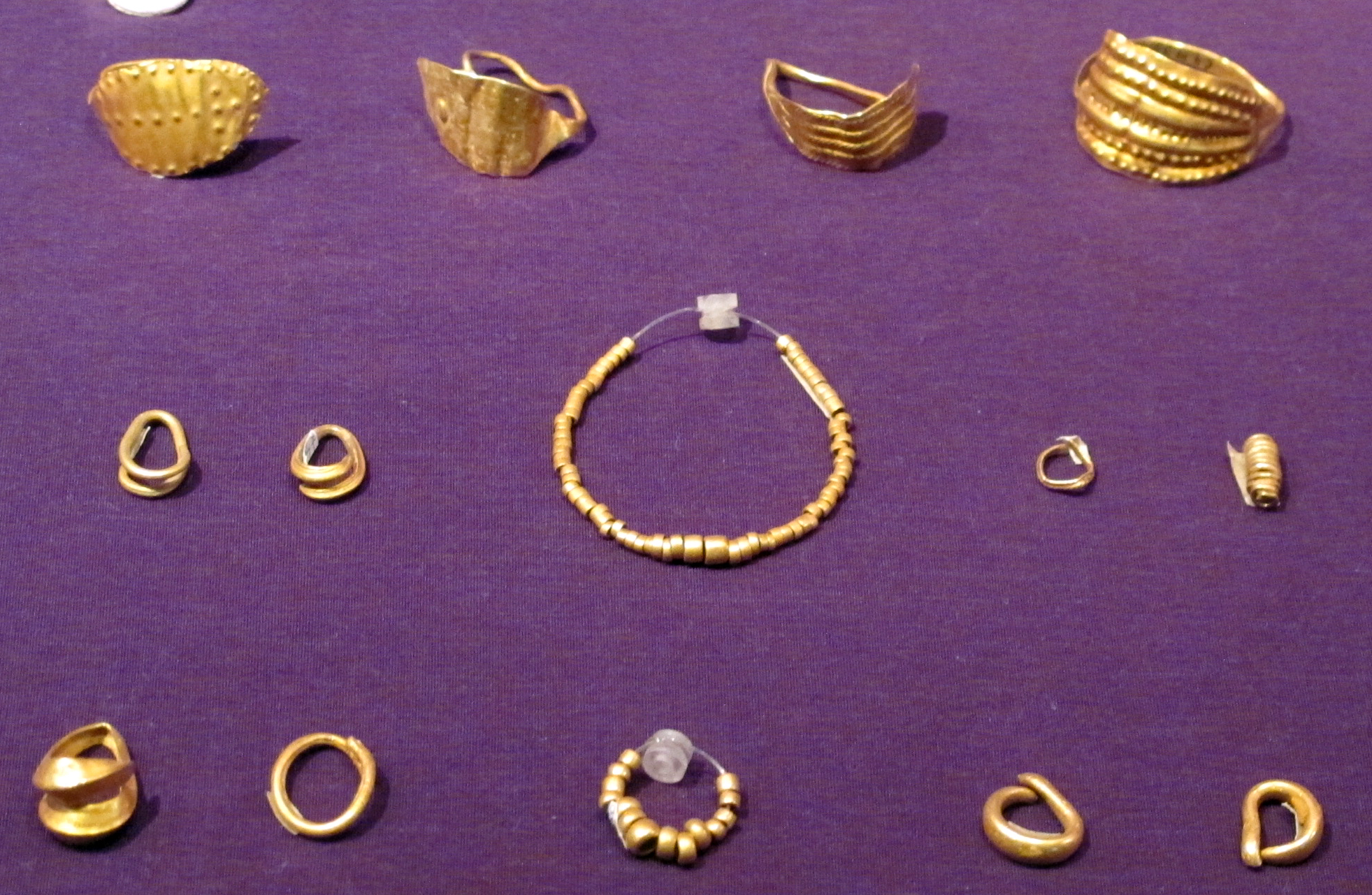
- Geographical range: Romania, Moldova
- Period: Bronze Age
- Dates: c. 2400 BC - 16th century BC
- Preceded by: Glina-Schneckenberg culture
- Followed by: Noua-Sabatinovka culture

The Monteoru culture was a Bronze Age archaeological culture located in Romania and Moldova, dating from c. 2400 BC to the 16th century BC. It was derived from the preceding Glina-Schneckenberg culture and succeeded by the Noua-Sabatinovka culture, and was contemporary with the related Tei culture. The Monteoru Culture is divided into Three main phases. IC, IB, IA and IIA. the IC Phase is further subdivided into IC4, IC3, IC2, and IC1. The Phases IC4-IC2 last approximately 2400-2250bc, and are the earliest manifestations of this Group. In this Phase, Inhumation in Stone Cist graves was Common, a trait shared with the Contemporary Naeni-Schneckengerg, Odaia Turculi and Dambotivsa Muscel Groups, whose closeness to Early Monteoru can be grouped into a broader horizon of Stone Cist Graves, dating 2400-2200bc, succeeding the Glina-Schneckenberg Culture.

According to Anthony (2007), chariotry spread westwards to the Monteoru culture from the Multi-cordoned ware culture.

== Gallery ==
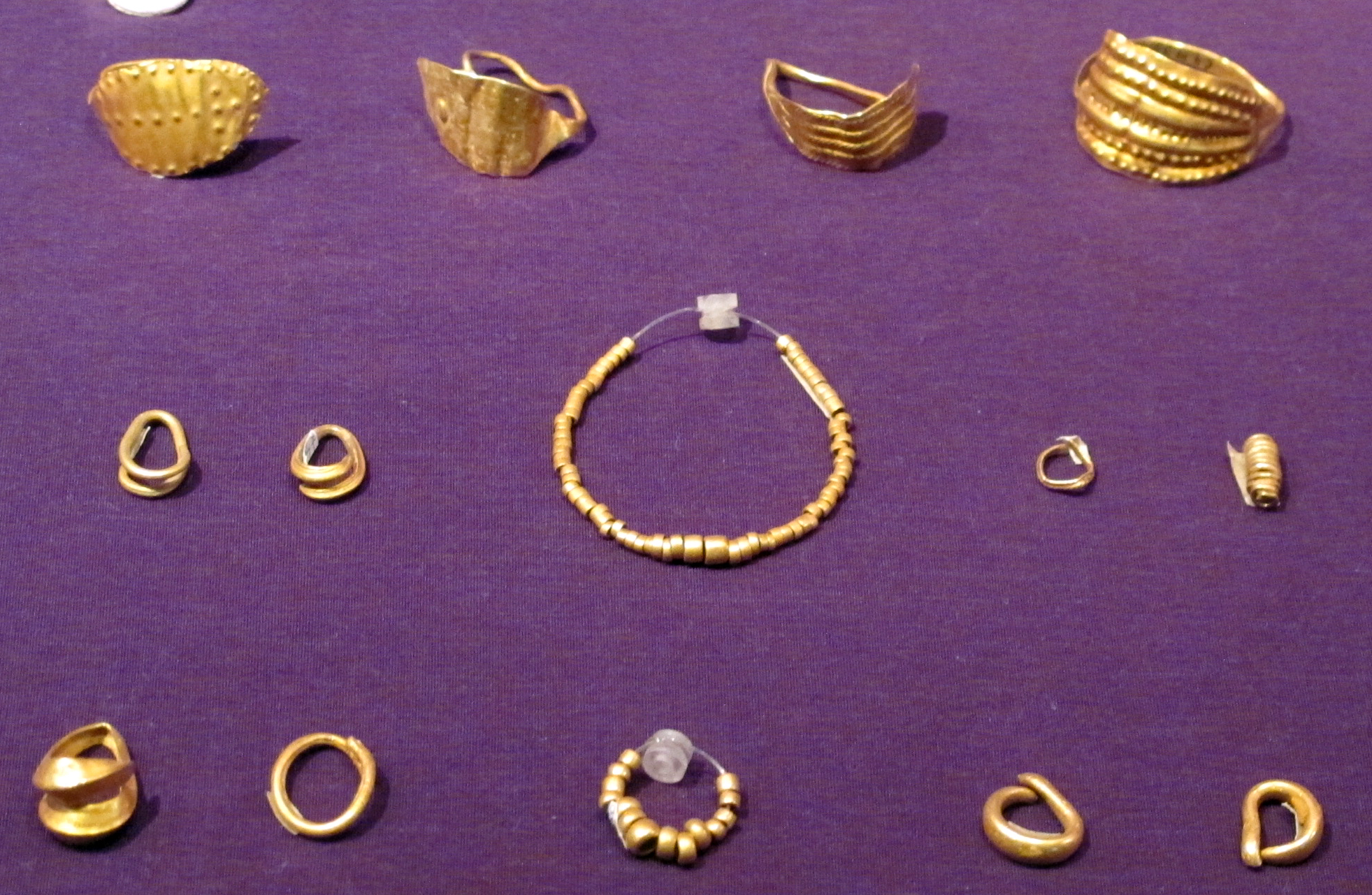
Gold jewellery, c. 1600-1400 BC

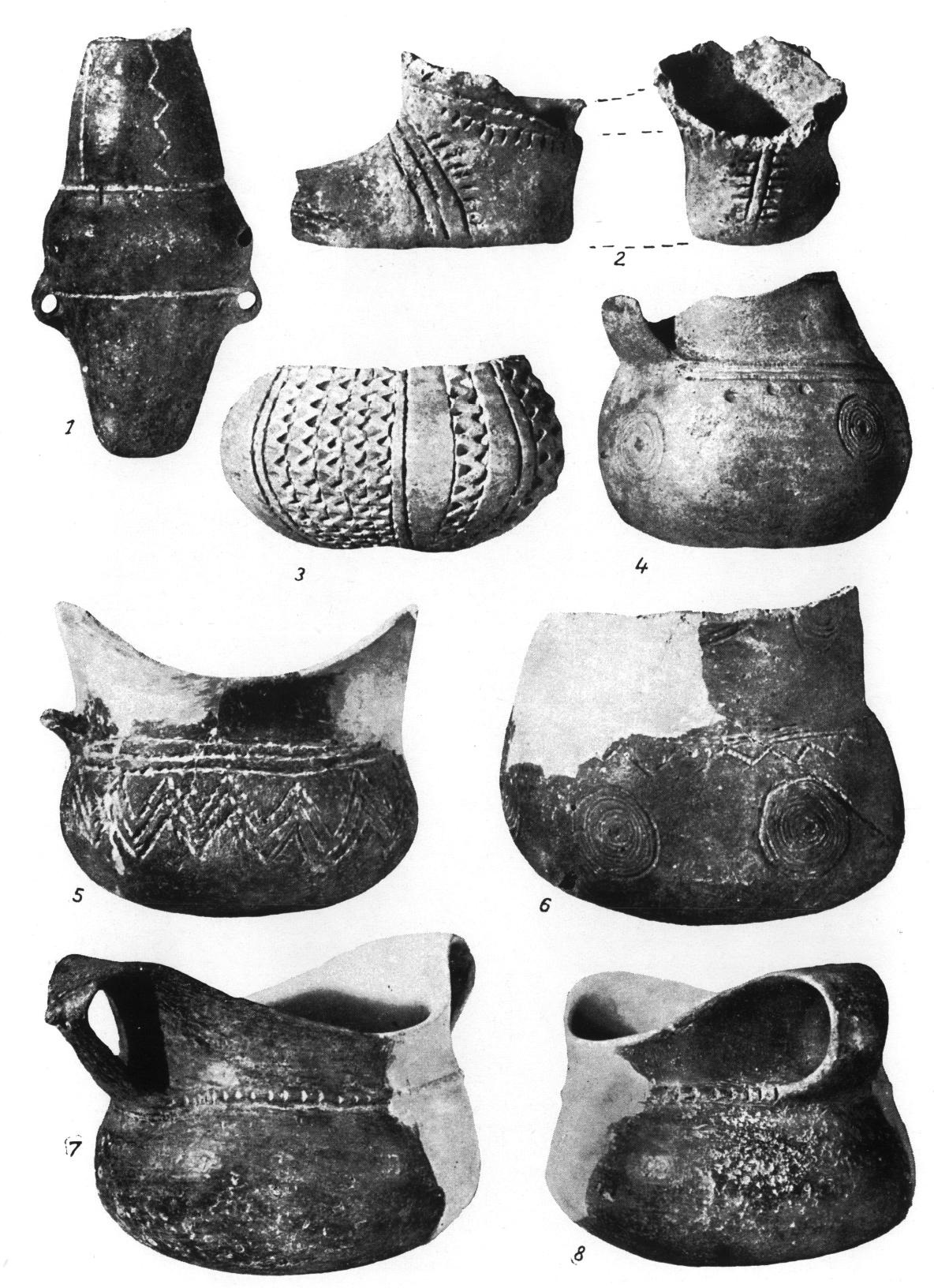
Early Monteoru pottery

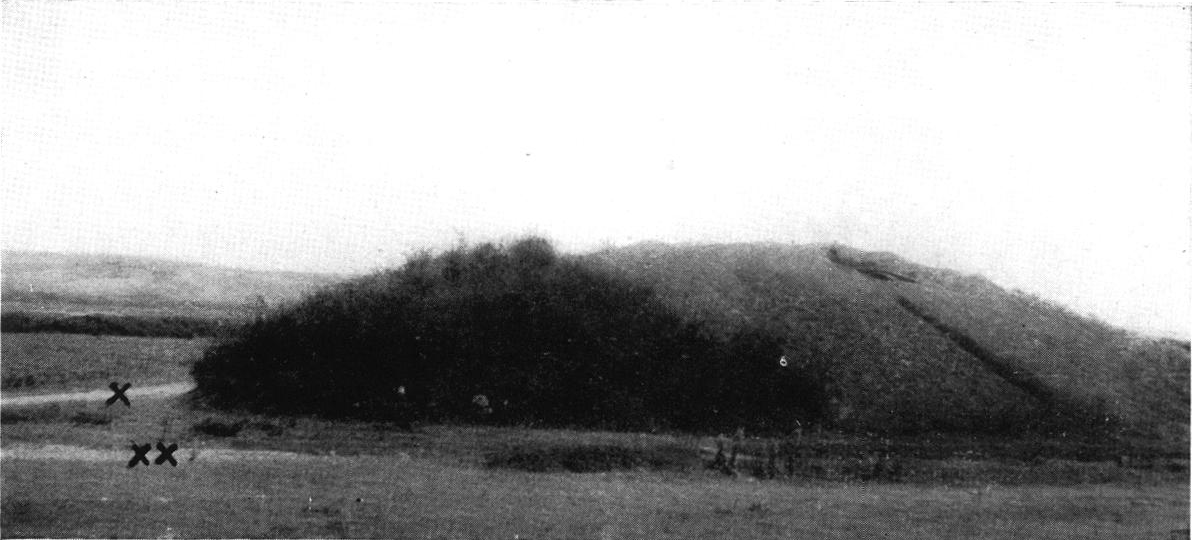
Fortified settlement site of Dealul Titelca, Romania

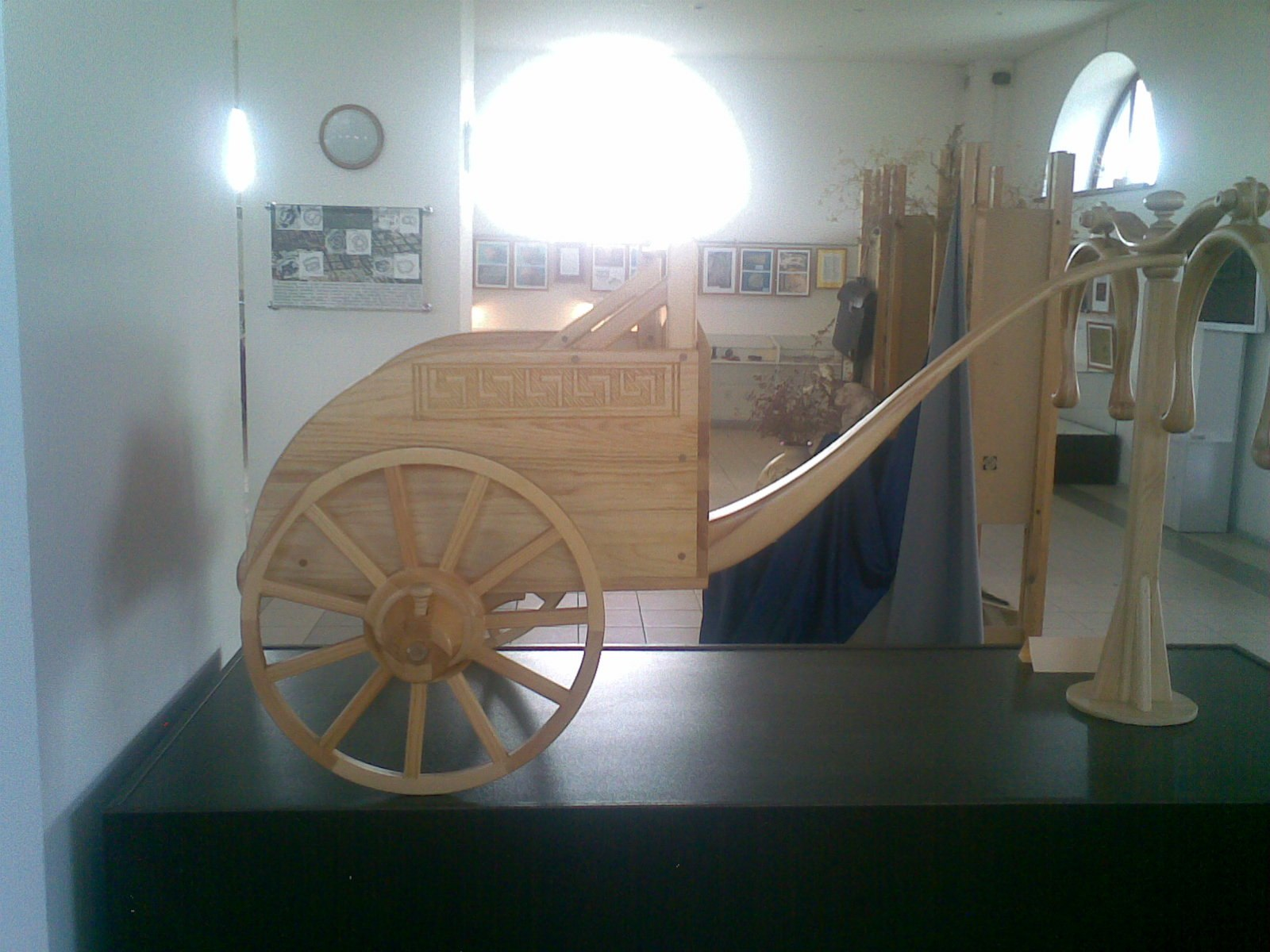
Chariot model, Arkaim museum

== Genetics ==
According to genetic studies, the Monteoru culture had male haplogroups I2a and G2a. Of the female haplogroups, the following were present: H11a2, K1c1, H1, J1c, U5a1a1, H58.

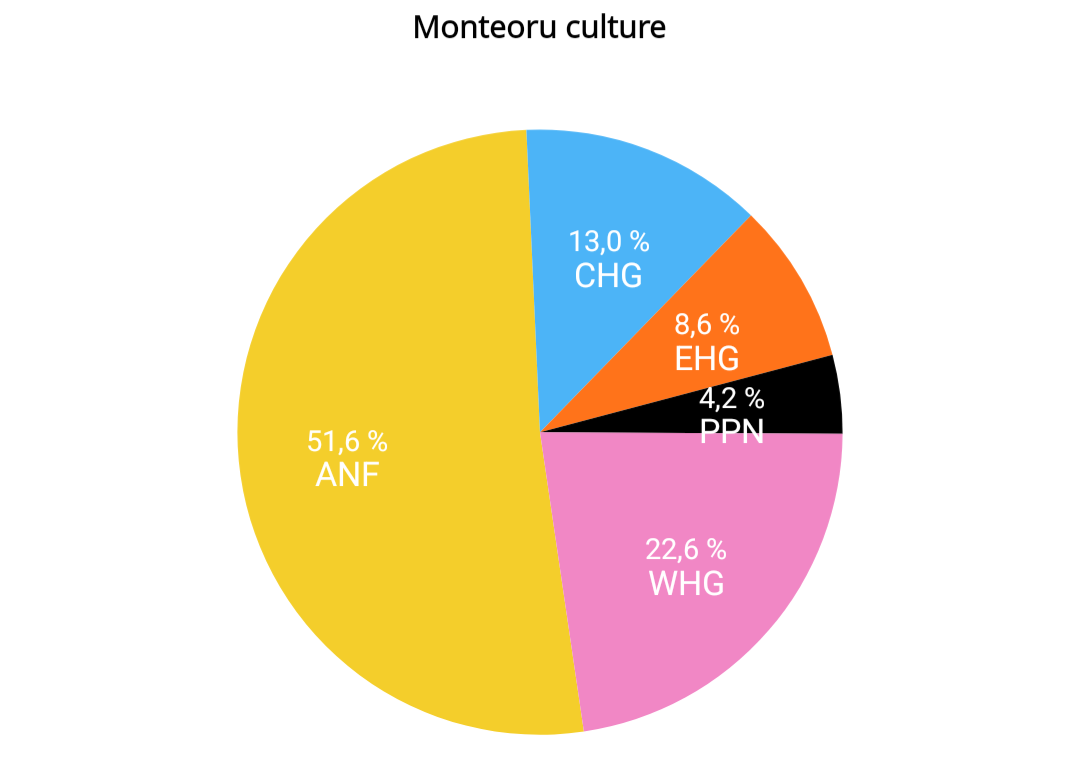
Autosomal DNA Monteoru culture

== See also ==
- Prehistory of Transylvania
- Tei culture
- Ottomany culture
- Wietenberg culture
- Vatya Culture
- Unetice culture
- Multi-cordoned ware culture
