= Bronze Age in Romania =

The Bronze Age is a period in the Prehistoric Romanian timeline and is sub-divided into Early Bronze Age (c. 3500–2200 BC), Middle Bronze Age (c. 2200–1600/1500 BC), and Late Bronze Age (c. 1600/1500–1100 BC).

== Periodization ==
Several Bronze Age chronologies have been applied to the Romanian area. An example would be the Periodization of Paul Reinecke for the Central European space, which split the Bronze Age into four phases (A, B, C and D) based upon the associations among the found bronze objects.

== Features ==
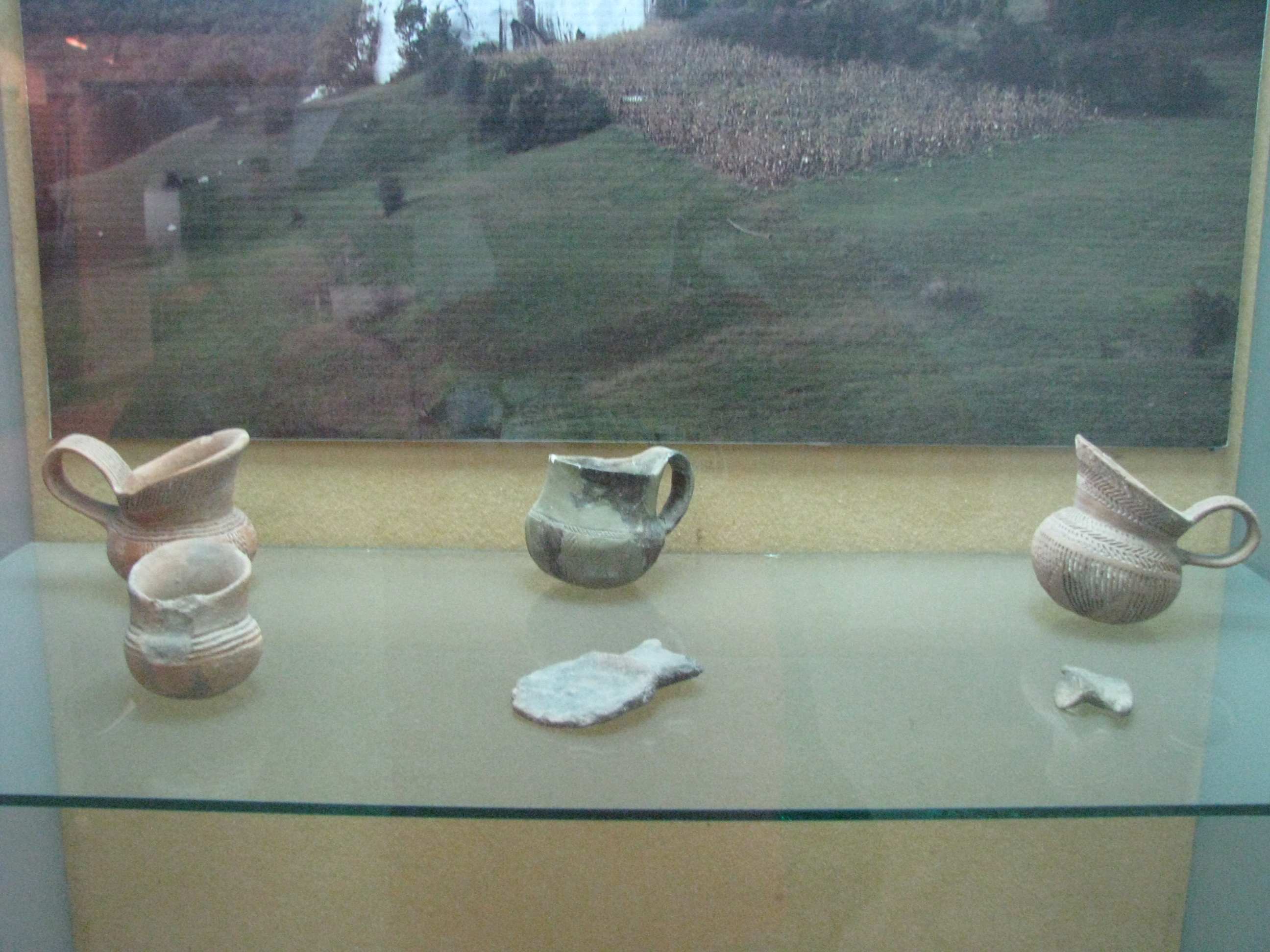
Coţofeni culture pottery at the Aiud History Museum, Aiud

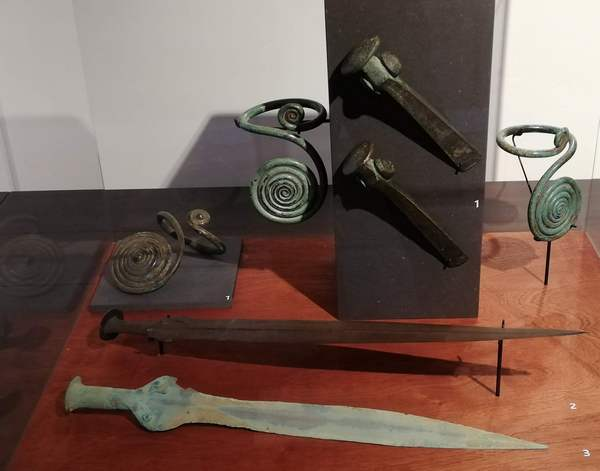
Wietenberg culture artifacts. In display at the National Museum of Transylvanian History, Cluj-Napoca

During the Bronze Age, there were some important developments from the Chalcolithic, with significant improvements in the economy.

The local bronze-aged economy was based on rearing livestock (sheep, goats and pigs). The Wietenberg culture reared large cattle and horses for both transportation and food. At this time, the artistic output also significantly increased, for example the Gârla Mare culture who created intricate clay statuettes.

In the Early Bronze Age (c. 3500–2200 BC), we see the archaeological evidence of various cultures developing, including the Baden-Coţofeni culture, the Cernavodă III-Belleraz culture, the Glina-Schneckenberg culture and the Verbicioara culture. Common occupations were agriculture, mining, and animal husbandry. Houses were rectangular and medium-sized. The last period of the Early Bronze Age produced a broad range of ornaments (loop rings, bracelets, necklaces, pendants comprising copper, gold, and silver and particularly bronze).

Verbicioara culture was identified in 1949 by the eponymous resort excavations. Regarding burial customs, it was considered the beginning of the burial of the dead.

In the Middle Bronze Age (c. 2200–1600/1500 BC), the population of Romania and neighboring countries was demarcated by the appearance of several major cultures. Some that stand out include the Otomani culture (seen also in Slovakia), Wietenberg culture (seen in Transylvania), Mureş culture, and Gârla Mare culture (from which impressive clay figurines and statuettes have been found).

== Religion ==
The Bronze Age introduced solar, or Uranian, cults. Some ornaments, considered to be solar symbols, were frequently pictured on ceramic or metal parts: concentric circles and circles accompanied by rays. Cremation is considered to be connected to these cults.

In the Romanian territory, there are three known bronze-aged sanctuaries: Sălacea, Bihor County (Ottomány culture, phase II). The only cultures of this area well represented in this regard are the Gârla Mare Zuto Brdo culture and the Bijelo Szeremle Brdo-Dalj culture (also present in Hungary and Croatia). About 340 pieces were found in the area of the two cultures, of which 244 are in the Gârla Mare area.

Clay miniature axes (axes, hammers or double axes) belonging to this period have been found. Labrys double-axes are frequently found in the Cretan and Mycenaean worlds, where they occur most often in complex rituals and tombs (for example the Tomb of double ax of Knossos). In the Mycenaean context, the labrys has a wide range of sizes, from miniature forms to giant forms that measure 1.20 meters. However, the labrys site is frequently associated with the moon and can be a symbol of a goddess of vegetation, the forerunner of Demeter, who, on Mycenaean seals, is found under a tree. The goddess has an ax in her hand and receives as gifts poppies and fruits.

== Burial Customs ==
Burial practices in Bronze Age Romania varied by region and were generally consistent within each region, however some variance could also be found in each region over time with Early Bronze Age inhumations transitioning to cremations by the Middle Bronze Age. These differences in burial practice by region can reflect differences in social structure, cultural traditions and rituals, and a societies attitude towards the dead.

=== Transylvania ===
During the Middle Bronze Age cremation accounted for 90% of known burials while inhumation occurred much less frequently. This practice was a significant change from Early Bronze Age burial practices in which inhumation was the dominant method of handling the dead. This change in mortuary practices is believed to have taken place between 2300 and 1900 BCE at a time when information on remains in the region is generally poor. Burial environments in this region are commonly flat, with the exception of a select few which were interred in previously used burial cairns.

In Central and Southwestern Transylvania many Tumulus-burials have been found and excavated starting in 1885-1887. The Tumuli, or burial mounds, in this region are generally divided into two types: Tumuli with pit graves, and Tumuli without pit graves. The former being covered in an earthen mound and the latter being covered with stone. The Tumuli without pit graves were traditionally inhumations with remains being placed on the surface and covered with dirt and stone. The Tumuli with pit graves had remains placed in the ground, sometimes in a chamber made of wood, and buried with earth.

=== Northern Romania (Suciu de Sus Culture) ===
Bronze Age northern Romania was associated with the Suciu de Sus Culture, also known as the Suciu Culture. The predominant funerary practice was cremation, with remains being placed in decorated burial urns. These urns have been discovered in burial mounds, placed directly in the ground in flat graves, and in barrow cemeteries. The decorative style of funerary urns is similar to artifacts found at ‘St. László’ in Bihor, northwest Romania.

=== Western Romania (Otomani and Mureş Cultures) ===
While there is overlap in the Western region between the Otomani and Mureş Cultures they have identifiable differences in burial practices.

The Otomani culture followed the same pattern as Transylvania with inhumations being the dominant practice in the Early Bronze Age giving way to cremation becoming as frequent by the Middle Bronze Age. The region is divided between larger cemeteries in the west, and smaller cemeteries or single burials in the east. Grave items were common including pottery, weapons and amber beads.

The Mureş cultural region is characterized by mostly flat cemetery inhumations with cremations taking place very rarely. Grave items again were common including pottery, metal, weapons and ornaments.

=== Eastern Romania (Monteoru and Costişa Cultures) ===
Monteoru culture burial practices could be characterized by the separation between inhabited areas and burial areas or Necropolises. Monteoru Necropolises are large cemeteries that were kept in use over long periods of time, located away from domestic spaces on nearby terraces or plateaus. Recent reevaluation of this region has shown this is not always a cultural rule with some graves falling within or very near to settlements (e.g., Cârlomănești–Cetățuia, Năeni–Zănoaga).

The Costişa cultural region can be distinguished by two categories of funerary practices: burials with articulated skeletal remains and scattered disarticulated remains. From recent studies archaeologists have found the scattering of disarticulated remains appears intentional. Speculation as to the origins suggested they may have come from an earlier chronological context that had been destroyed and scattered along with pottery when building over the area.

=== Southern Romania (Balta Sărată, Gârla Mare and Verbicioara Cultures) ===
The Balta Sărată cultural region has very few known cemeteries for examples of burial practices. They are predominantly urned cremations and have not been excavated.

Gârla Mare Culture had a necropolis at Cârna containing 116 cremation burials divided between an eastern and western area containing differing pottery in each area. This practice was in keeping with the standard cremation necropolis practice of the Gârla Mare Culture throughout the region.

Very few Verbicioara graves have been located or excavated leaving the funerary rites essentially unknown at this time. As there has been very little in the way of systematic archaeological excavations little can be said about a specific practice. The majority of funerary sites have been chance discoveries through surveys.

== Gallery ==
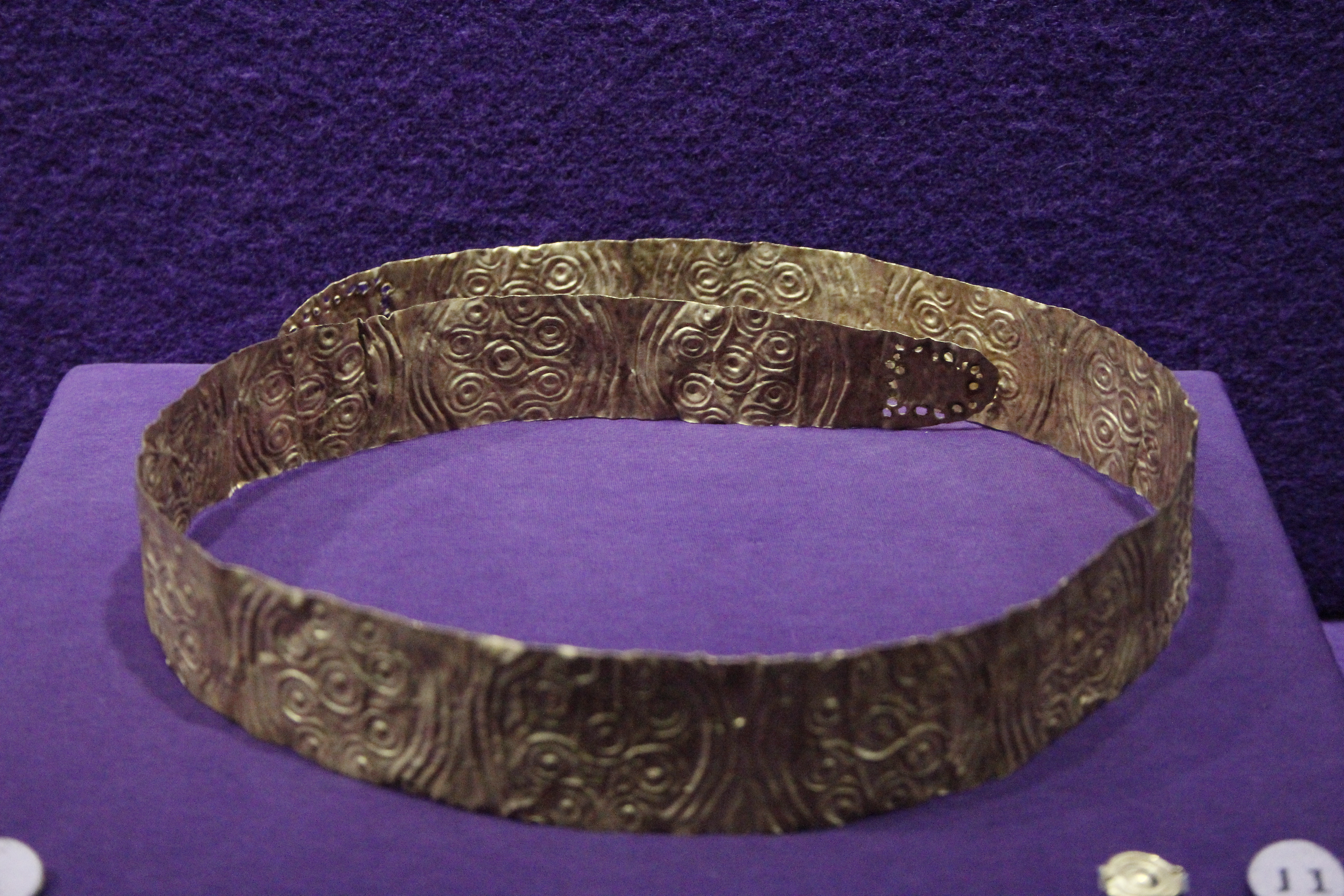

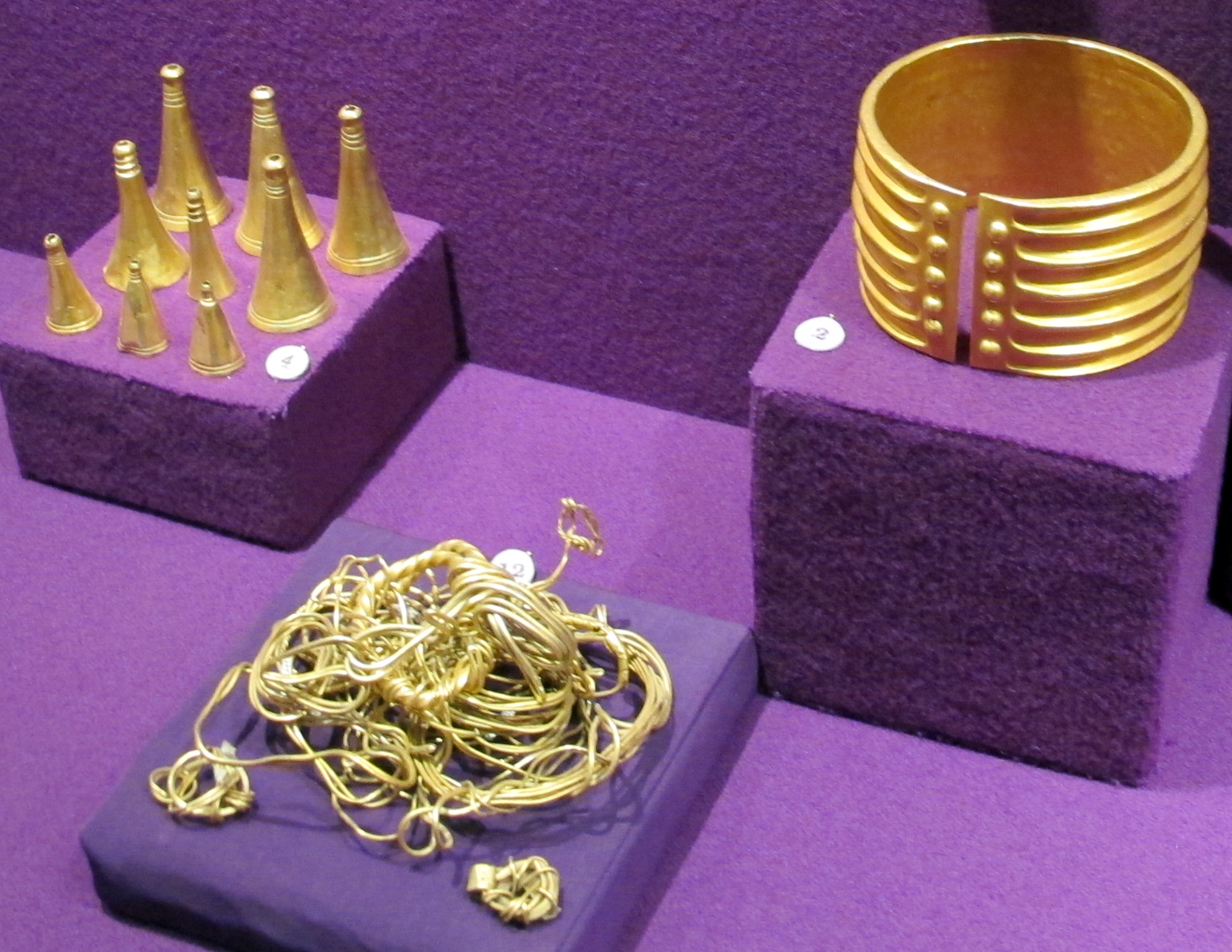

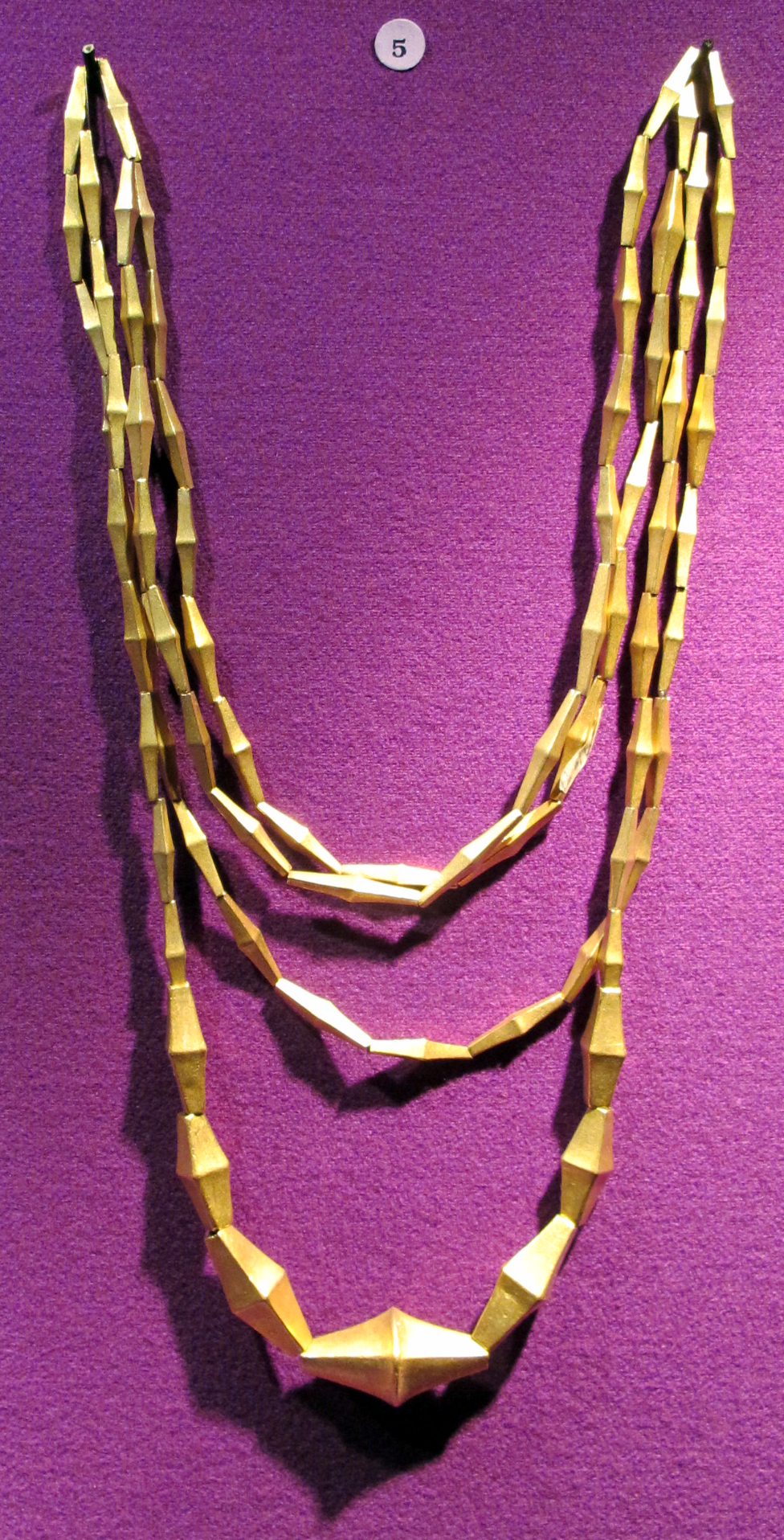

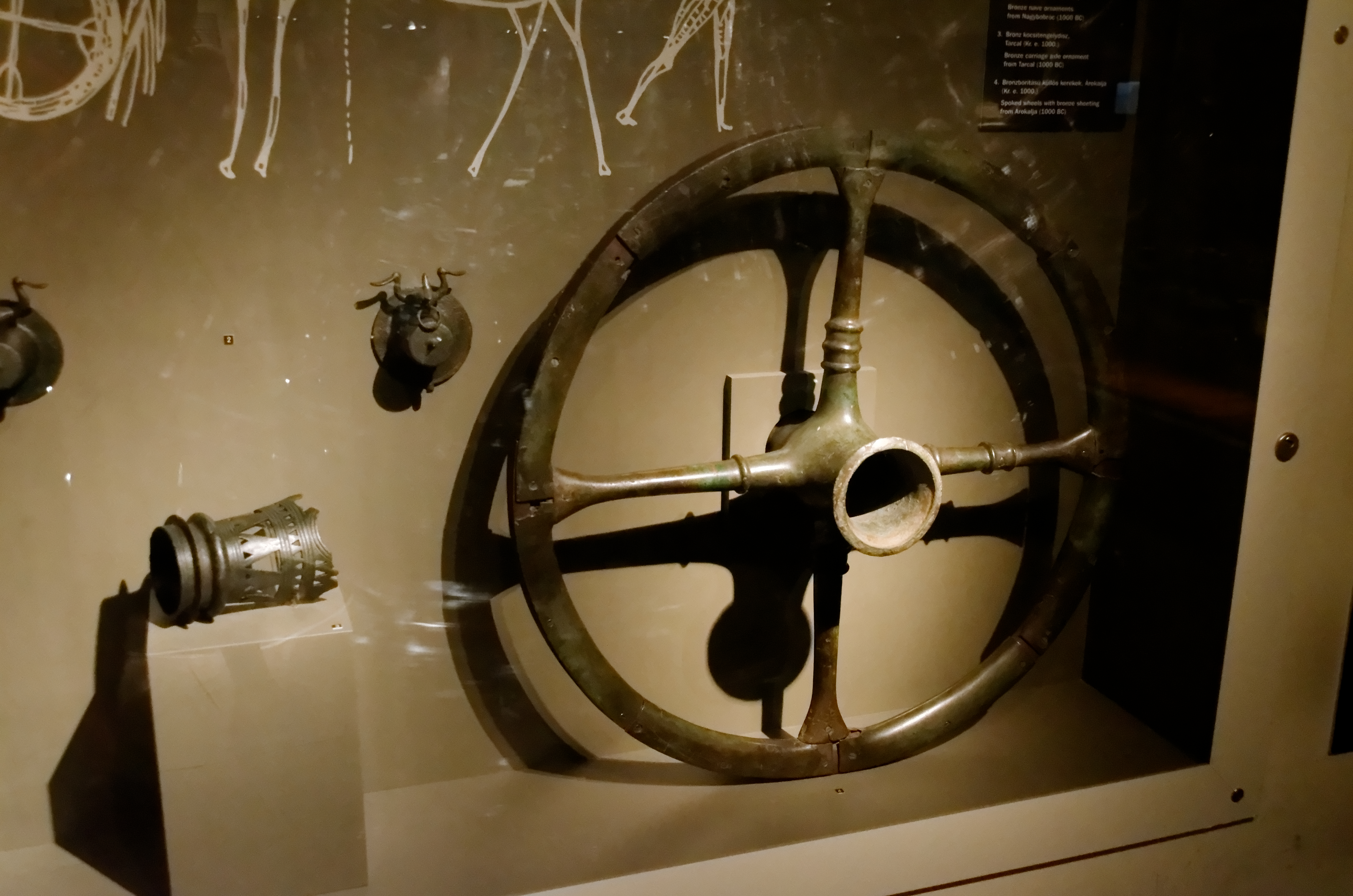

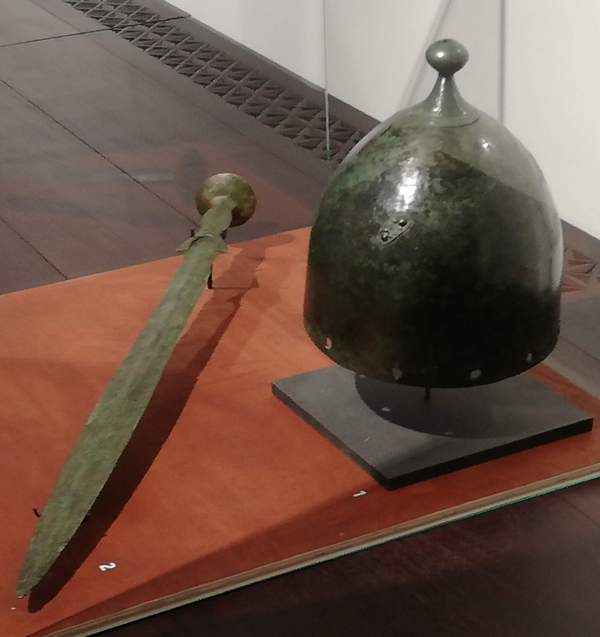

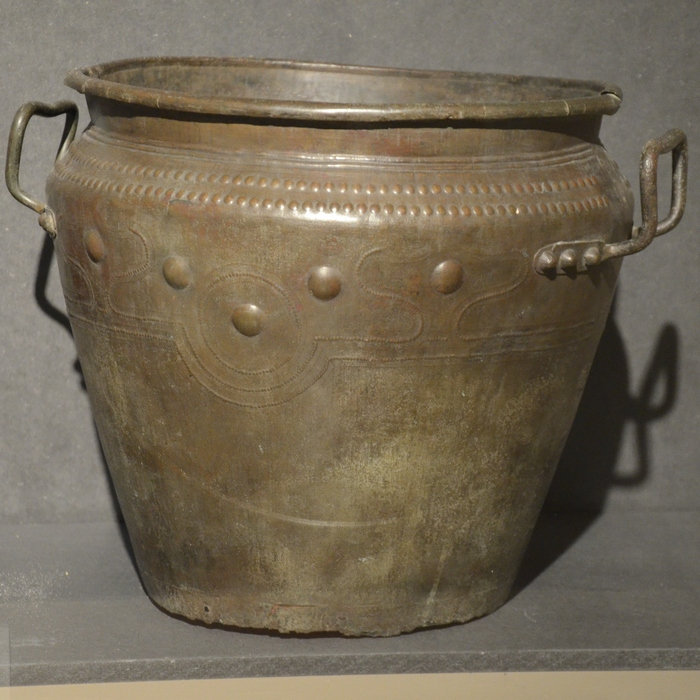

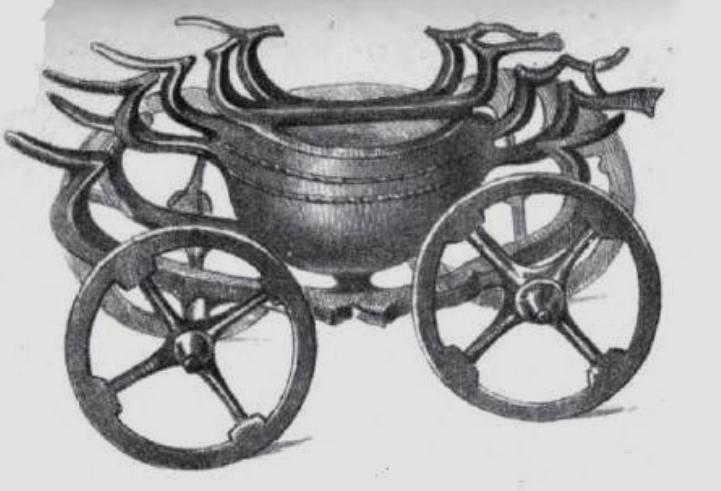

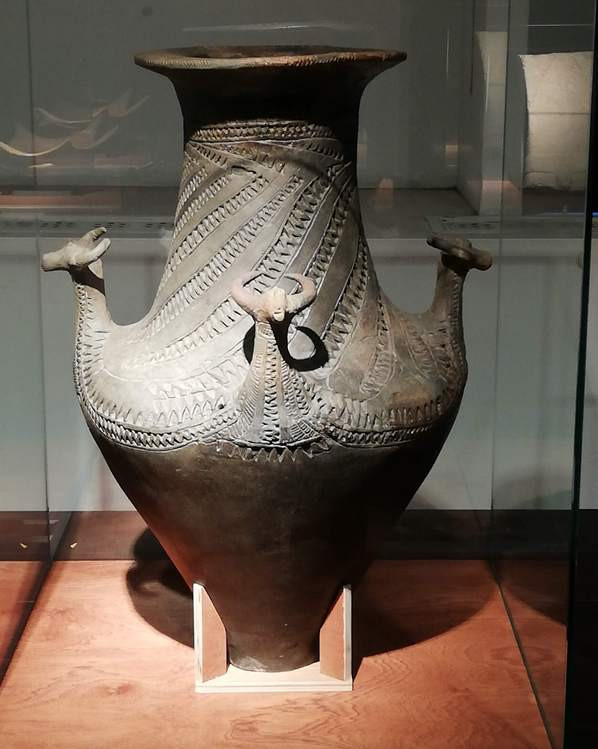

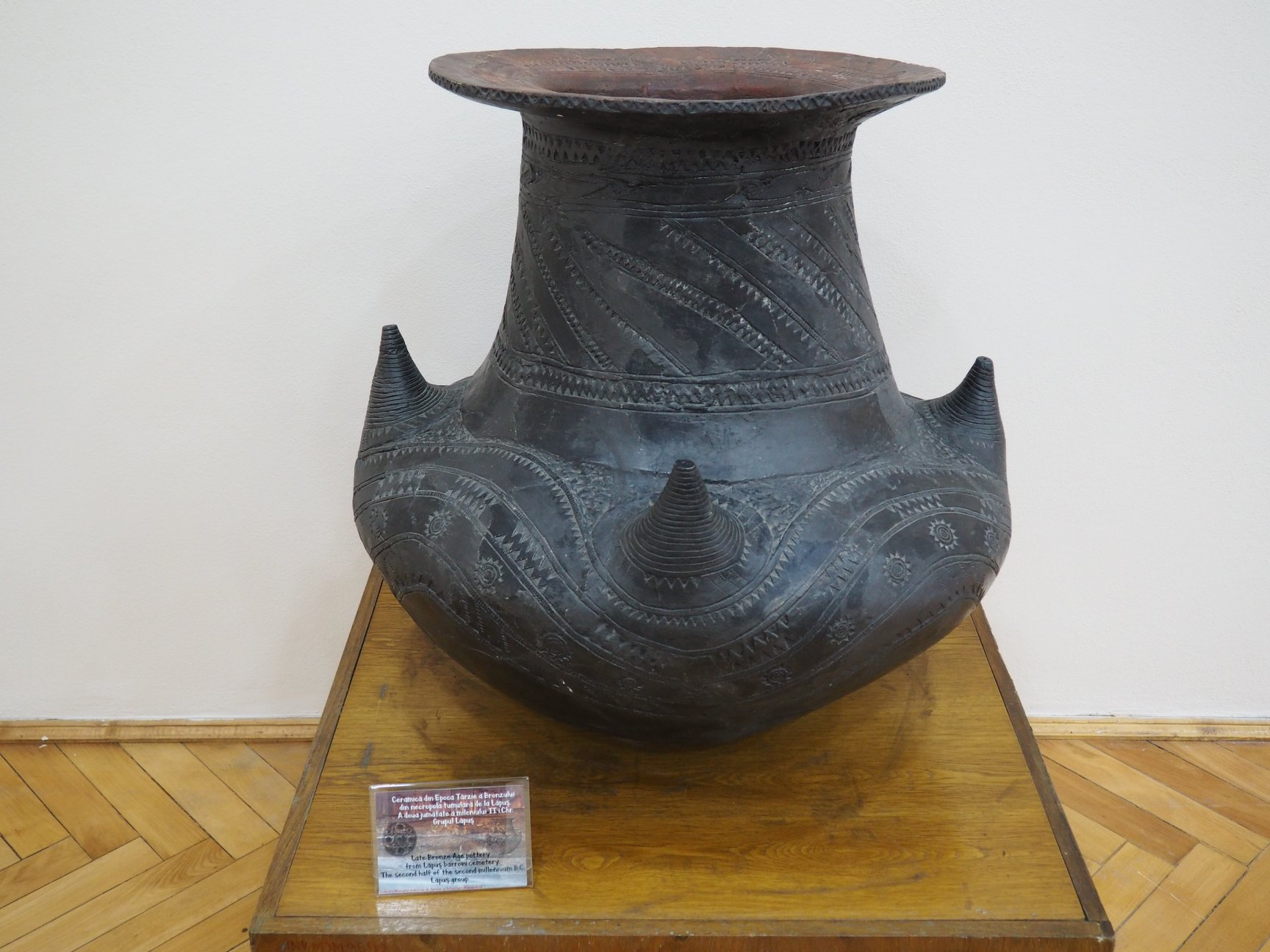

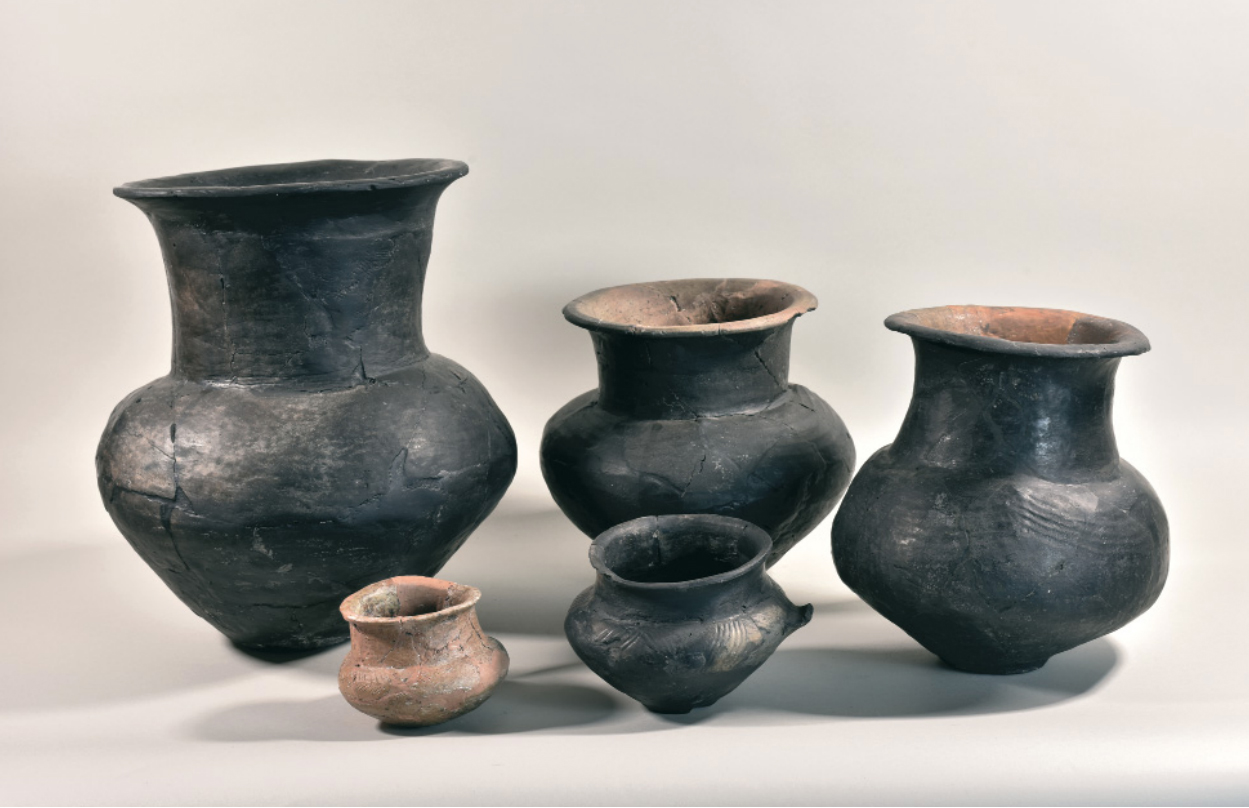

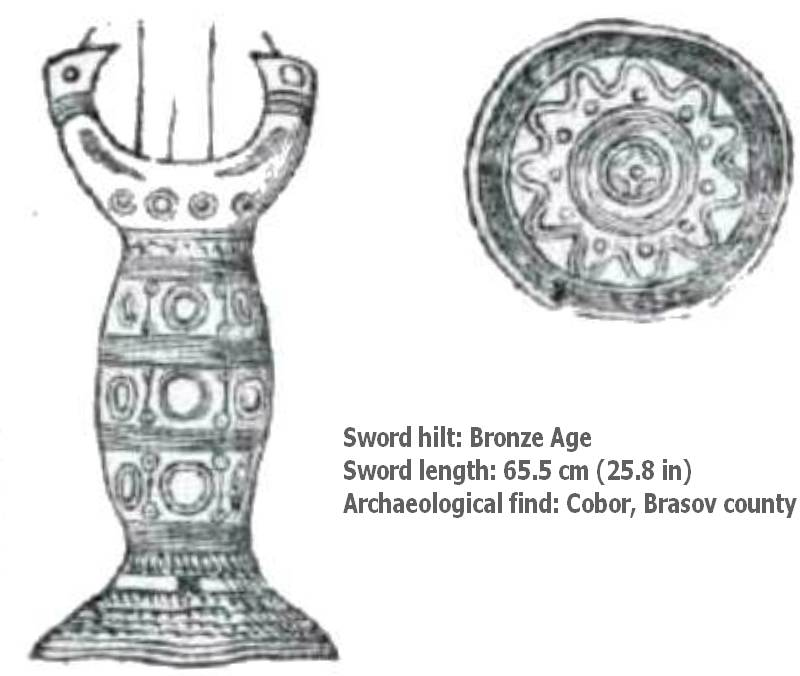

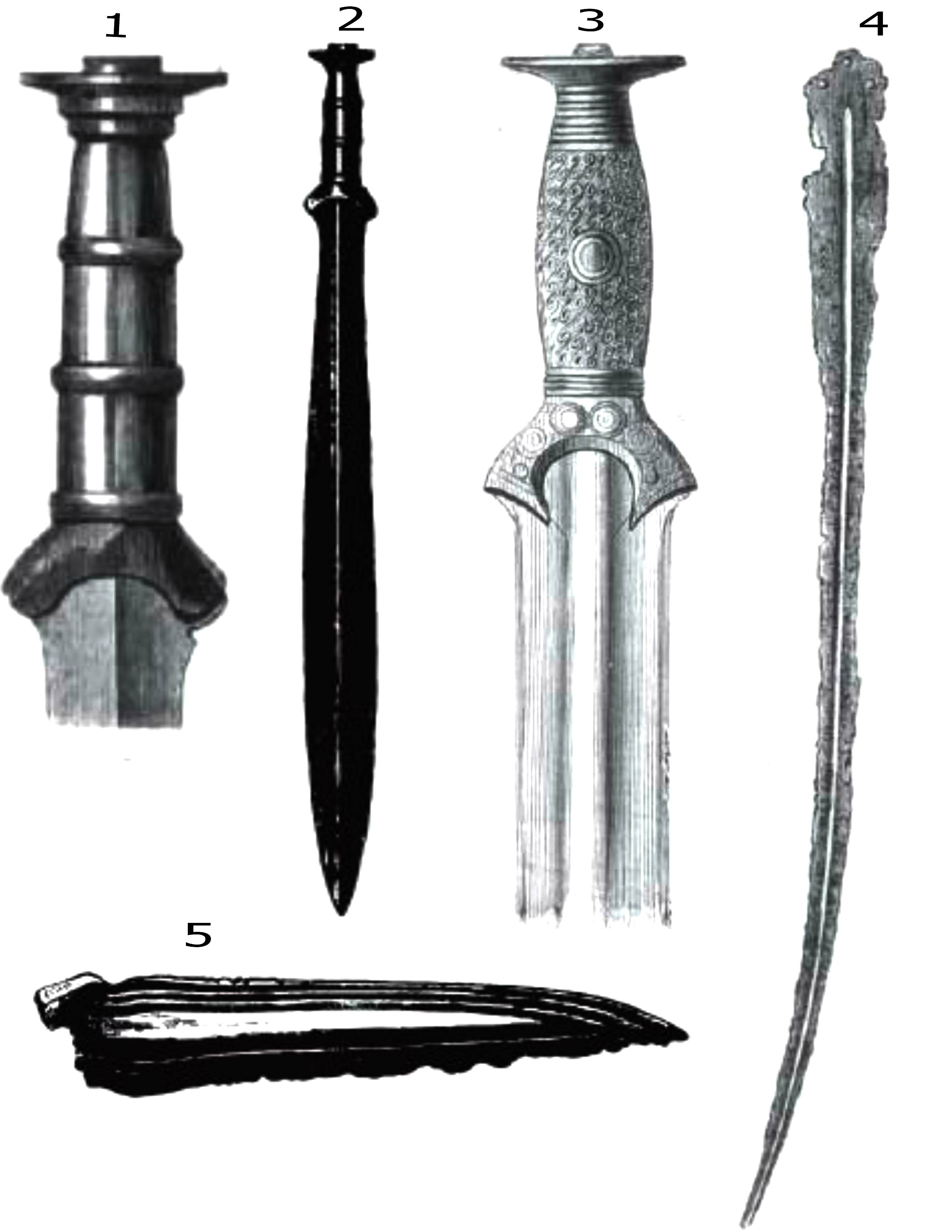

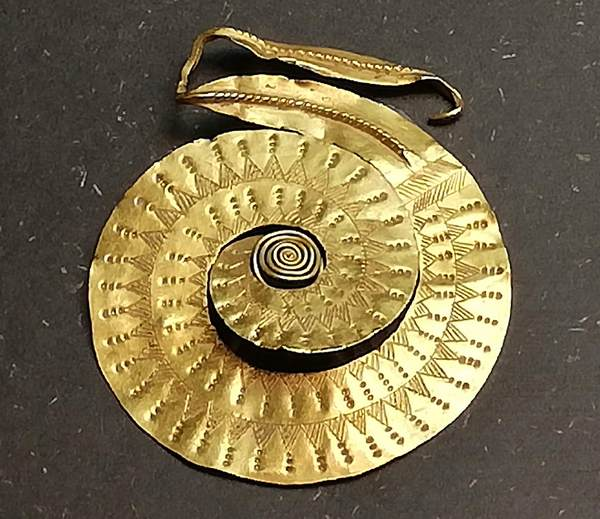
Sarasau hoard 1300-1200 BC

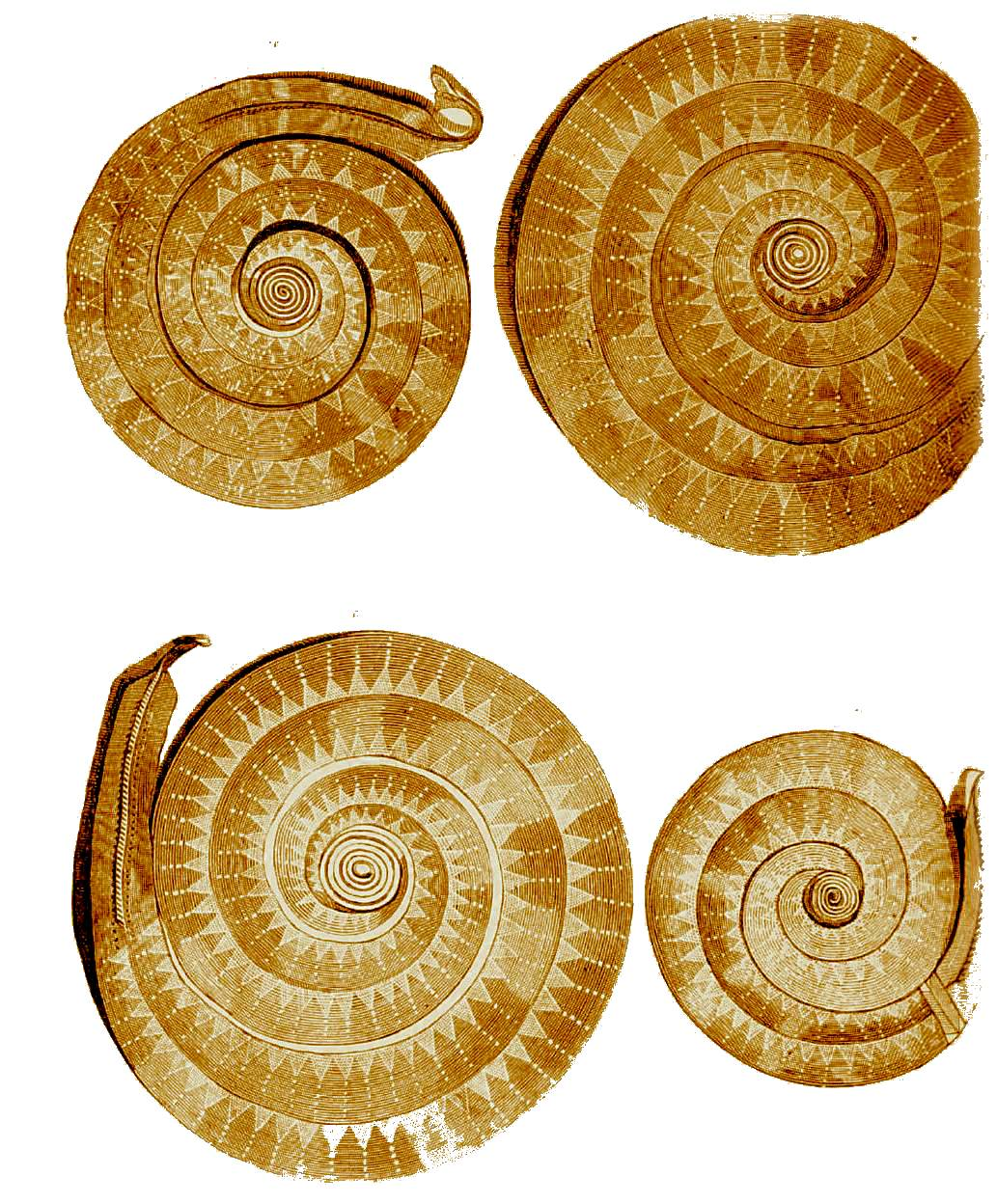
Sarasau hoard 1300-1200 BC

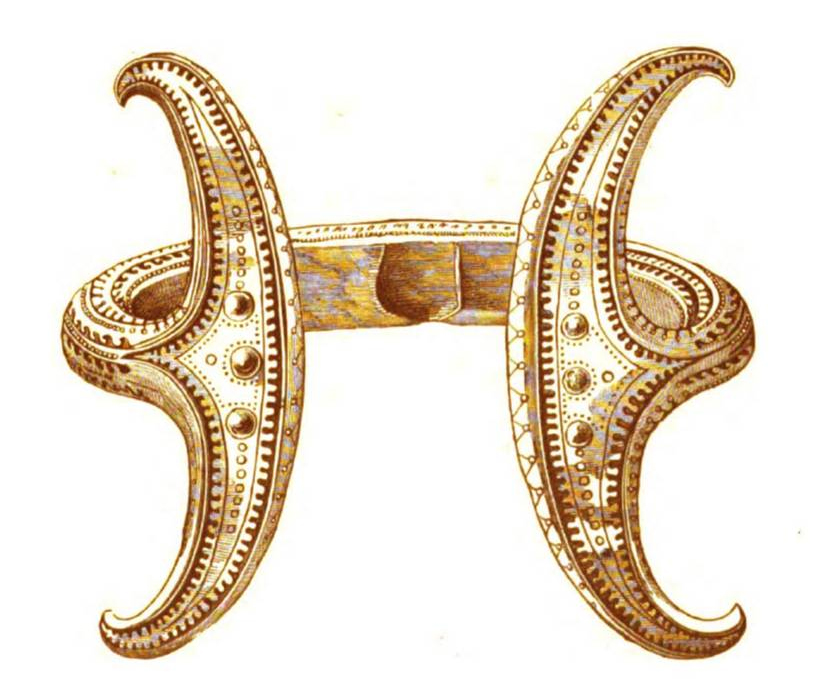

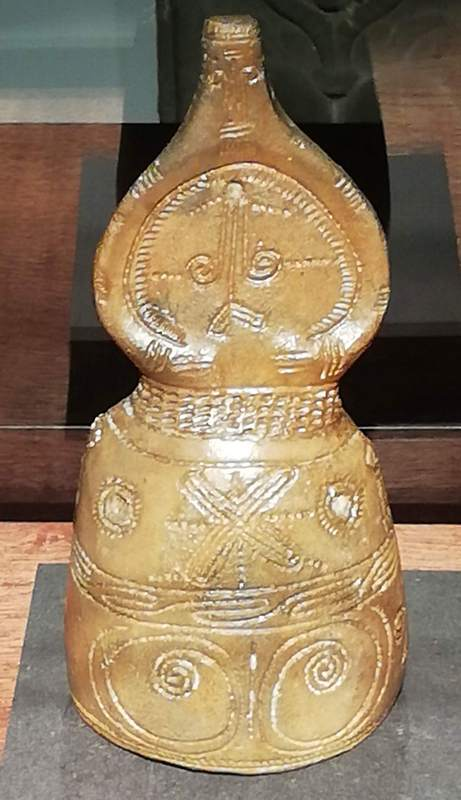

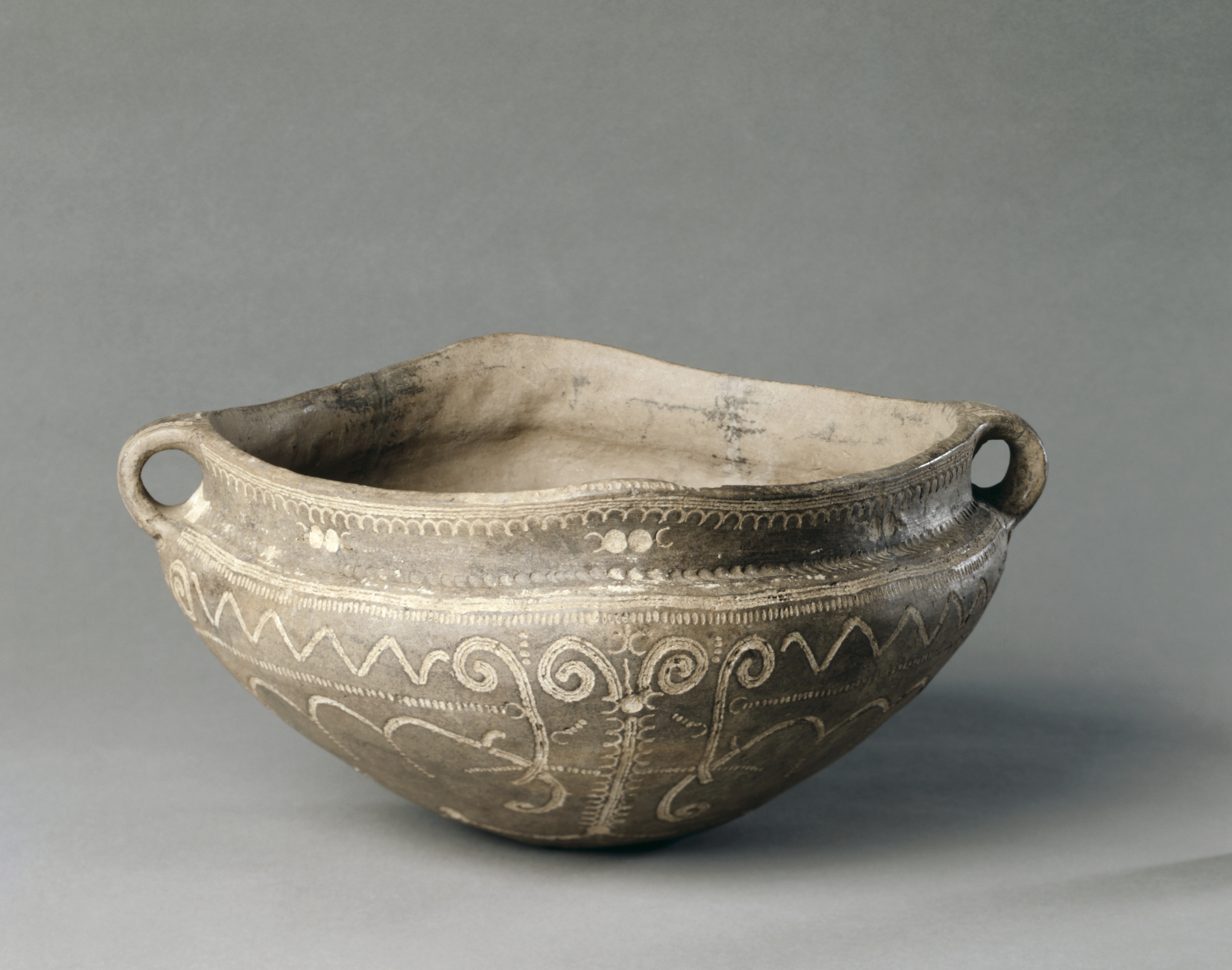

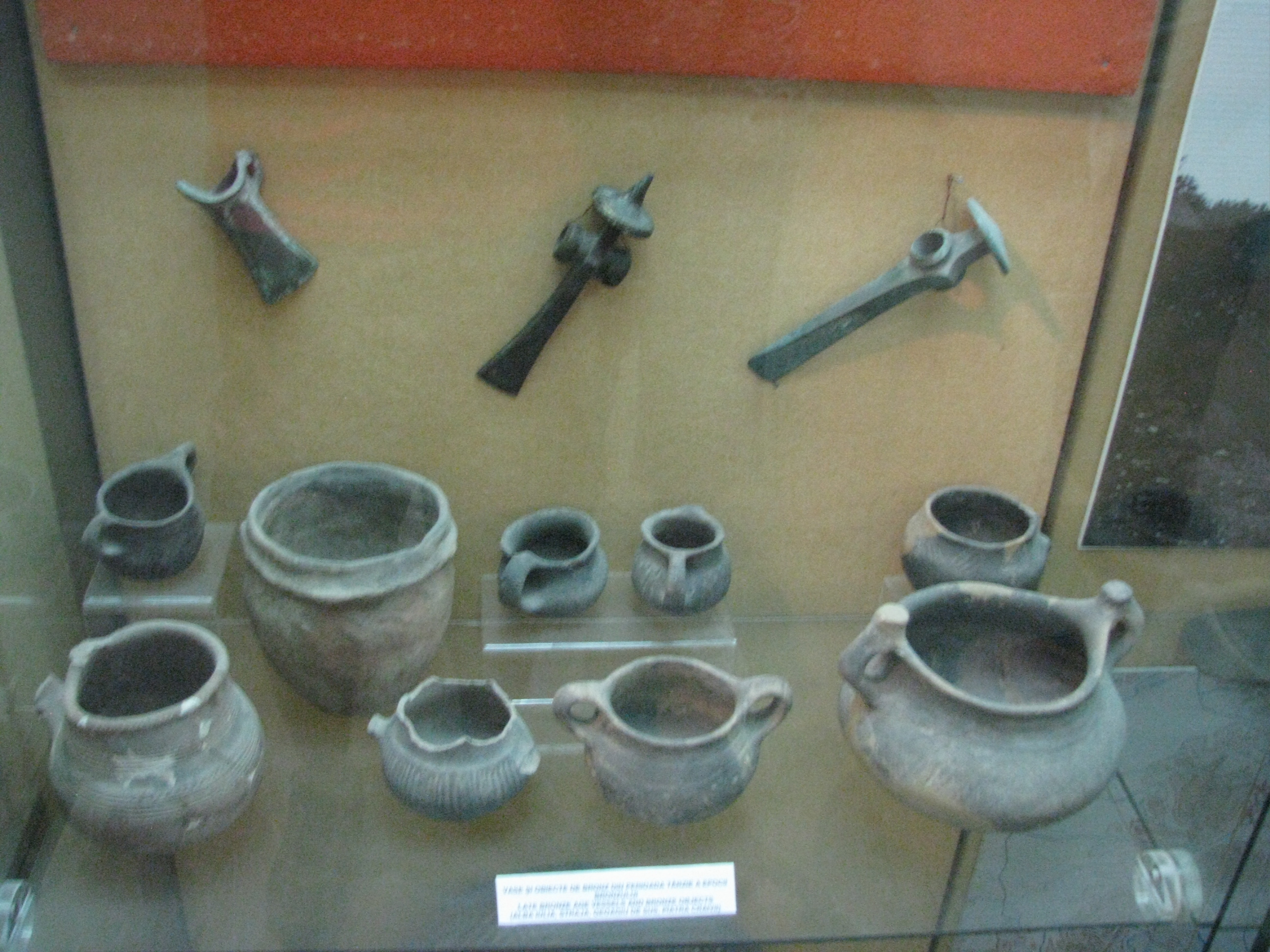

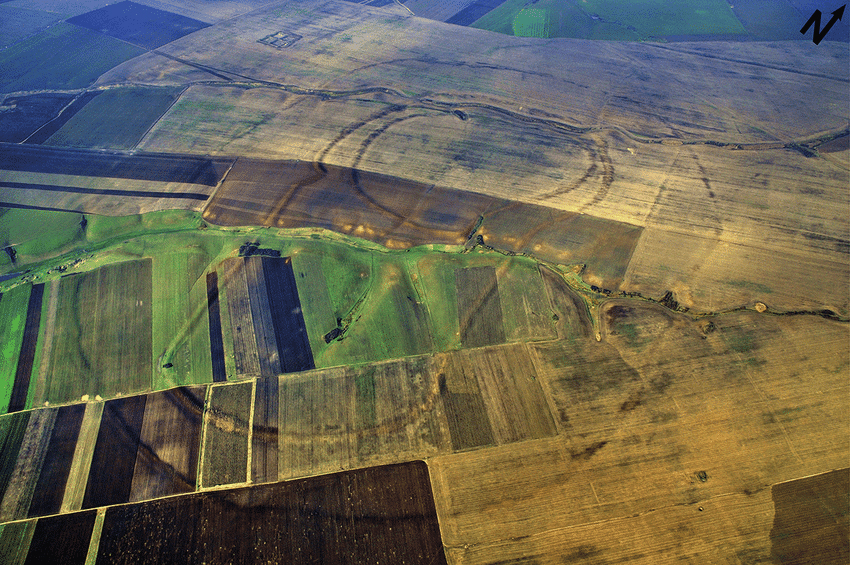

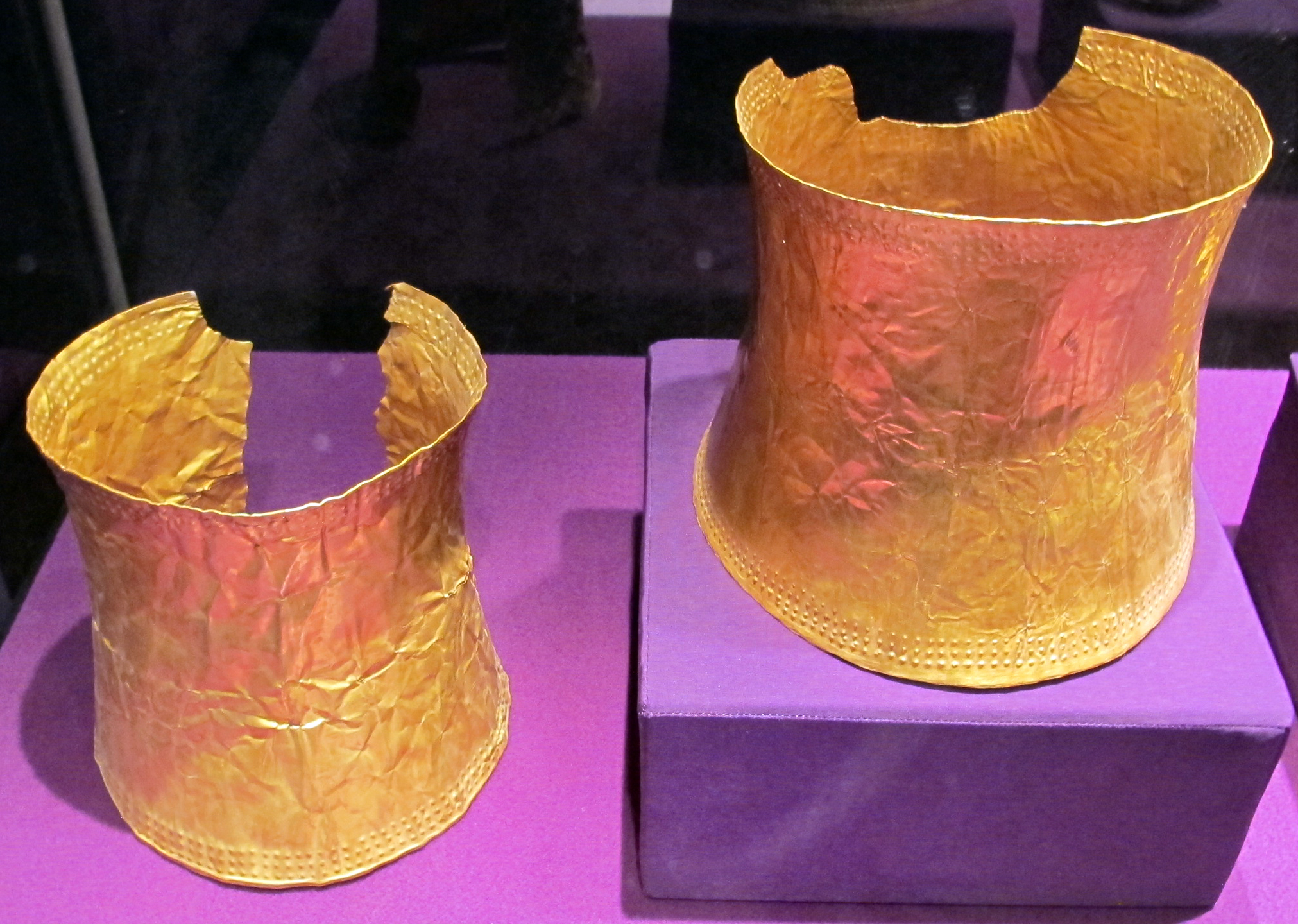

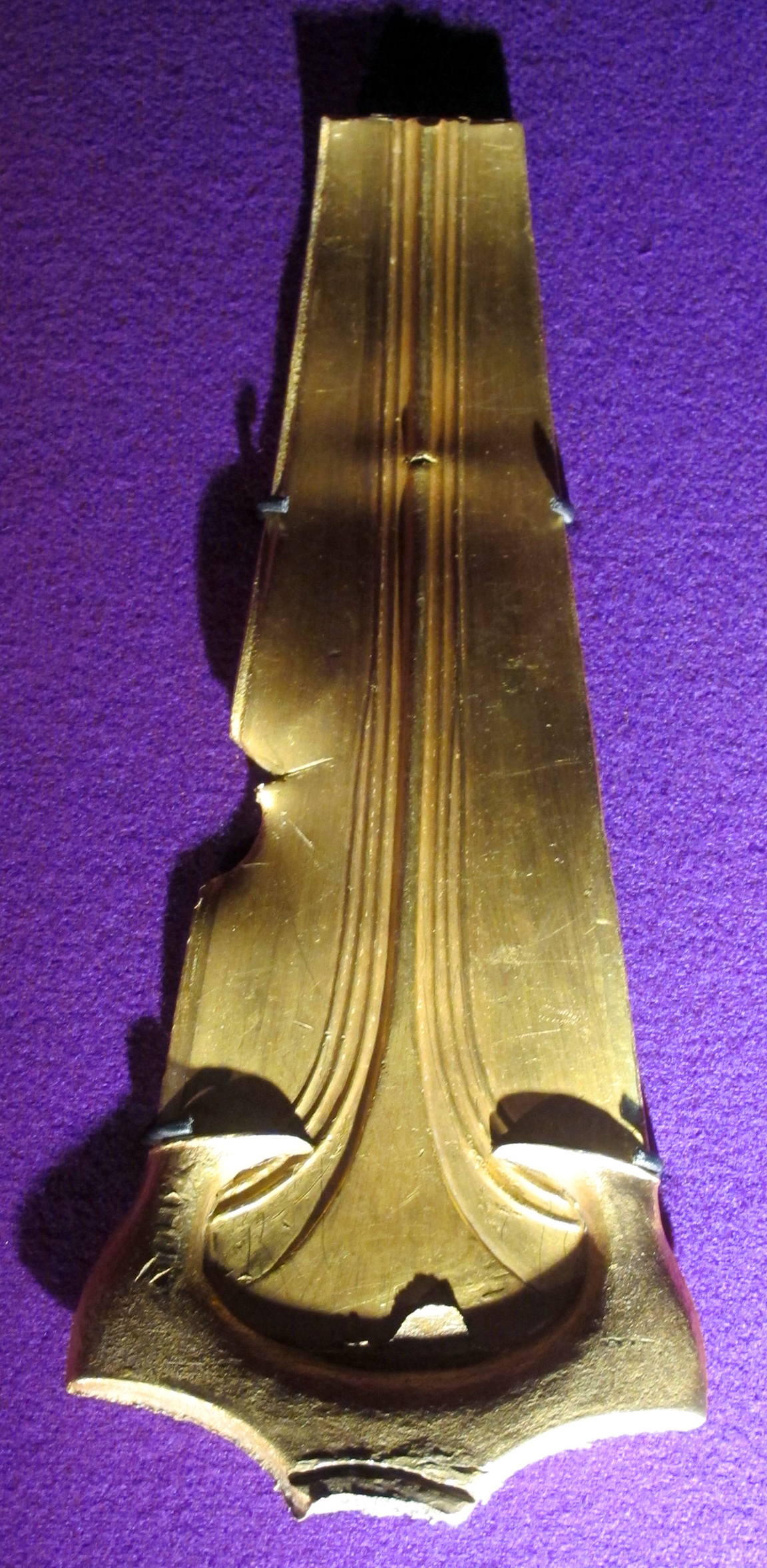

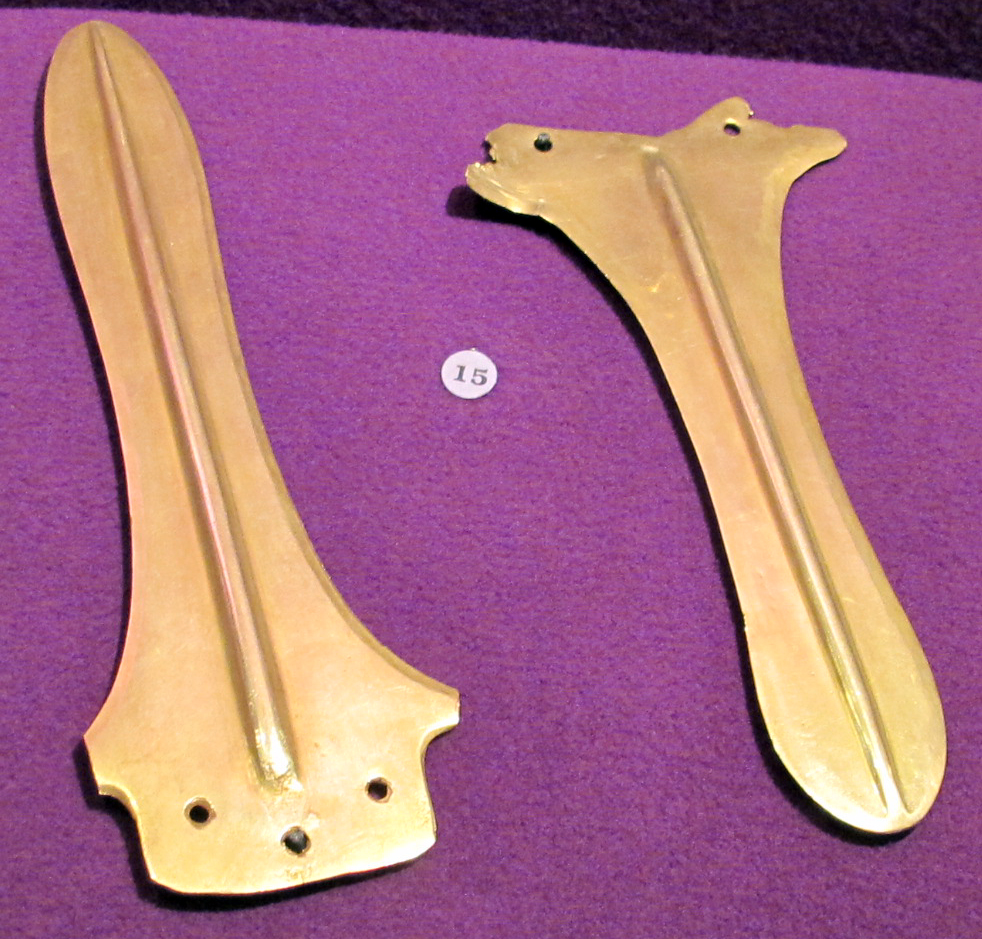

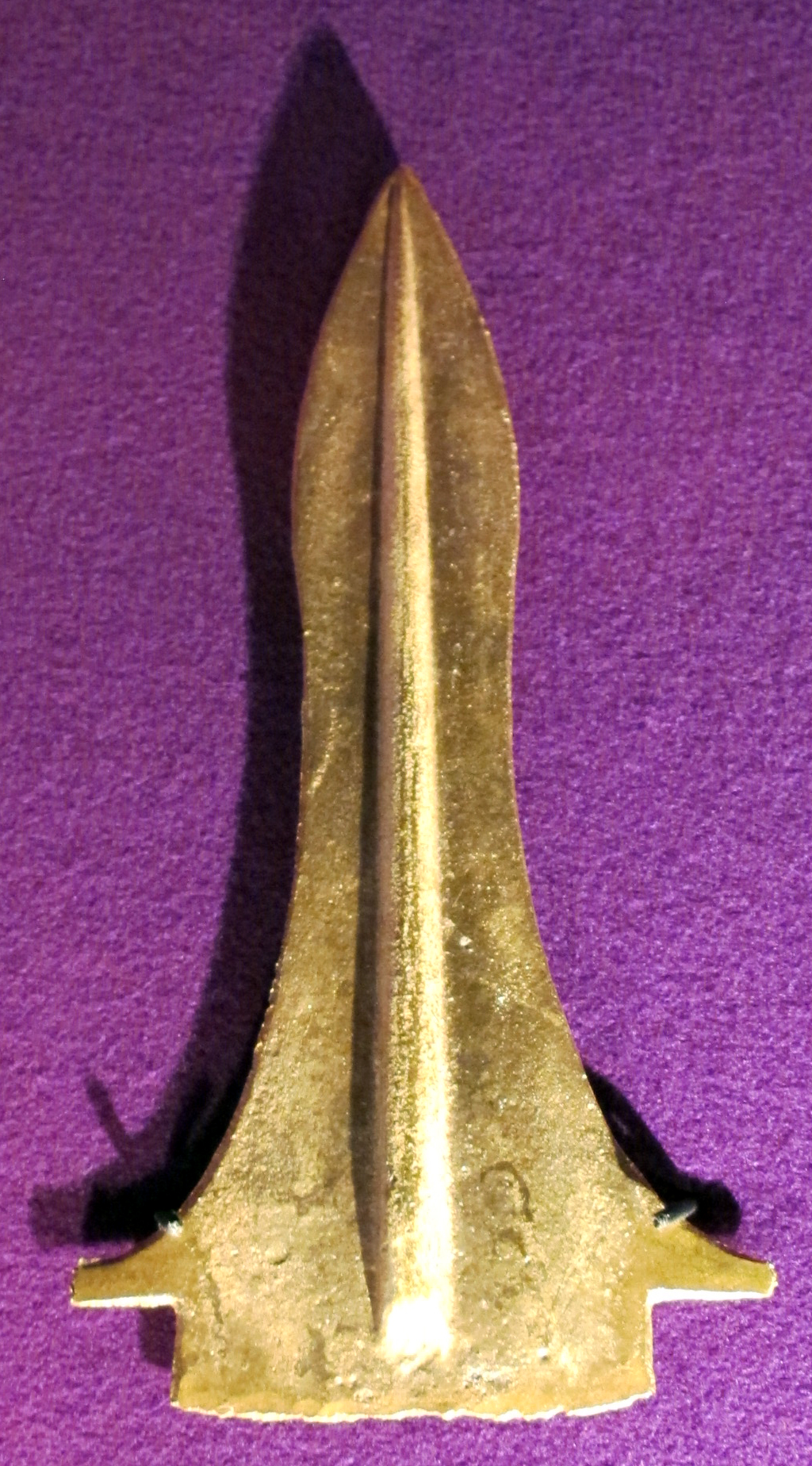

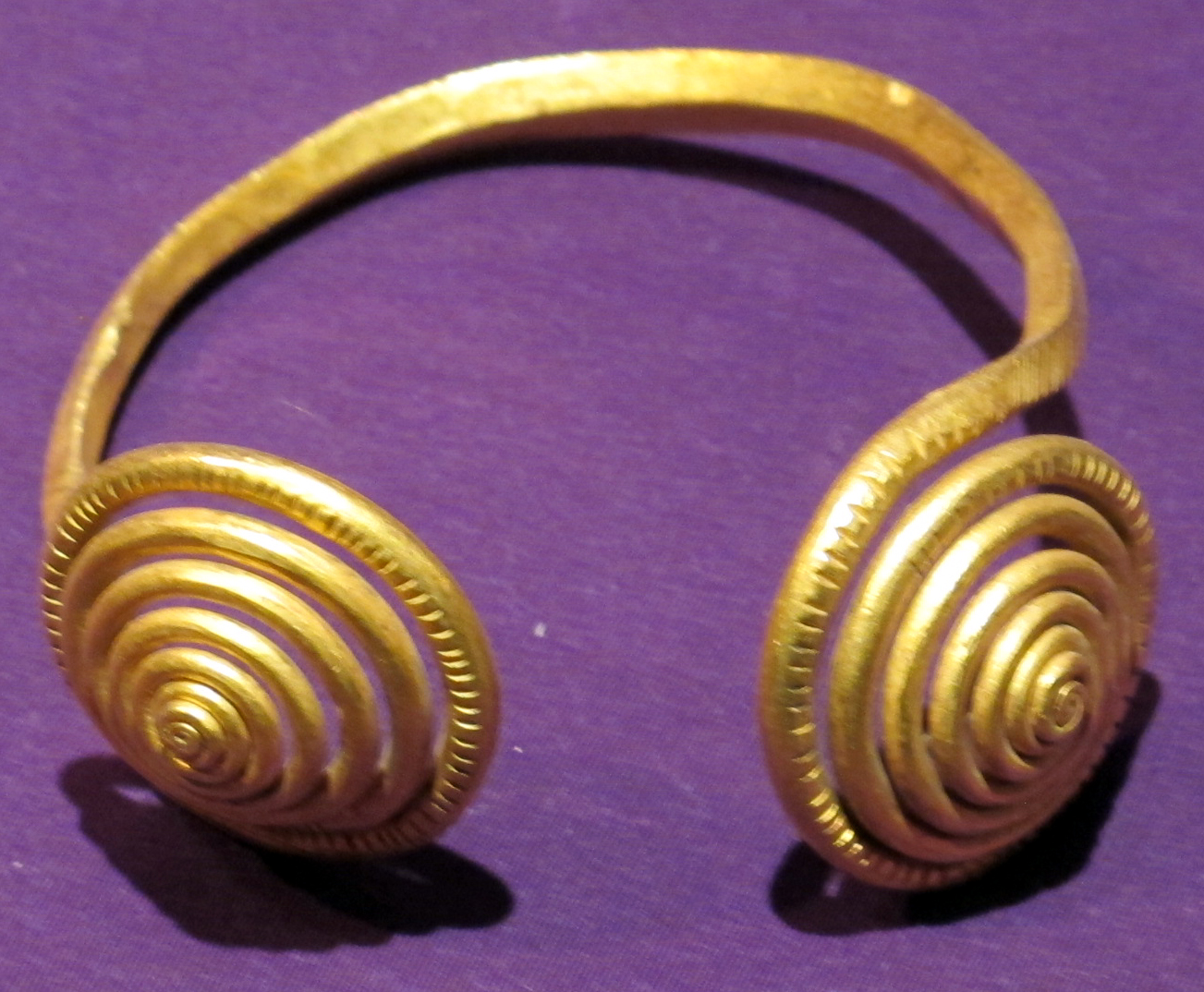

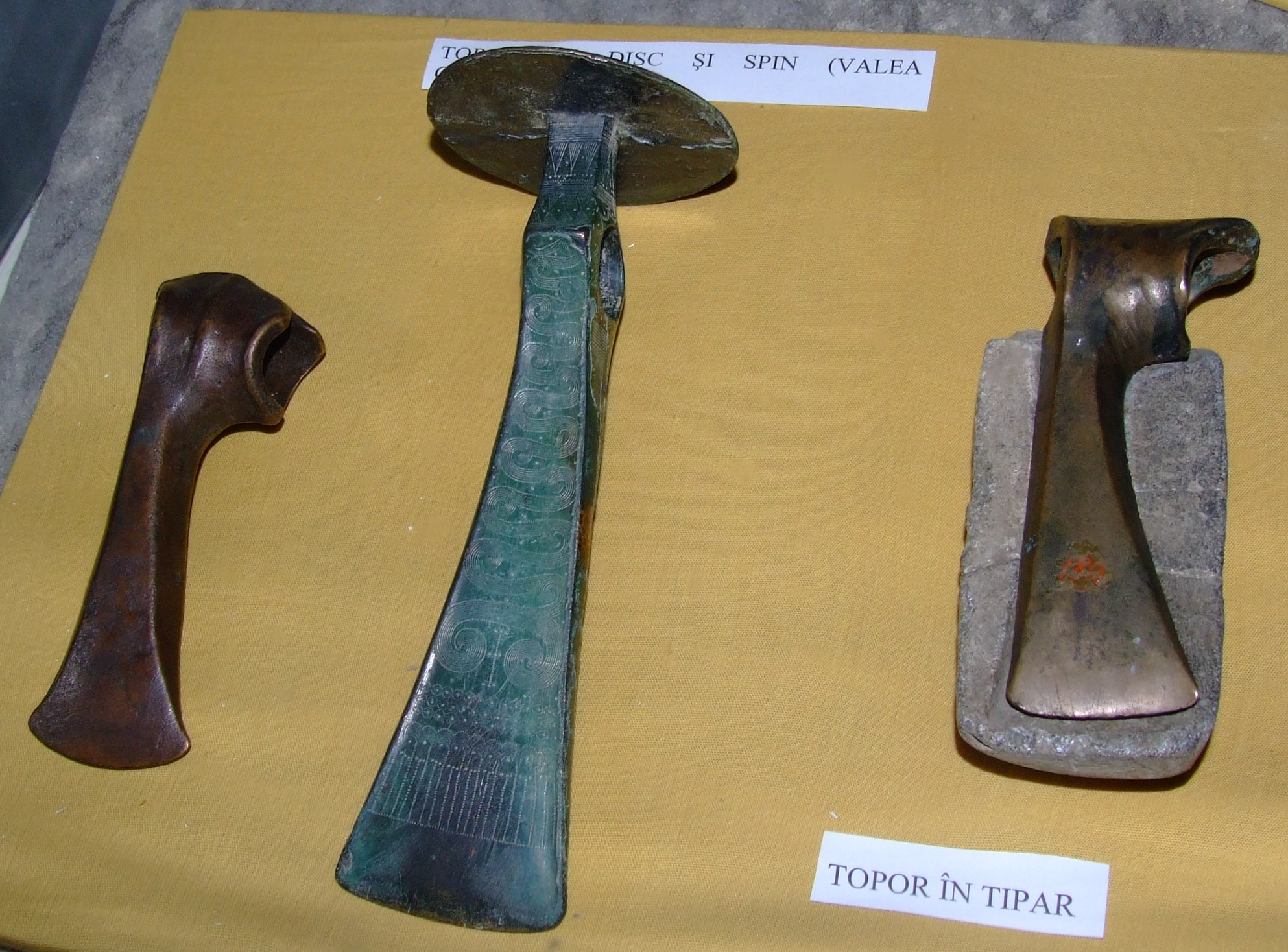

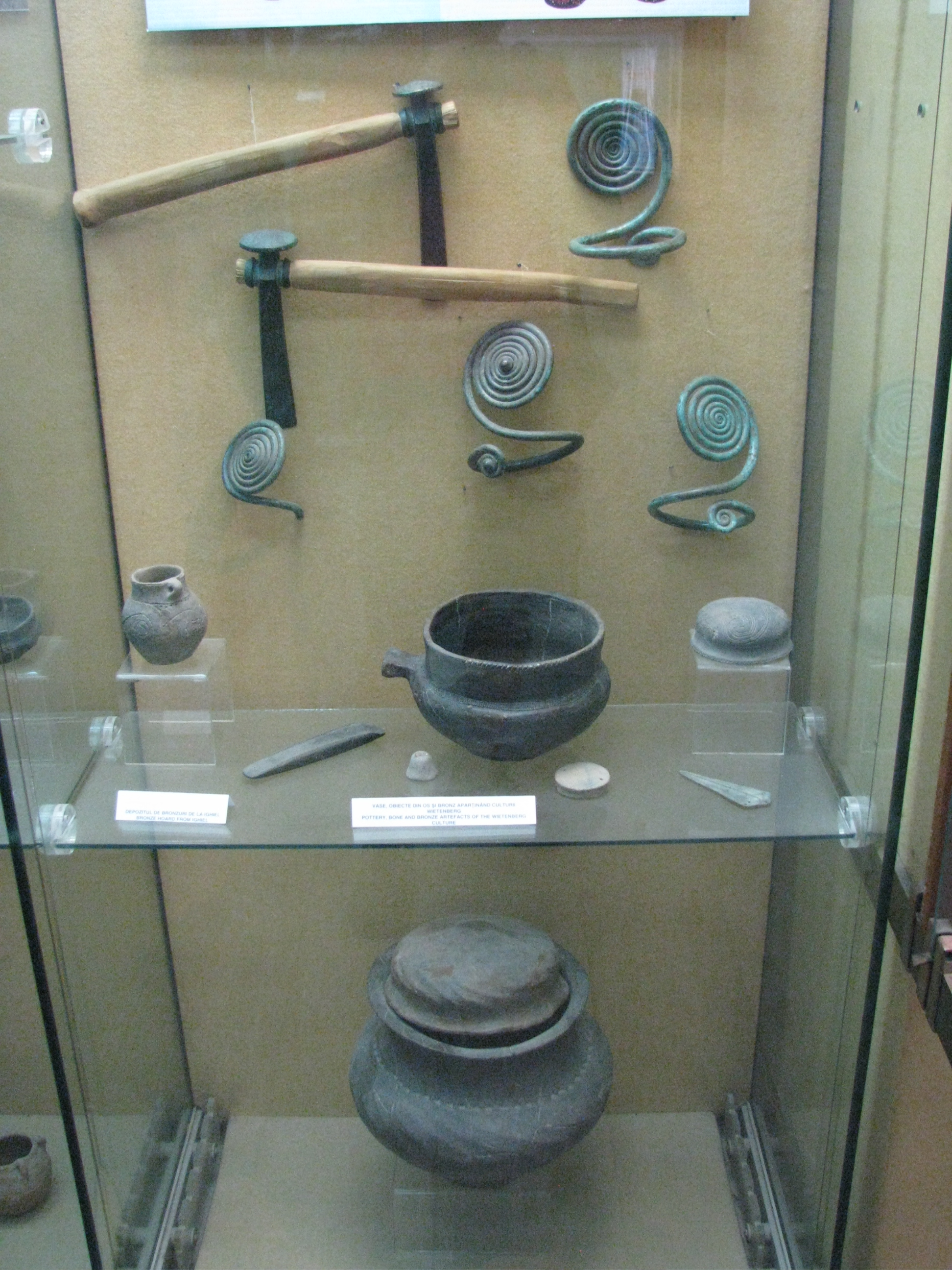

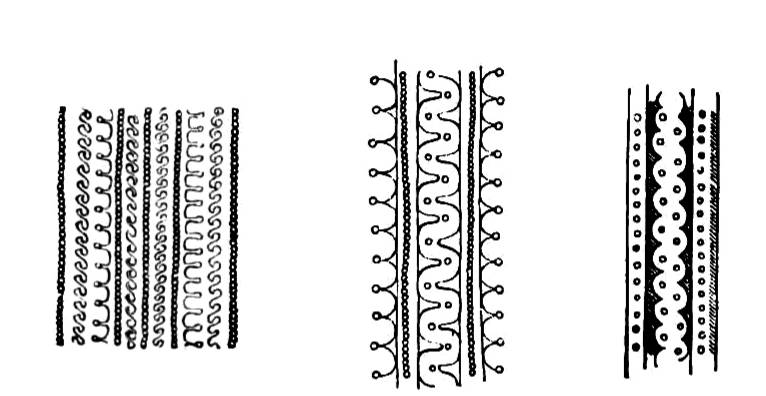

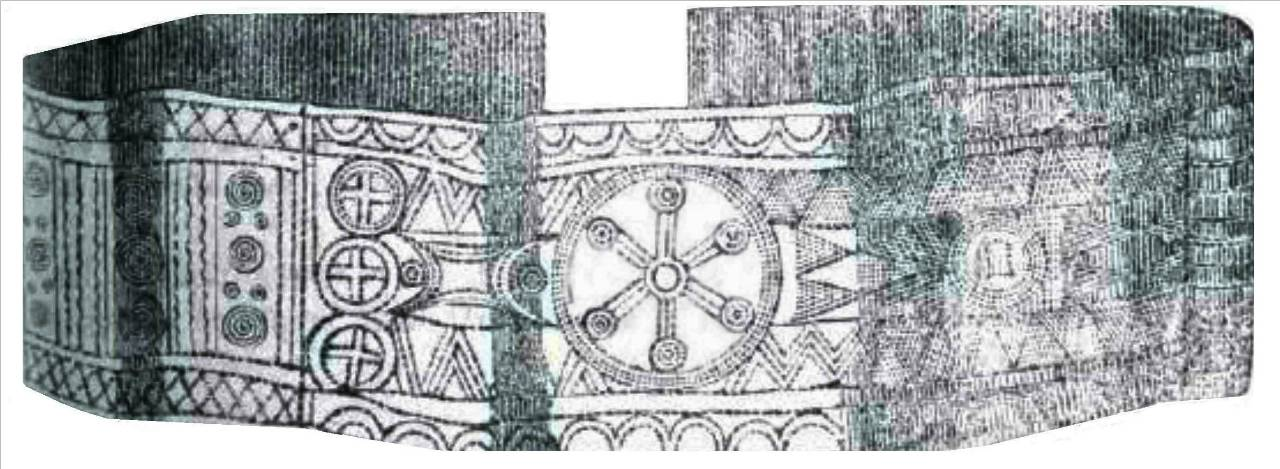

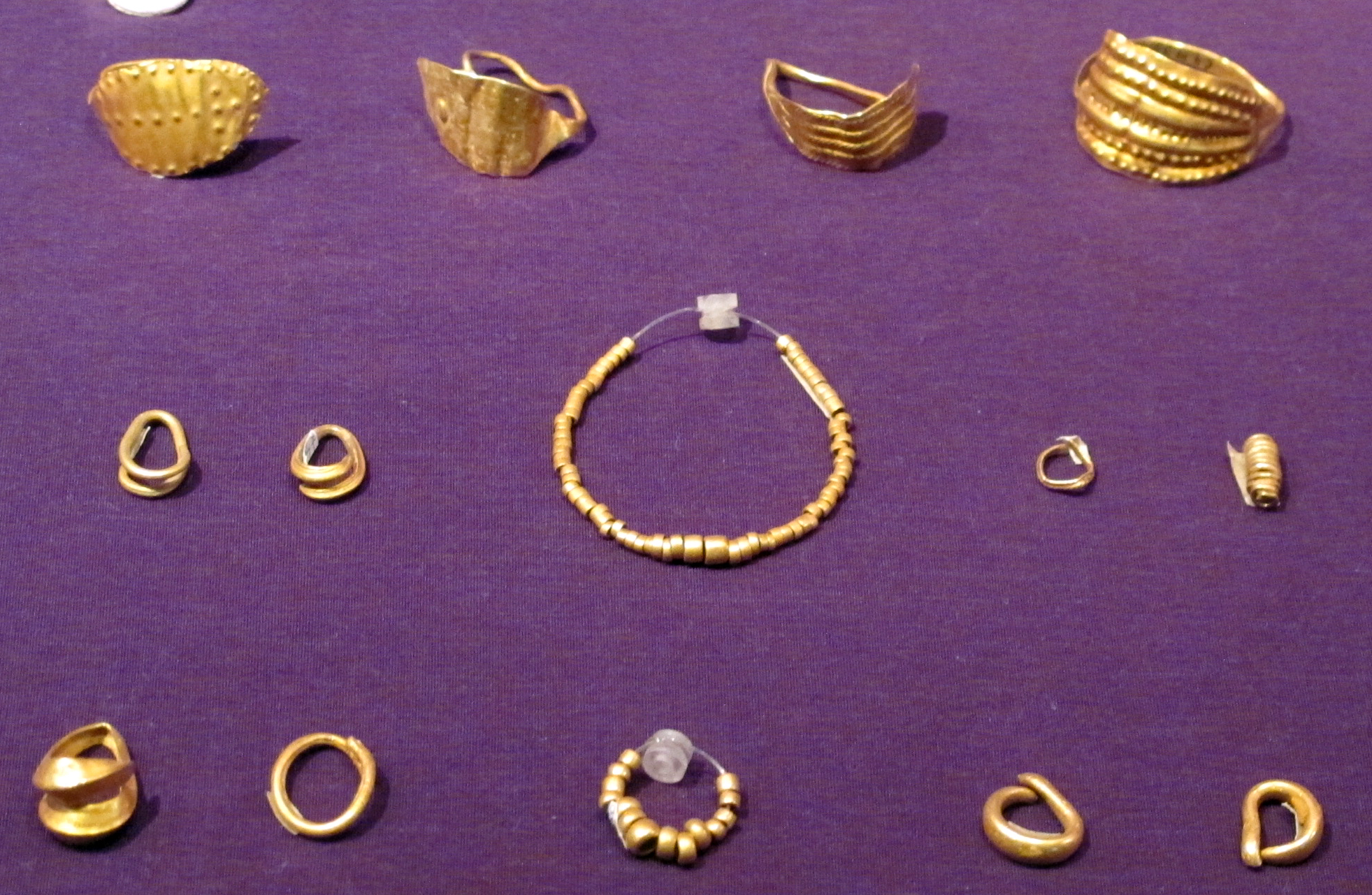

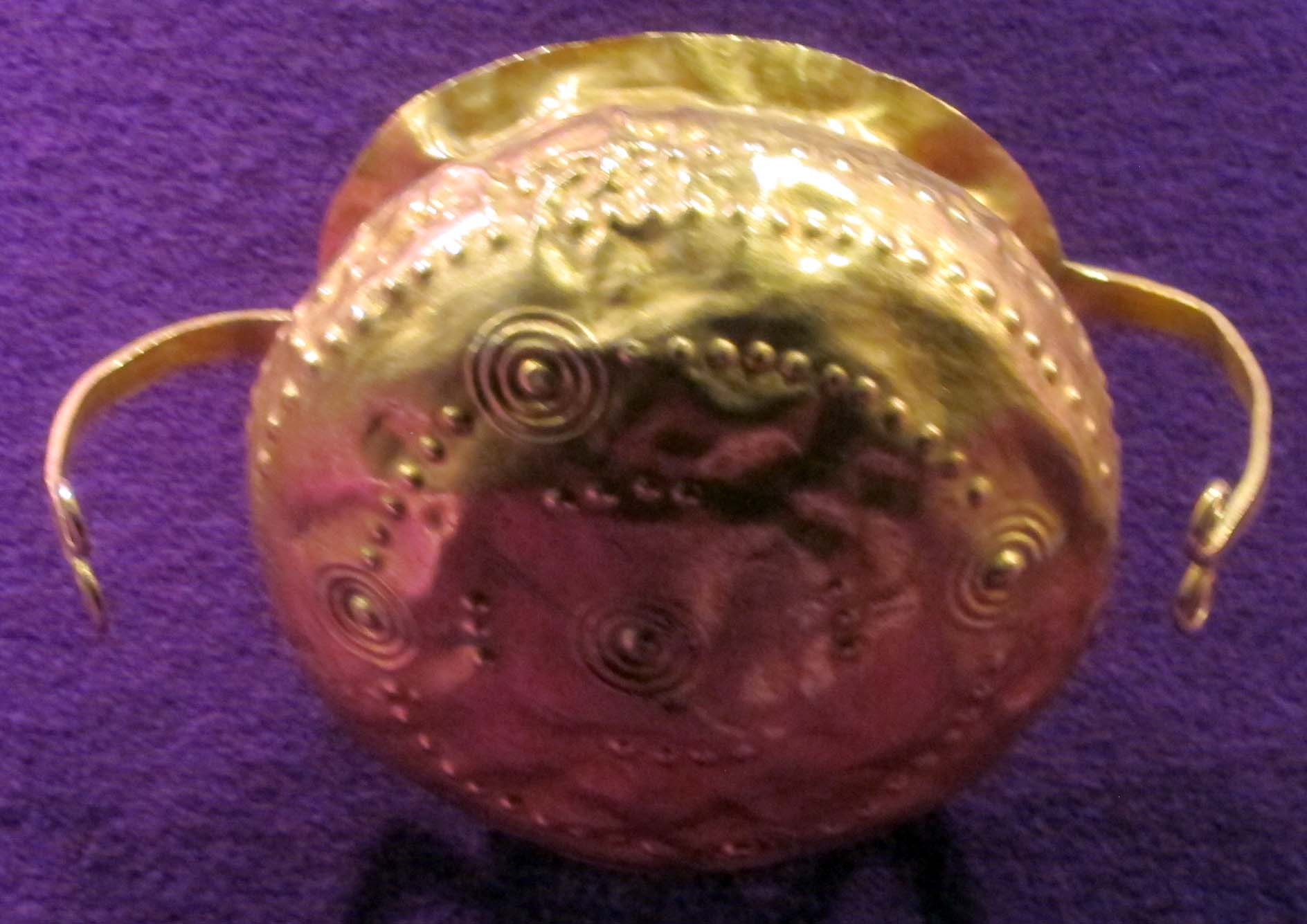

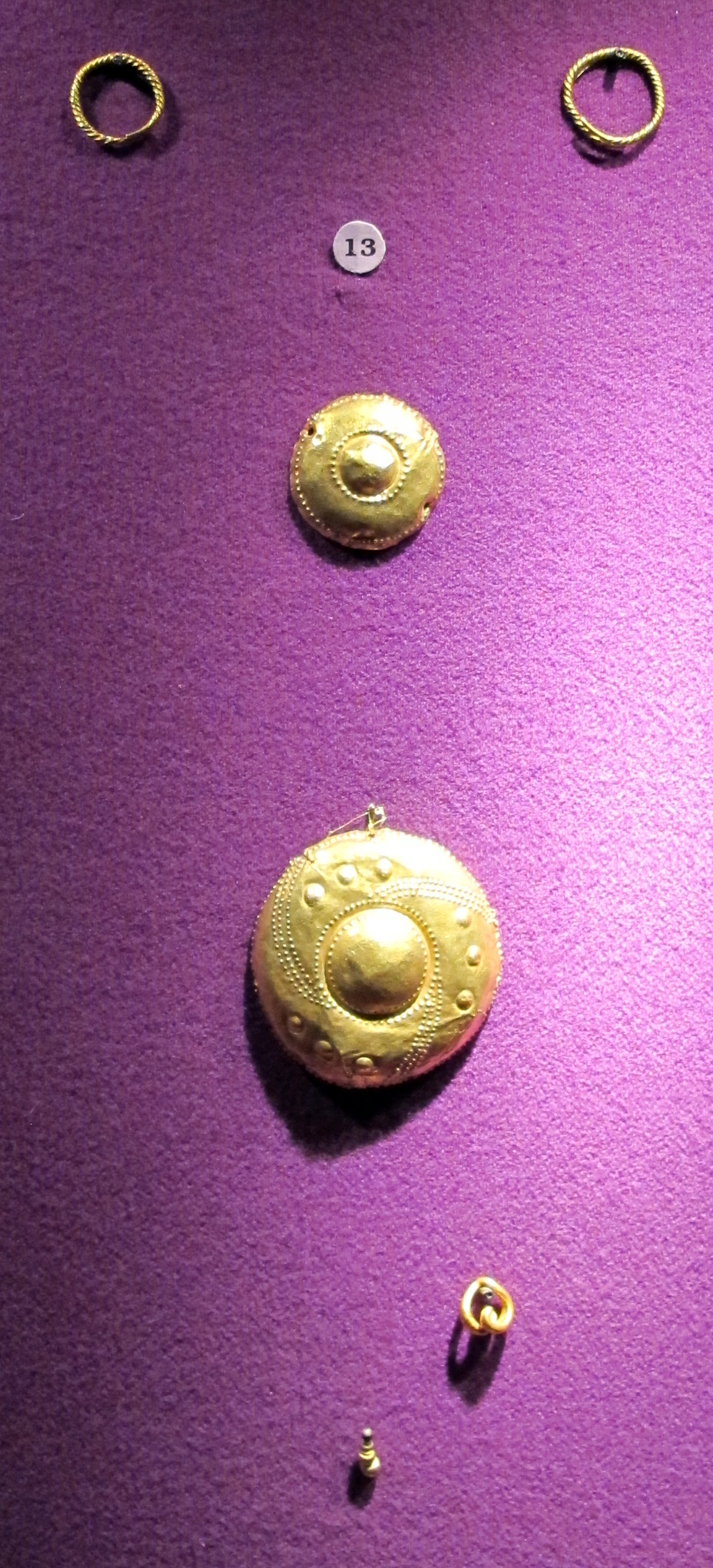

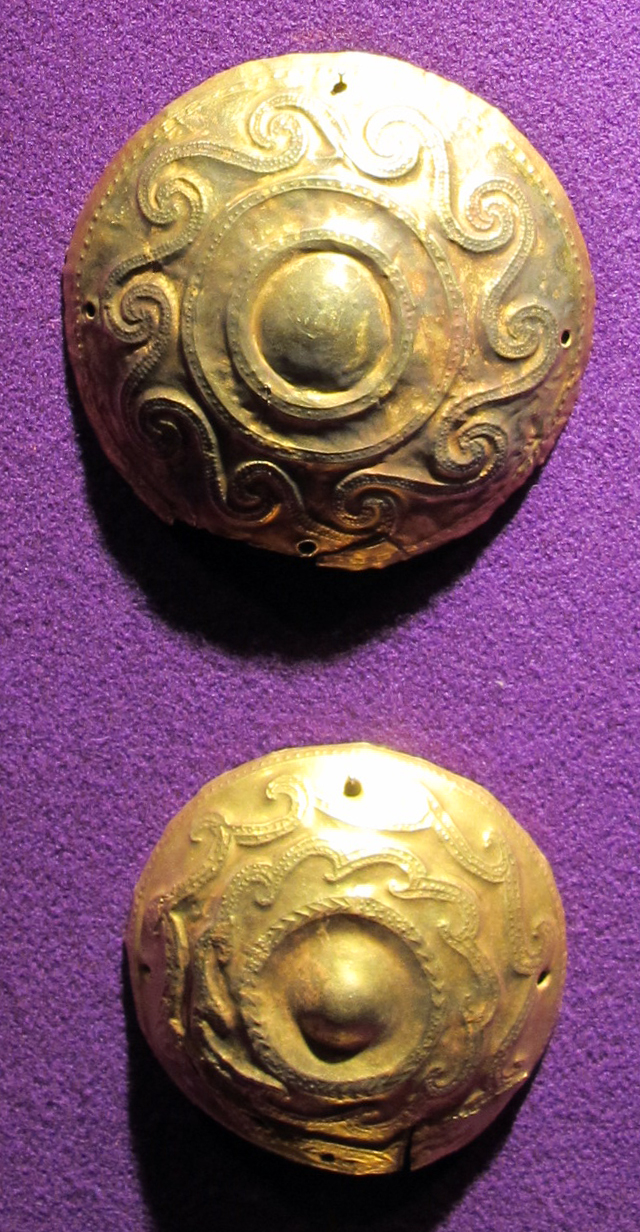

== See also ==
- Bronze Age in Transylvania
- Bronze Age in Southeastern Europe
- Bronze Age in Europe
- Basarabi culture
- Coțofeni culture
- Otomani culture
- Pecica culture
- Wietenberg culture
- Celts in Transylvania
- Getae
- Rotbav Archaeological Site
