= Glina-Schneckenberg culture =

Early bronze age culture in Romania

- Geographical range: Romania
- Period: Chalcolithic, Bronze Age
- Dates: c. 2600 – 2000 BC
- Preceded by: Coțofeni culture
- Followed by: Monteoru culture, Tei culture

The Glina-Schneckenberg culture was an Early Bronze Age archaeological culture located in Romania, dating from c. 2600 BC to 2000 BC. It was preceded by the Coțofeni culture and succeeded by the Monteoru culture and Tei culture.

== See also ==
- Helladic Greece
- Bell Beaker culture
- Únětice culture
