= Pietz =

Pietz is a surname. Notable people with the surname include:

- Allan Pietz (1925–2021), Canadian politician
- Amy Pietz (born 1969), American actress
- William Pietz (born 1951), American historian and political activist

== See also ==
- Lietz
- Piet (given name)
