= Dykyi Sad archaeological site =

Dykyi Sad
- Дикий Сад (Ukrainian)
- Interactive map of Dykyi Sad
- 46.981°N 31.983°E

Immovable Monument of Local Significance of Ukraine
- Official name: Городище «Дикий Сад» (Dykyi Sad fortified settlement)
- Type: Archaeology
- Reference no.: 231-Мк

Dykyi Sad (укр. Дикий Сад, literally "Wild Garden") was a fortified urban settlement (proto-city) of the final Bronze Age, located in the historical center of modern-day Mykolaiv, Ukraine. Situated on a high promontory at the confluence of the Southern Bug and Inhul rivers, the site is an essential monument of the Belozerka culture in the Northern Black Sea region. Radiocarbon and archaeological dating places its primary period of occupation between the late 13th and 10th centuries BC (predominantly 1186–925 BC). Discovered in 1927 by archaeologist F. T. Kaminsky, the site derives its contemporary name from a 19th-century fruit garden established in the area.

Covering an area of over 4 hectares, Dykyi Sad demonstrates a complex radial-ring architectural layout. The settlement was divided into distinct structural zones: a central fortified "citadel", densely built "suburbs" (divided into near and far sectors). This structure was protected by a system of two defensive moats. To date, over 50 architectural objects have been excavated, including residential complexes with stone foundations, craft workshops, storage facilities, and unique ritual structures such as a sanctuary with a ramp.

Strategically positioned at the intersection of major land and water routes, Dykyi Sad functioned as a key economic, trade, and craft hub in the Northern Black Sea region. The settlement was notable for its advanced bronze metallurgy, comprehensive agriculture, and bone carving, particularly the mass production of horse bridle cheekpieces (psalia). Based on the scale of the findings and the site's chronology, some researchers associate Dykyi Sad with the legendary "city of Cimmerian people" mentioned by Homer in the Odyssey, pointing to its chronological and cultural-economic ties with Troy and Mycenaean Greece.

== Etymology and history of the name ==
The name of the site originates from the early 19th century, when a garden of fruit and ornamental trees was established near the house of the commander-in-chief of the Black Sea Fleet and military governor of Mykolaiv, located at the intersection of Admiral and Embankment streets. The garden was originally laid out by Admiral Aleksey Greig during his tenure as governor of the city.

Although its official name was the Admiral's Garden, it acquired the popular moniker "Wild Garden" (Dykyi Sad) over time because the trees were wild and did not bear fruit. By the beginning of the 20th century, the garden had fallen into neglect and become wild.

Dykyi Sad suffered severe damage during both World Wars, as local residents cut down its trees due to severe shortages of firewood and coal. Following World War II, the area was left as a wasteland with only a few surviving bushes, and it was eventually built over, but the historic name of the location has persisted.

== Discovery and excavations ==
The Dykyi Sad archaeological site was discovered on August 15, 1927, by Mykolaiv archaeologist and local historian Feodosii Kaminsky. After heavy rains washed out ceramic fragments and animal bones in a local ravine, Kaminsky began surface explorations, naming the site "Dykyi Sad" to preserve the area's historical toponym. Between 1927 and 1929, the most significant artifact recovered during this initial phase was a large riveted bronze cauldron, which is currently exhibited at the Mykolaiv Regional Museum of Local History.

In 1956, the Black Sea Archaeological Expedition of the Kyiv State University, directed by Lazar Slavin and Oleksandr Malovanov, conducted the first formal excavations. The team uncovered the stone foundations of the earliest recorded structures in the northeastern part of the settlement. Following additional surface collections by Kaminsky in the late 1950s, research halted, and for decades the site was mistakenly considered a secondary settlement largely destroyed by natural erosion.

A significant paradigm shift occurred in the early 1990s when archaeologist Yurii Grebennikov resumed research at the site. His excavations uncovered new residential, economic, and cult structures, which significantly expanded the artifact collection and definitively reclassified the settlement as belonging to the Belozerka culture.

The modern and most comprehensive phase of excavations began in 1998, led by Kyrylo Horbenko, who was later joined by Oleksandr Smyrnov. Since 2003, annual large-scale excavations have fundamentally changed the academic understanding of the site. Researchers discovered complex defensive moats, horse bridle elements (psalia), bronze casting molds, and bone rigging tools. These contemporary findings led to the reclassification of Dykyi Sad from a simple village to a fortified proto-city, prompting current discussions about preserving the site as an open-air museum.

== Religion and rituals ==
Excavations at Dykyi Sad have uncovered artifacts and structural features that archaeologists interpret as evidence of early religious practices. According to researchers, the findings suggest a belief system reflecting elements of animism, totemism, and fetishism.

Anthropomorphic stone steles were discovered buried in specially prepared pits within residential and utility structures. This contrasts with the typical kurgan (burial mound) stele placements of the Bronze Age Northern Black Sea region. In one pit, a stele was found below floor level alongside seeds of cultivated grapes; in another, a stele was buried with intentionally broken ceramic vessels, stone tools, and animal bones. Researchers propose these items served as ritual offerings to protector spirits or ancestors. In a separate pit, archaeologists found a human skull lacking its lower jaw, which researchers interpret as a symbolic "carrier of the soul" or a guardian spirit of the location.

Hearths, thick layers of ash, charcoal, and baked clay lenses were found extensively across the settlement. Because hearths frequently overlapped with pits, and the architectural layout required moving through or alongside these burning areas, archaeologists suggest the presence of a cult of fire associated with purification or initiation rituals. In addition to the human skull, these areas contained broken ceramics and a stone spool, which researchers interpret as symbolically destroyed offerings.

Several finds have been associated with totemistic beliefs linked to the local river ecosystem (the Inhul and Southern Bug rivers). A fragment of a turtle shell was recovered among offerings in the fire-associated areas, which researchers suggest may have functioned as a totemic object or a symbolic vessel mediating with the spirit world. Furthermore, a clay pot filled with fish bones, primarily from catfish, was found built directly into the stone masonry of one structure. Researchers interpret this as an act of sympathetic magic intended to ensure fishing success by securing the patronage of a water-dwelling spirit.

Additionally, a carefully modeled limestone phallic symbol was discovered near a stone lintel at a southwestern entrance of an interconnected architectural complex. Archaeologists associate this artifact with a fertility cult, reflecting broader agricultural and vitality traditions of the period.

== Gallery ==
Wild Garden and its surroundings

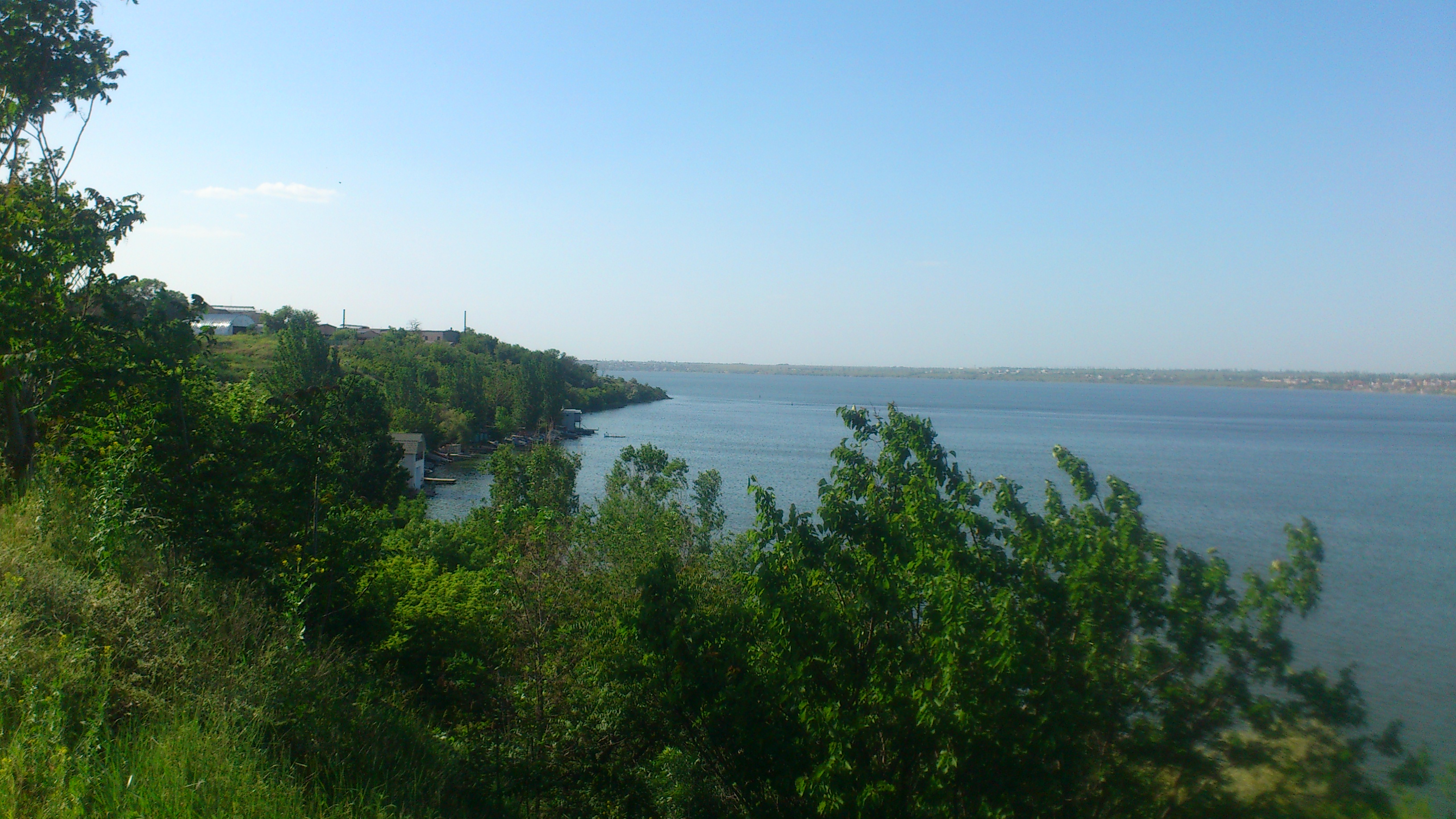
View of the Dykyi Sad

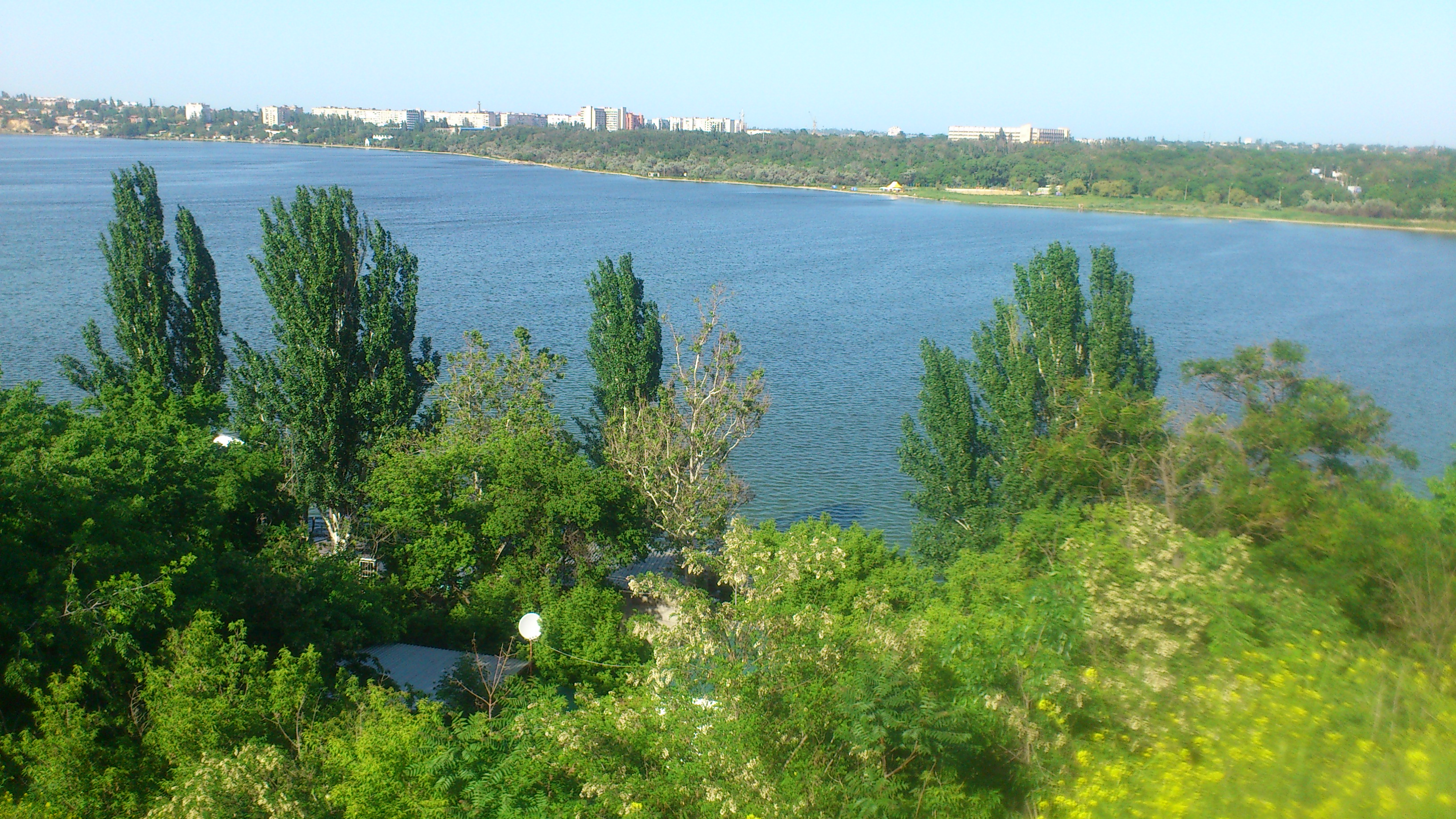
View of the neighborhood from the Dykyi Sad

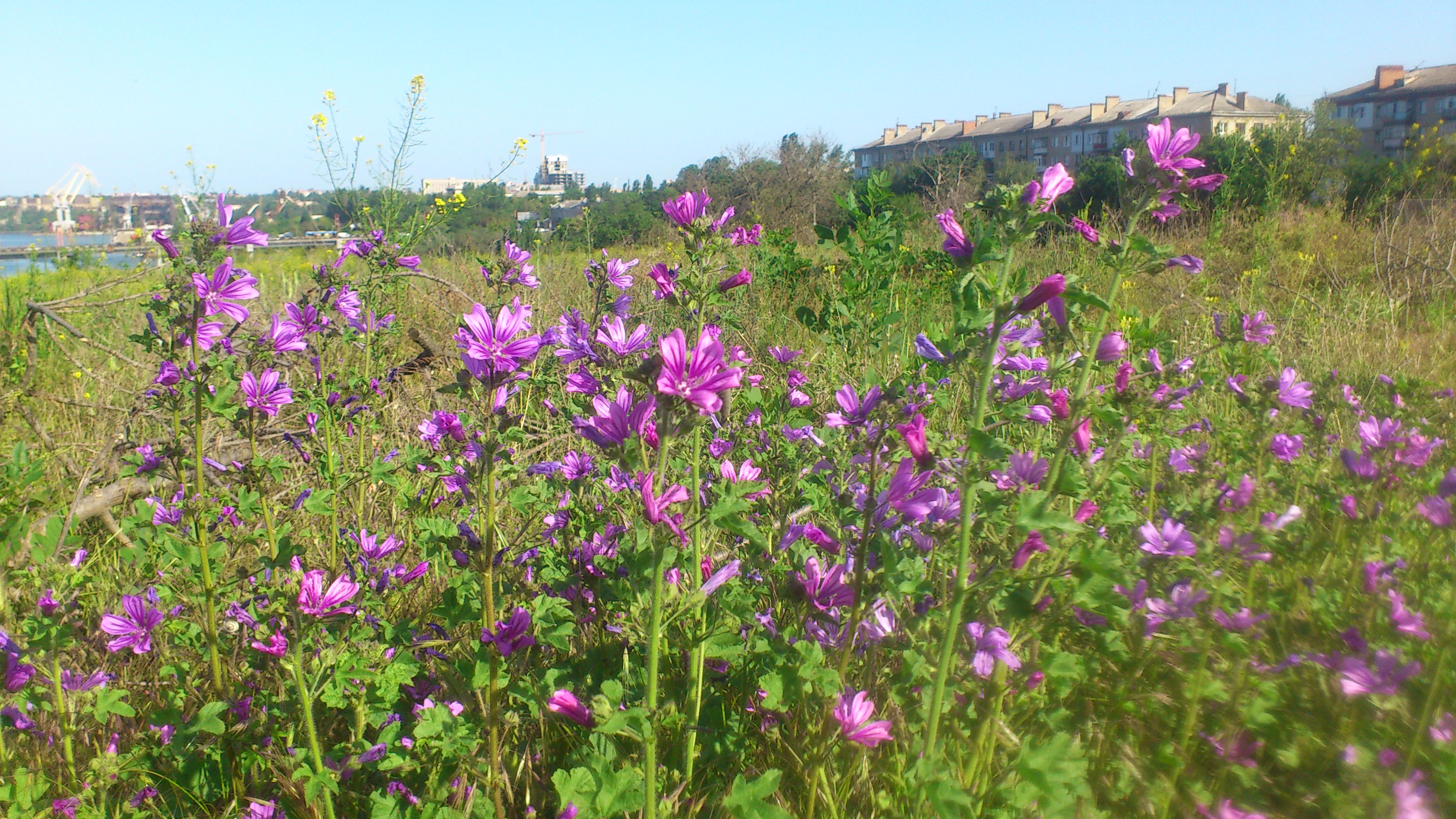
Wild flowers in the Wild Garden

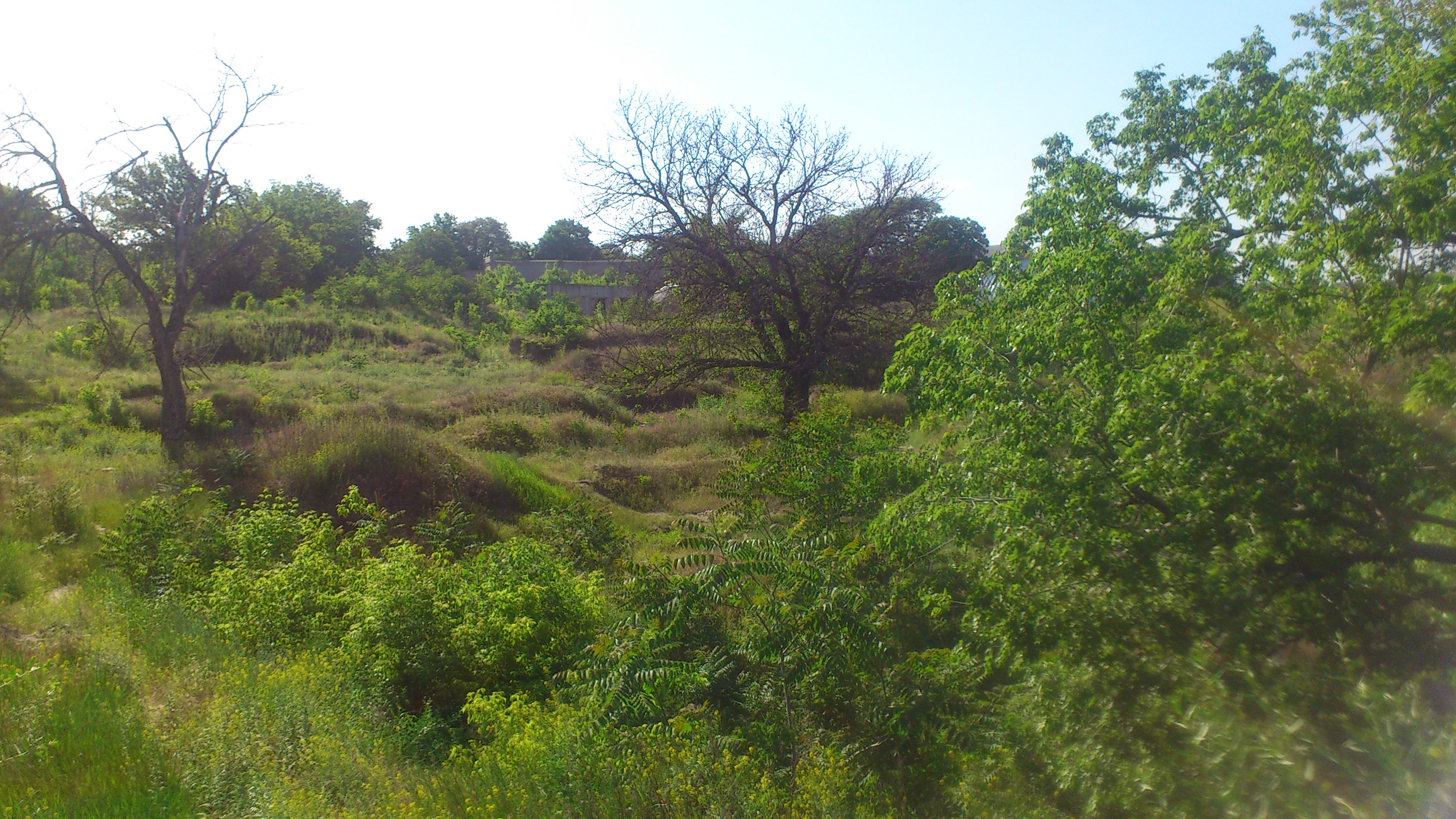
Dykyi Sad

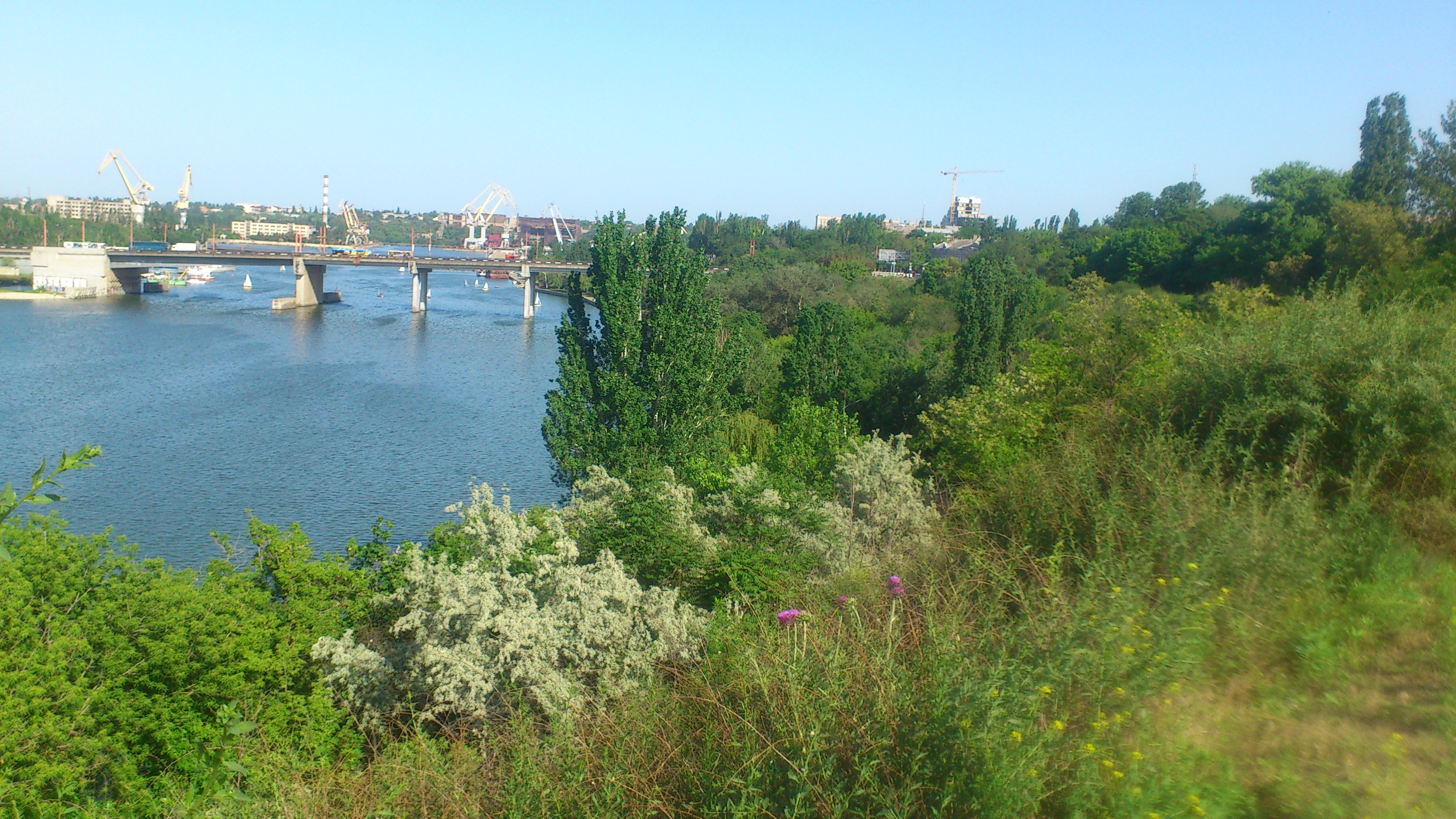
View from Dykyi Sad on Ingul bridge

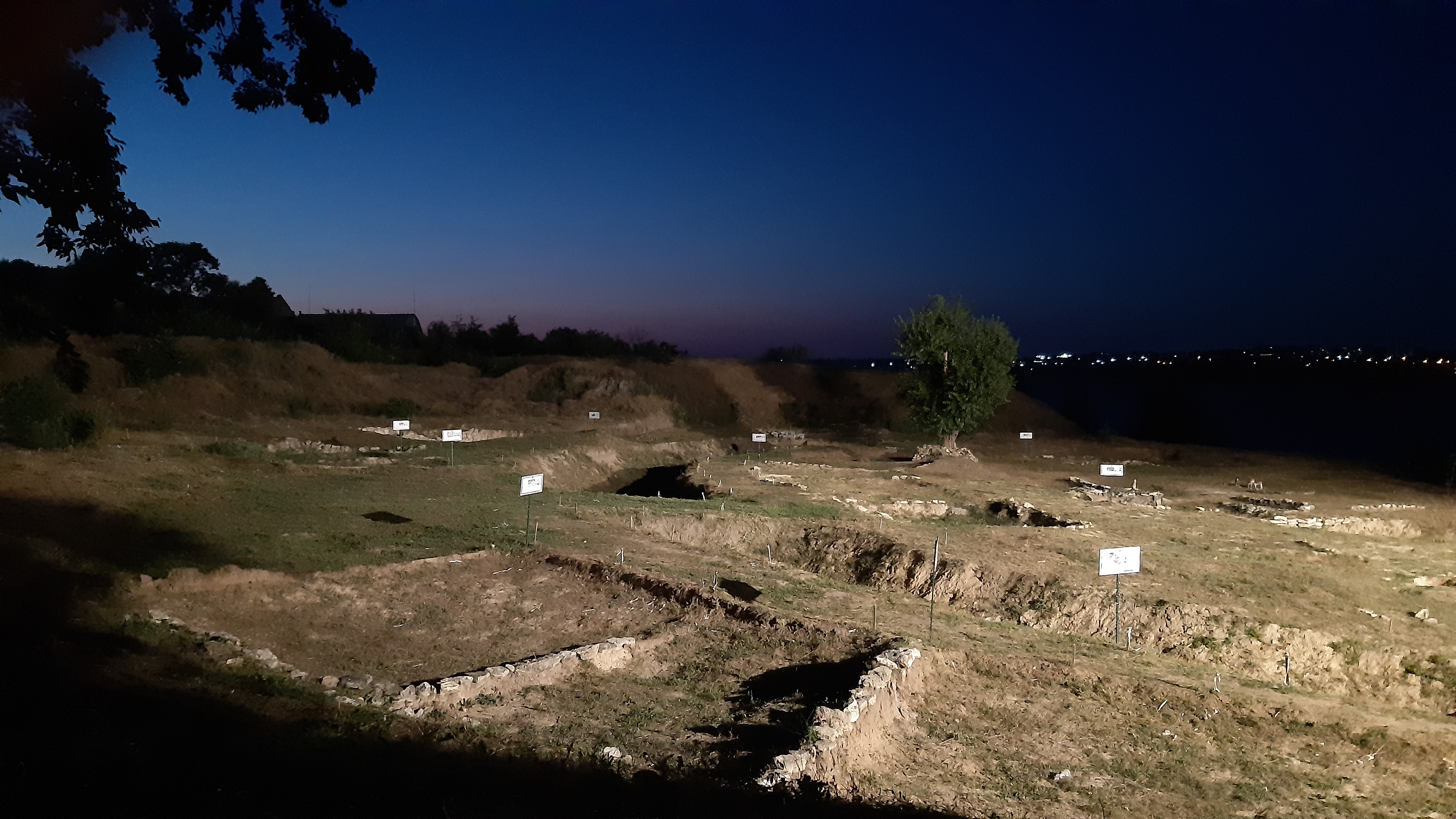
Excavation of the Dykyi Sad settlement at night in August 2021
