= Fietz =

Fietz is a German surname. Notable people with the surname include:

- Michael Fietz (born 1967), German long-distance runner
- Siegfried Fietz (born 1946), German singer-songwriter, composer, music producer, and sculptor

== See also ==
- Fitz
- Lietz
