= Lietz =

Lietz is a German surname.

Notable people with this surname include:

- Arne Lietz (born 1976), German politician
- Bruno Lietz (1925-2005), German politician
- Georg Lietz, German canoer
- Hermann Lietz (1868-1919), German theologian
- Mattie Lietz (1893-1956), American painter
- Richard Lietz (born 1983), Austrian driver
