= Gáva-Holigrady culture =

Archaeological culture

- Geographical range: Hungary, Slovakia, Romania, Moldova, Ukraine
- Period: Bronze Age, Iron Age
- Dates: 13th century - 9th century BC
- Preceded by: Vatya culture, Noua-Sabatinovka culture
- Followed by: Hallstatt culture, Thracians, Thraco-Cimmerians

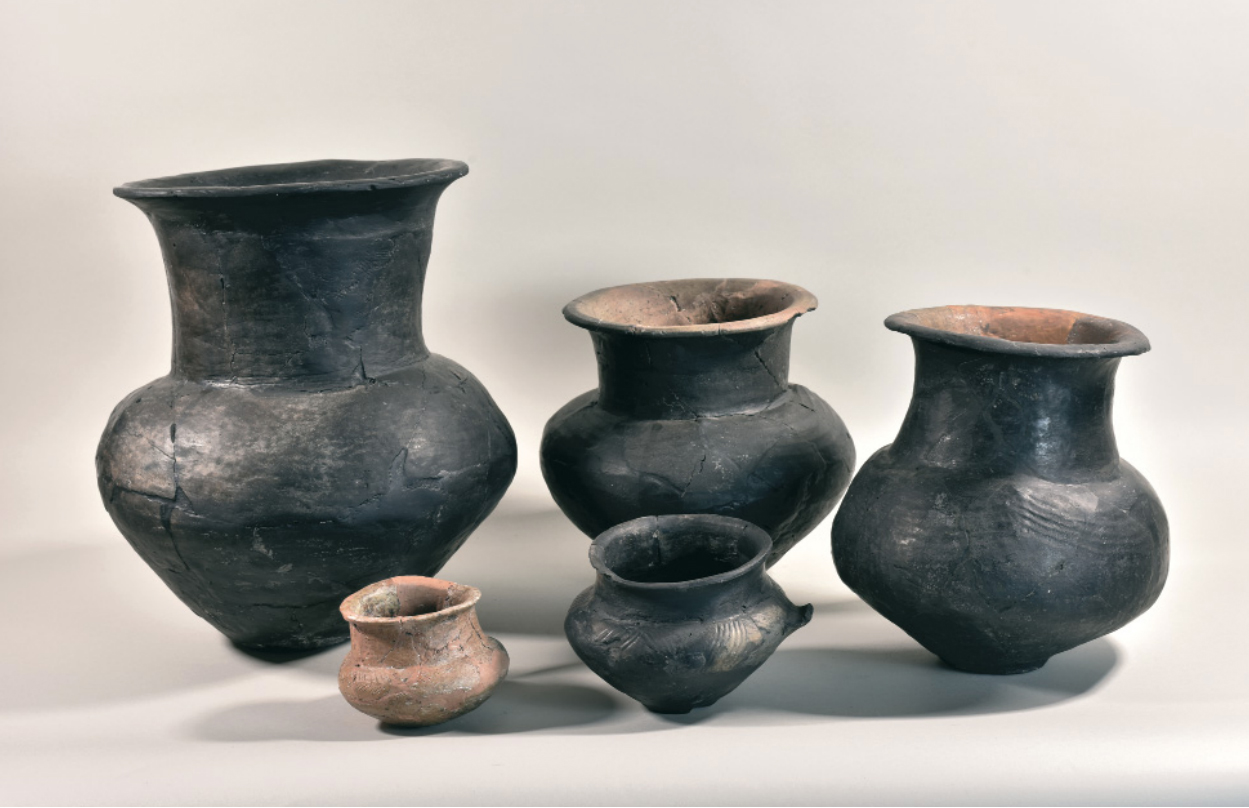
Gava culture pottery from the Teleac hillfort, Romania.

The Gáva-Holigrady culture was a late Bronze Age culture of Eastern Slovakia, Western Ukraine (Zakarpats'ka Oblast and Dnister river basin), Northwestern Romania, Moldova, and Northeastern Hungary.

It is considered a subtype of the Urnfield culture.

Gava-Holigrady culture is named after an archaeological settlement Gava in northeastern Hungary and an archaeological site Holigrady (Голігради) in Ukrainian Ternopil Oblast.

In Slovakia, the culture originated in the early 12th century BC.

Gáva people lived in settlements and hillforts that they built in the Slovak and Transylvanian uplands.

Gava-Holigrad people are considered to be of Thracian ethnicity.

== Gallery ==
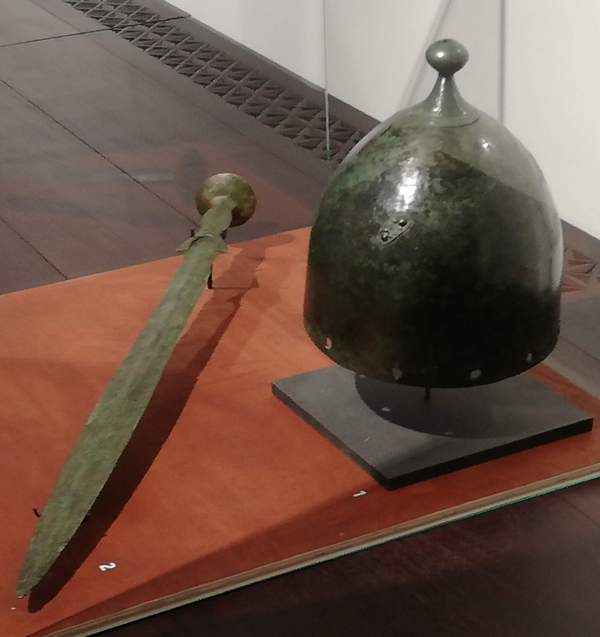
Bronze helmet and sword from Romania

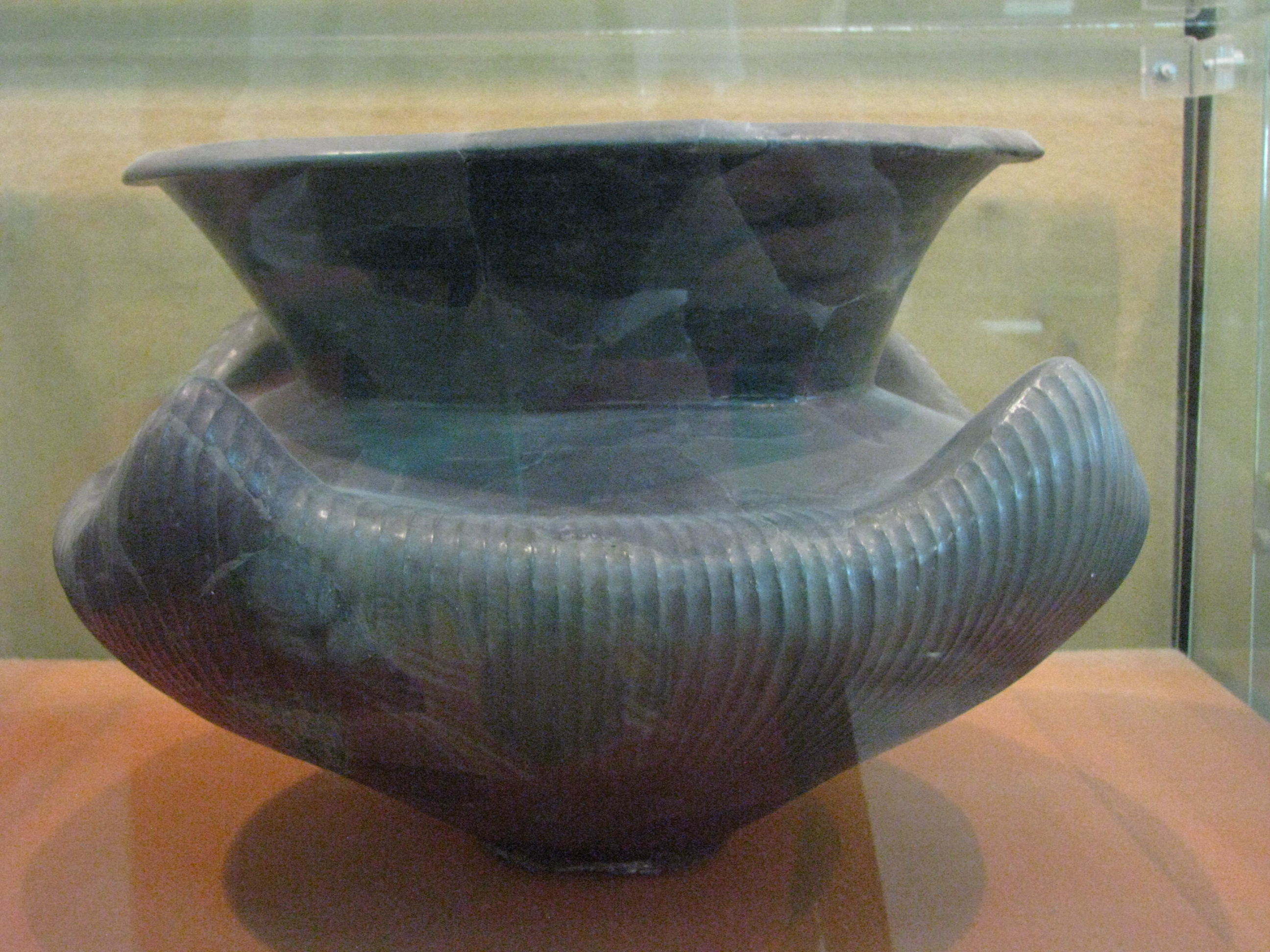
Ceramic vessel from the Teleac hillfort, Romania

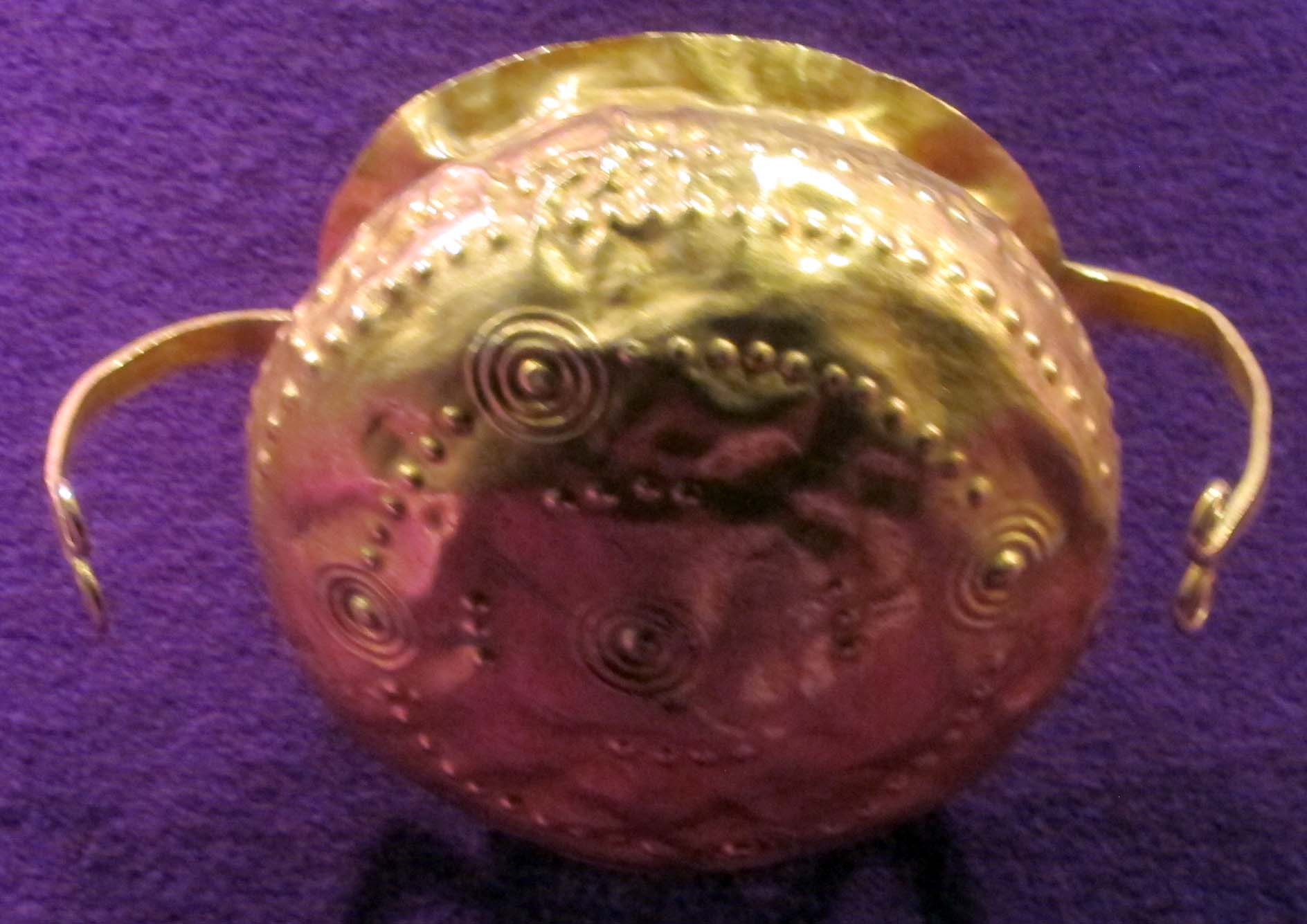
Gold vessel from Biia, Romania, 12th century BC

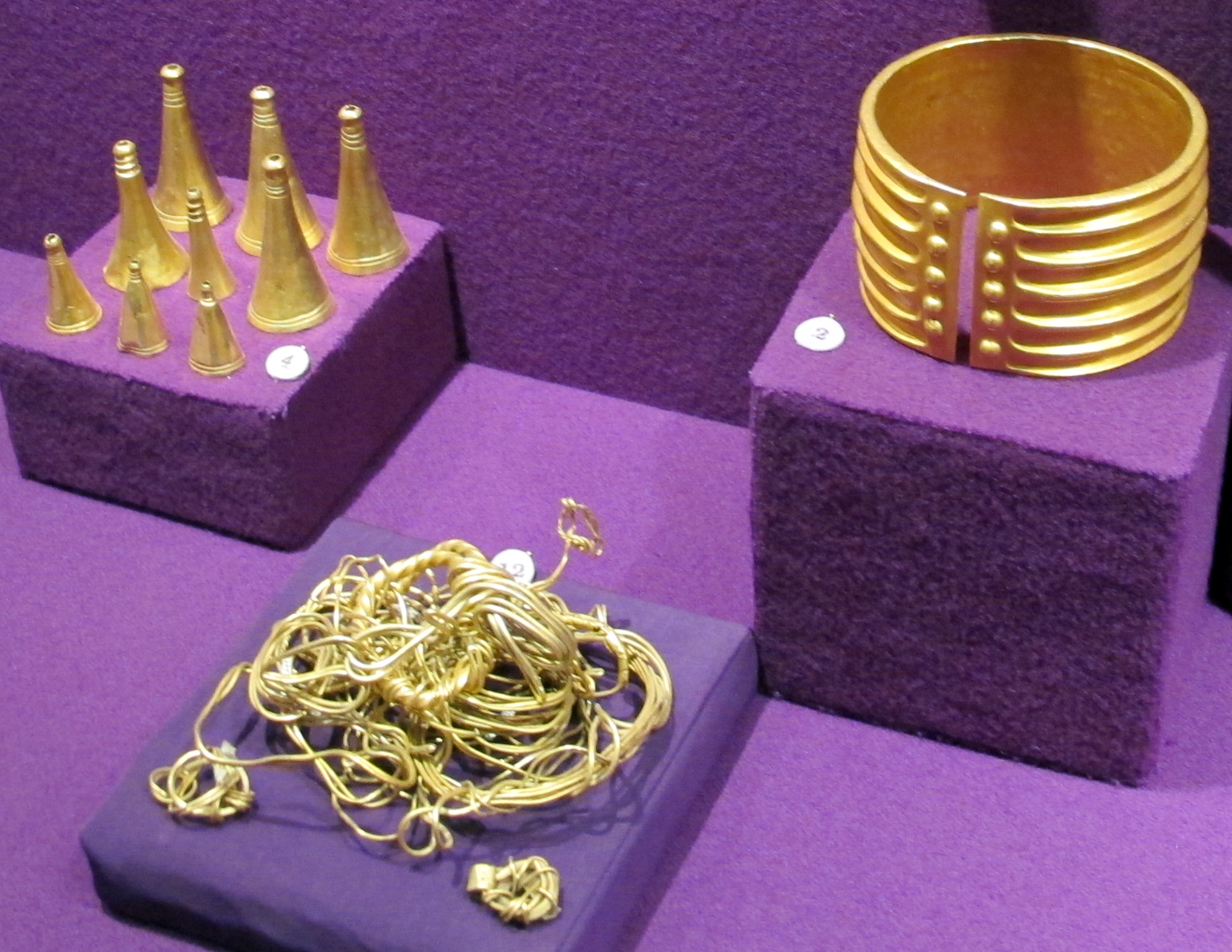
Hinova treasure, Romania,12th century BC

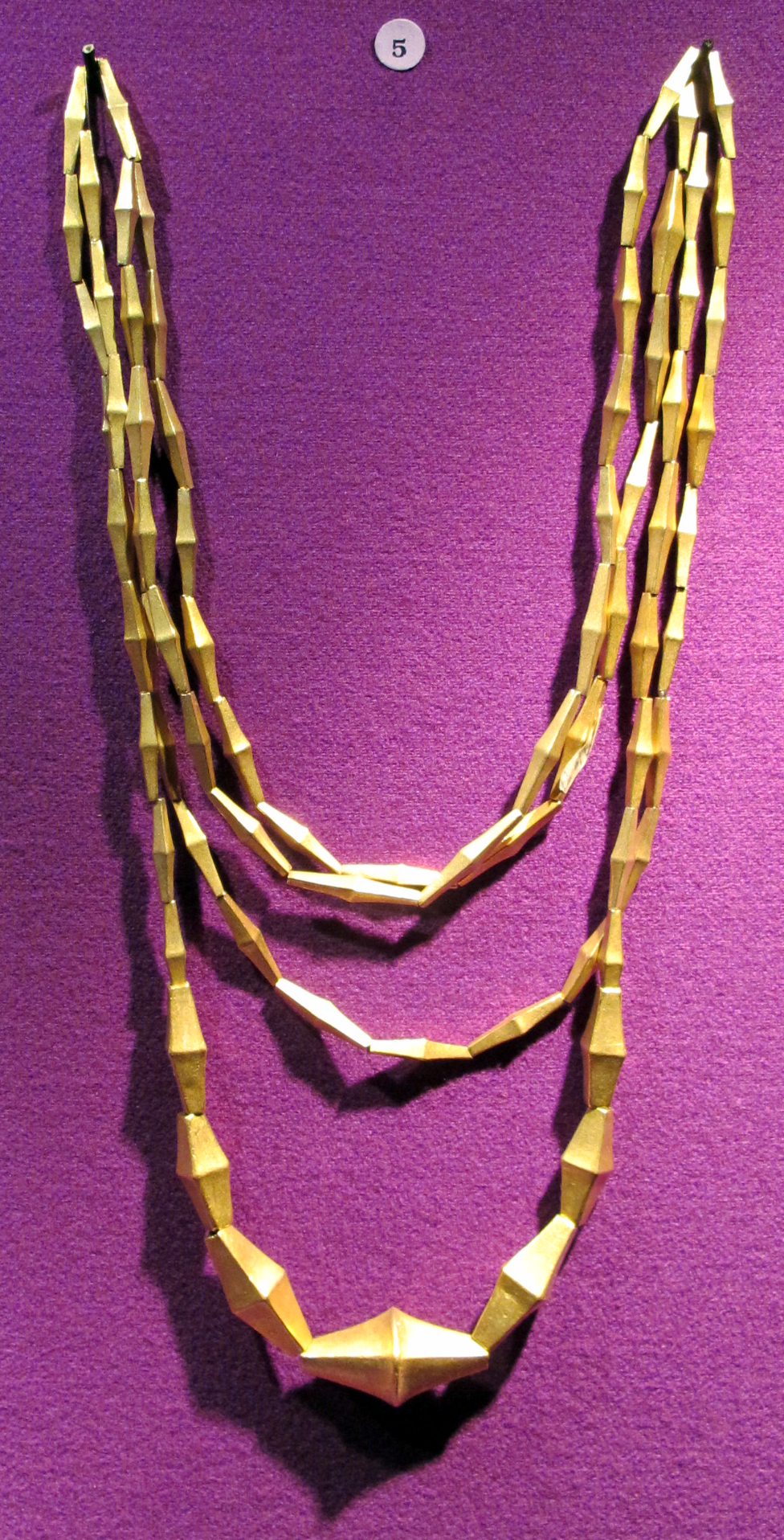
Hinova treasure, Romania,12th century BC

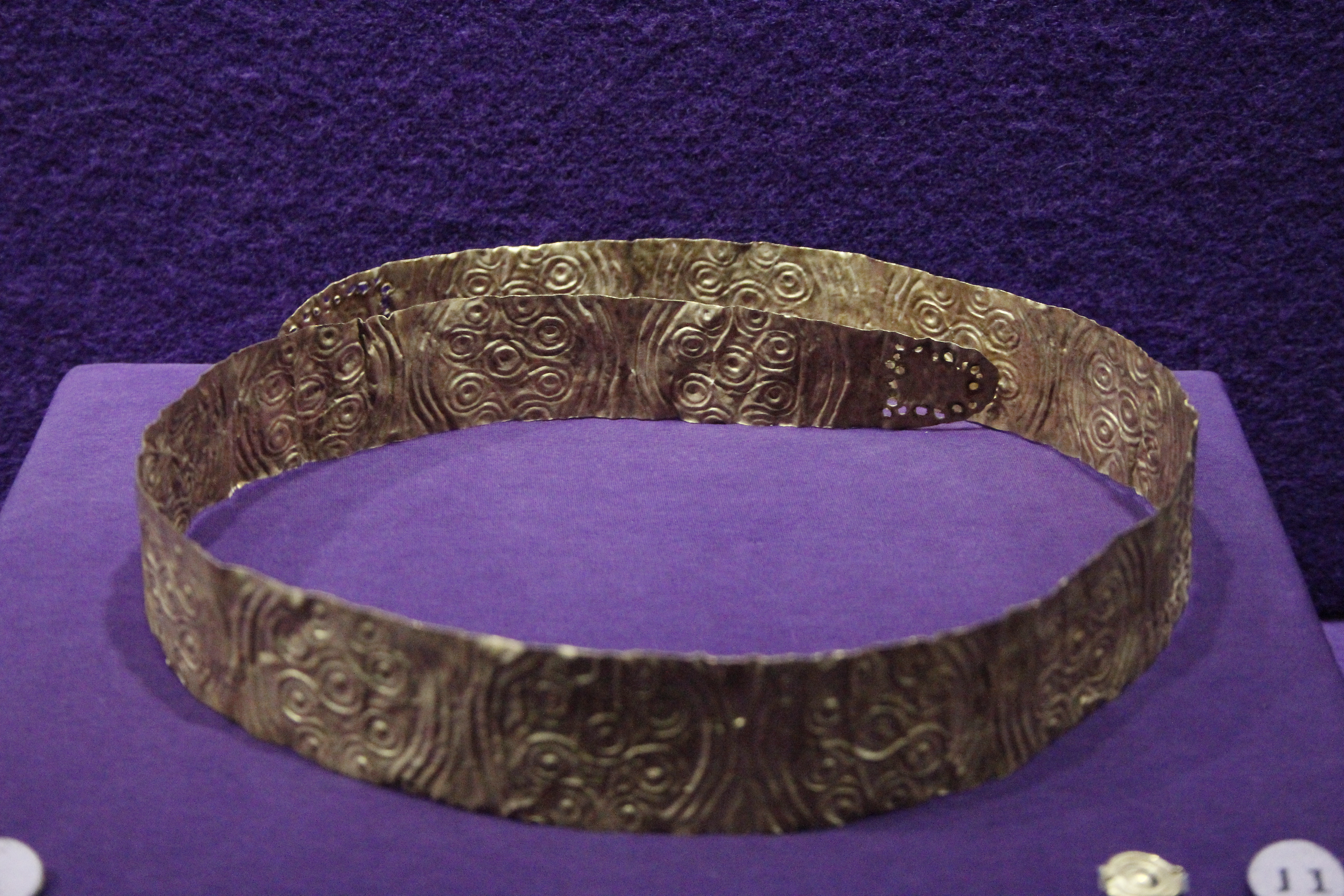
Gold diadem, Hinova treasure

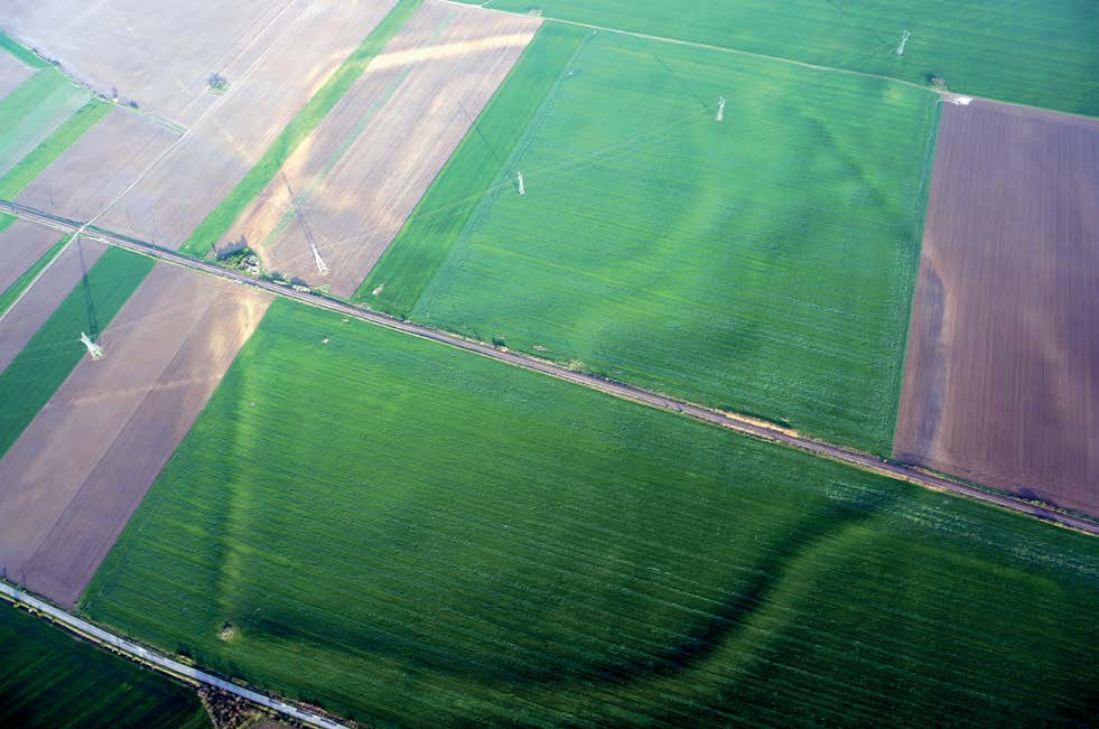
Remains of the Sântana mega-fort, Romania

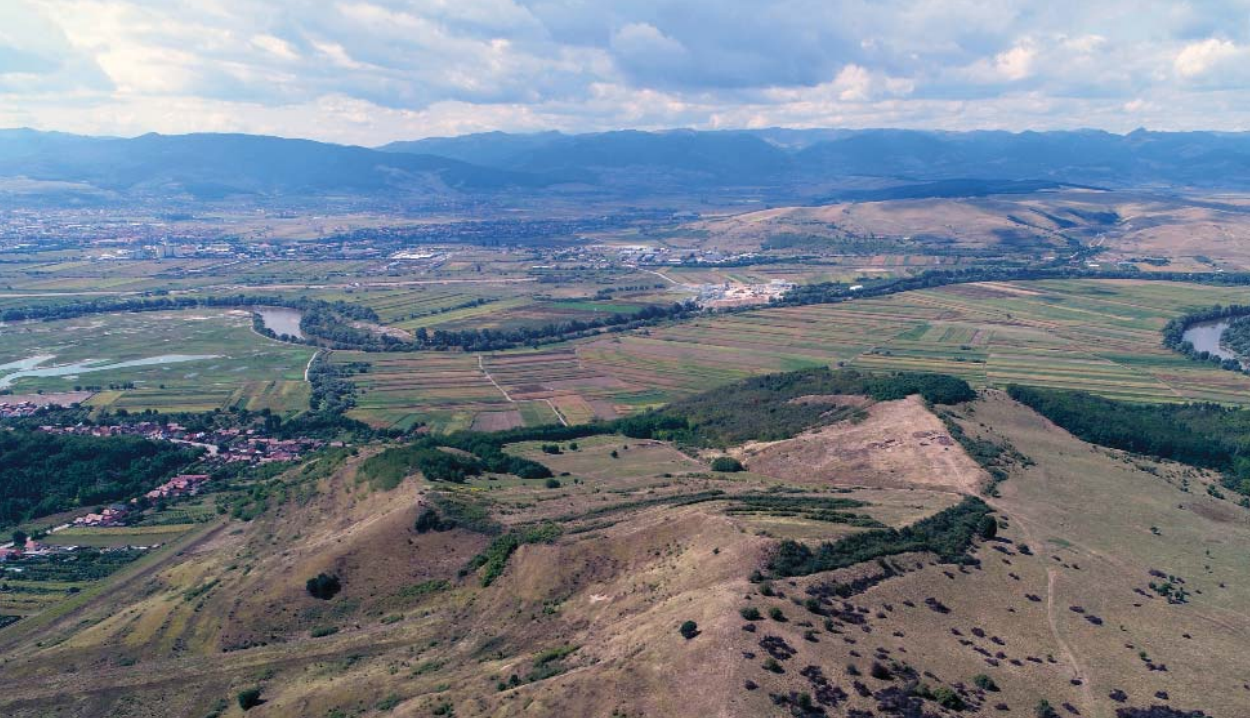
Site of the Teleac hillfort, Romania

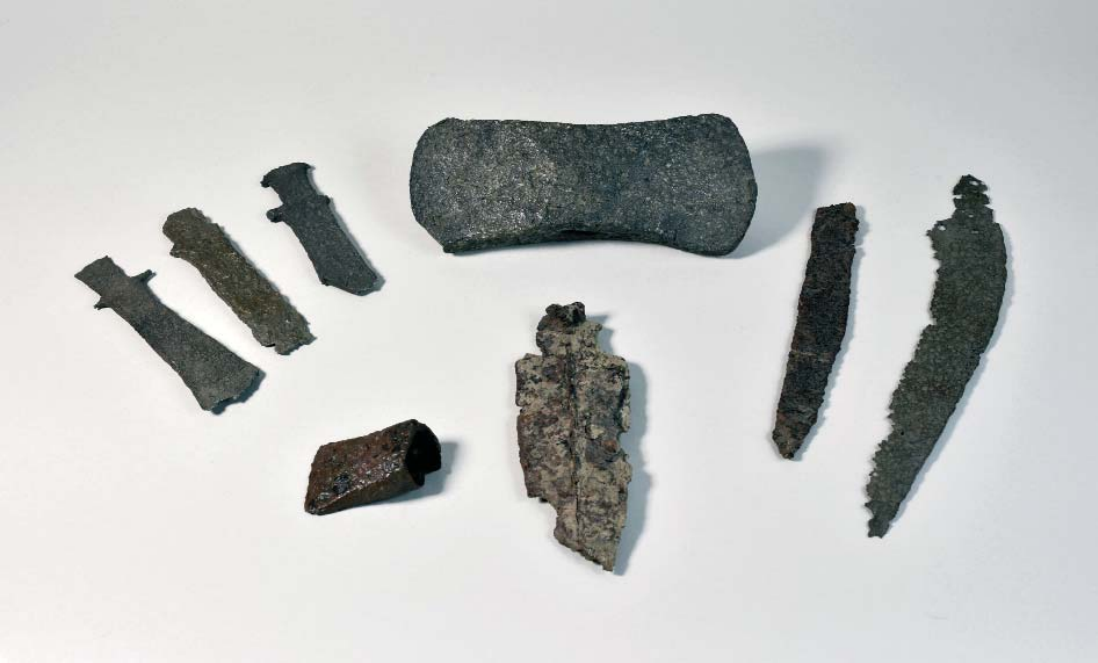
Iron artefacts from Teleac, 10th century BC

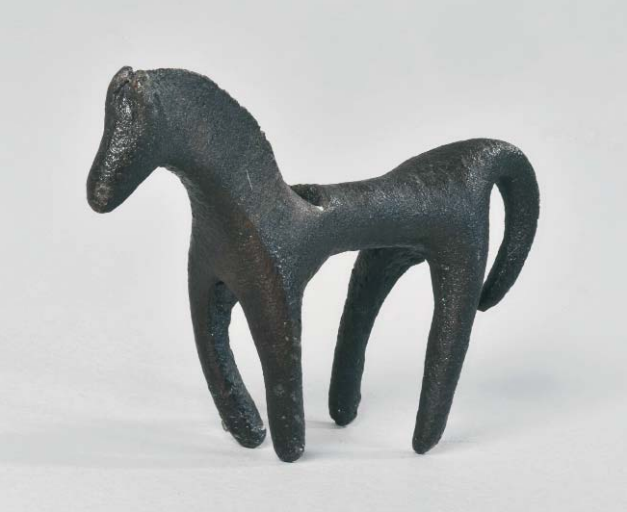
Bronze horse figurine from Teleac, c. 11th century BC

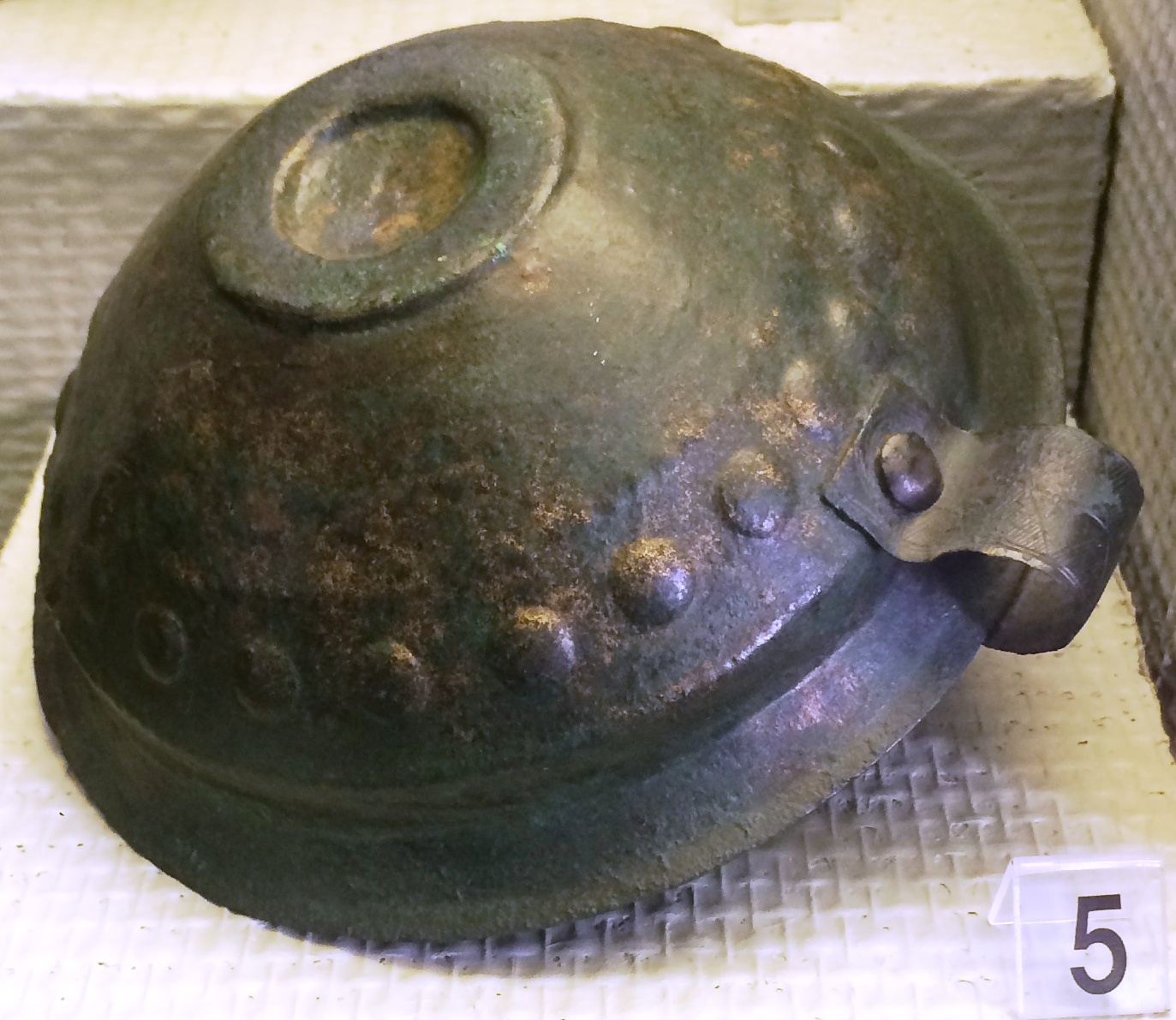
Bronze cup, Hungary

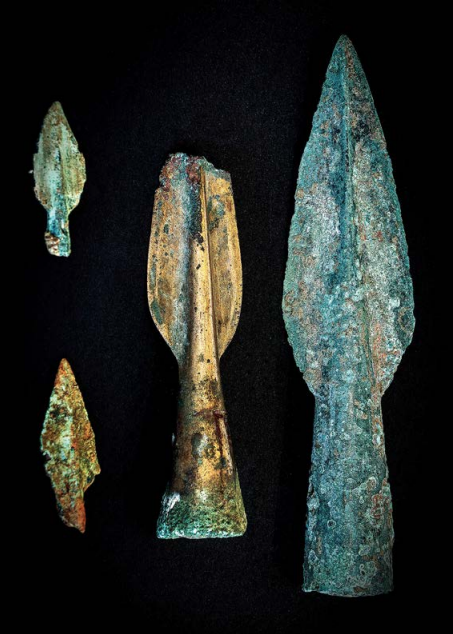
Spearheads and arrowheads from Sântana, Romania

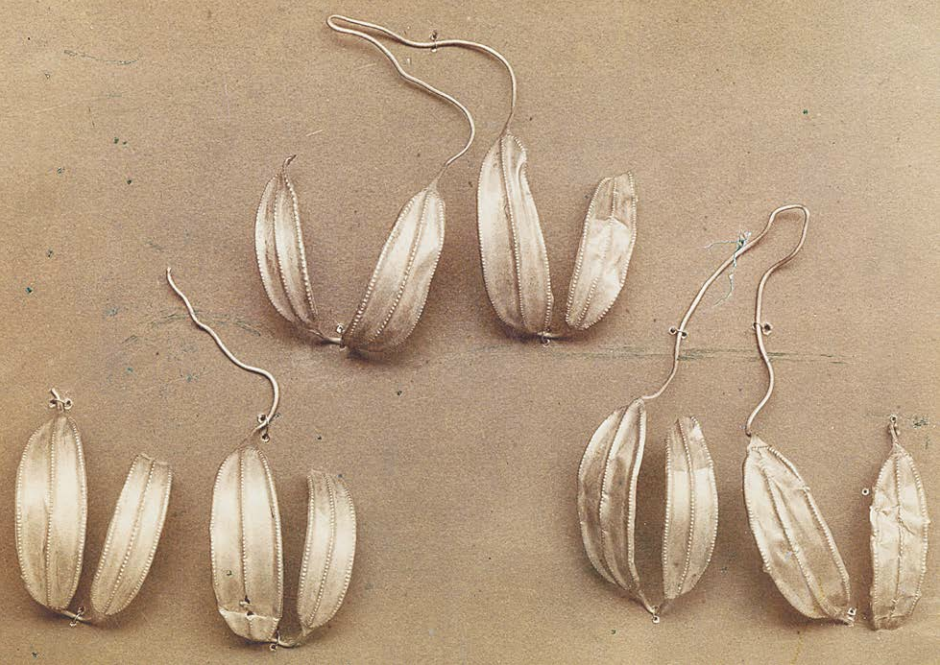
Gold jewellery from Sântana, Romania

== Lăpuș Group ==
The Lăpuș Group is considered to be a Romanian counterpart of the Gáva-Holigrady culture. It belongs to the North Romanian Suciu de Sus culture, which is part of the broader Urnfield culture.

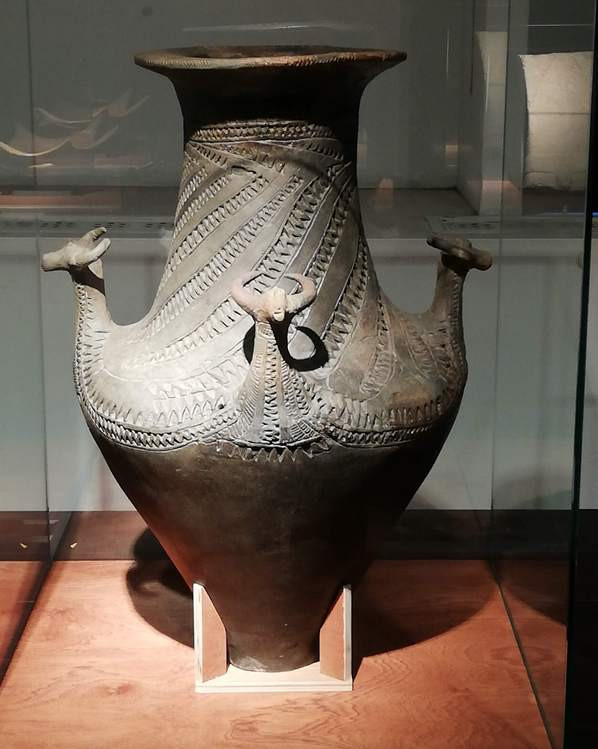

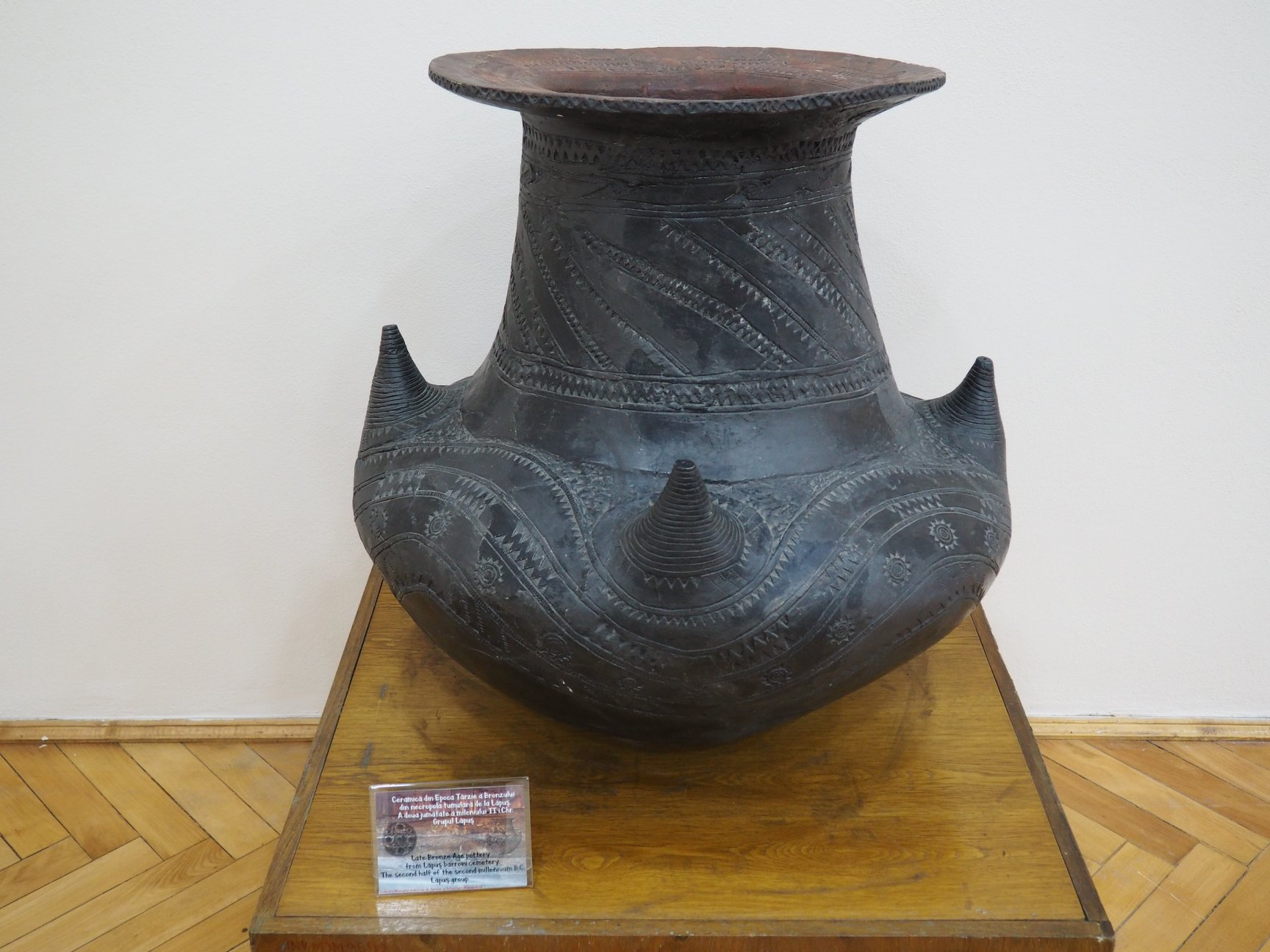
Lăpuș Group pottery, 13th century BC.

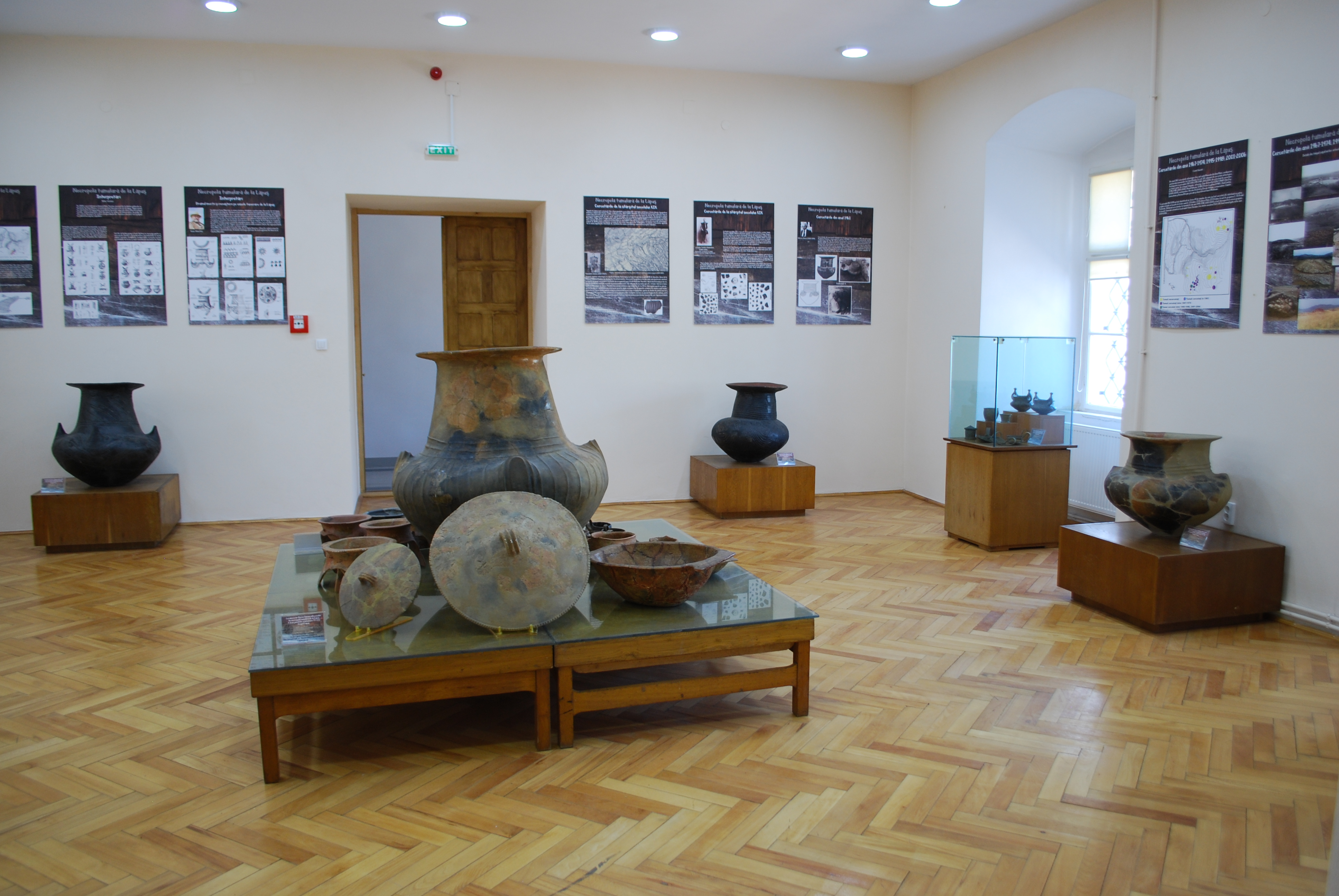

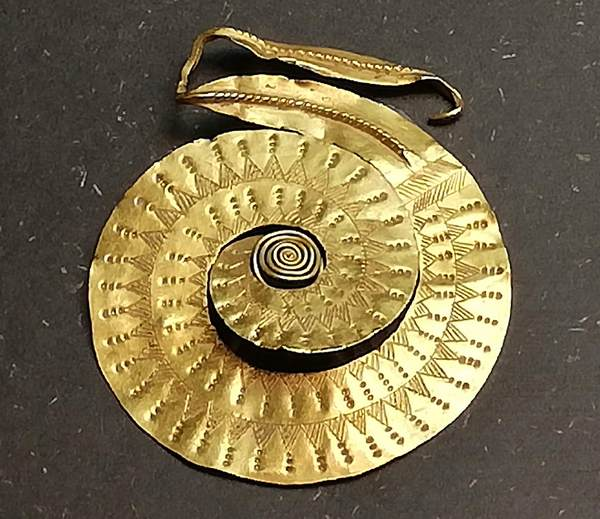
Sarasău hoard gold, Romania, 1300-1200 BC

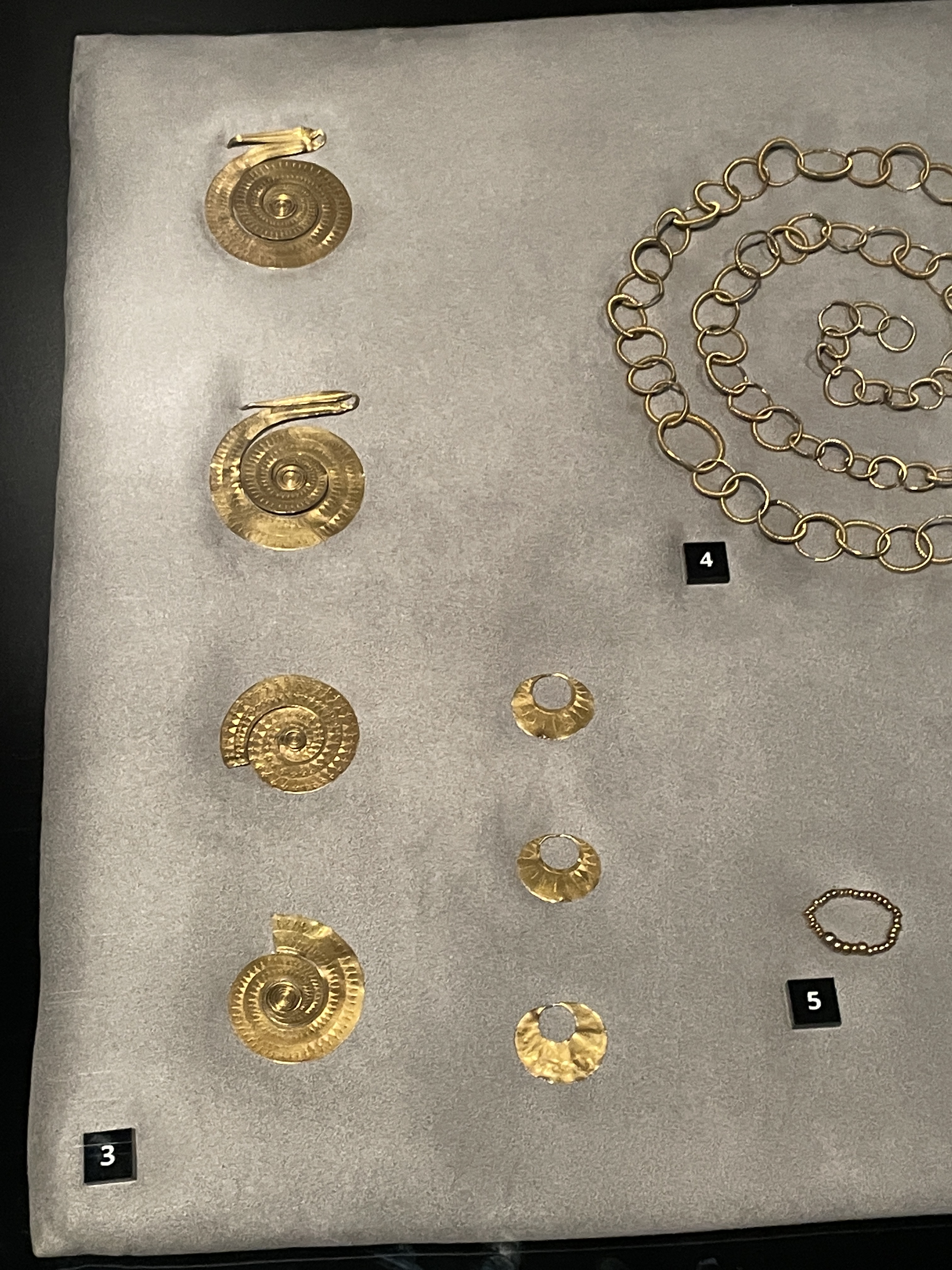
Gold objects from the Sarasău hoard, Romania

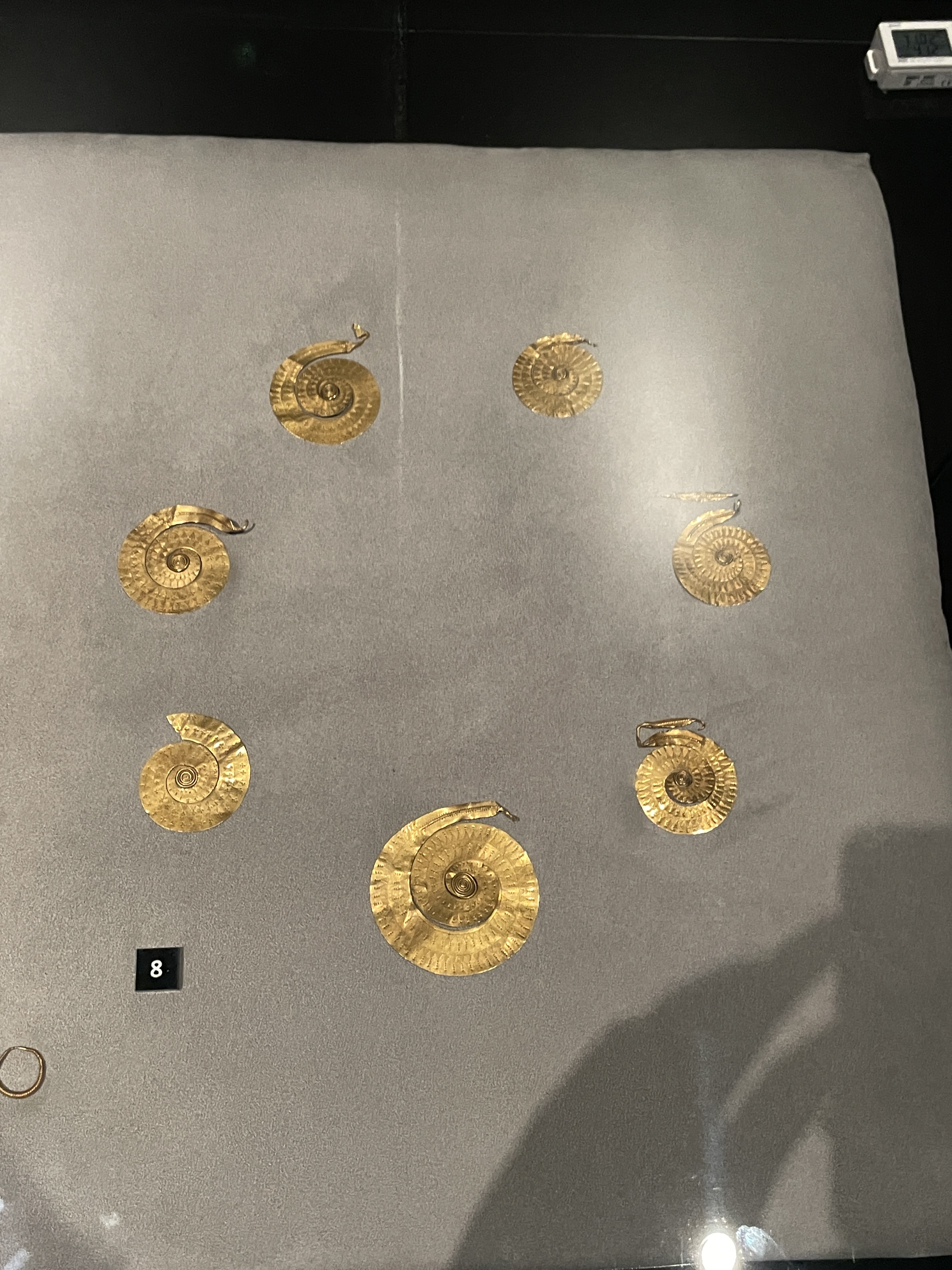
Gold objects from the Sarasău hoard
