= Noua-Sabatinovka-Coslogeni complex =

Bronze Age cultural complex

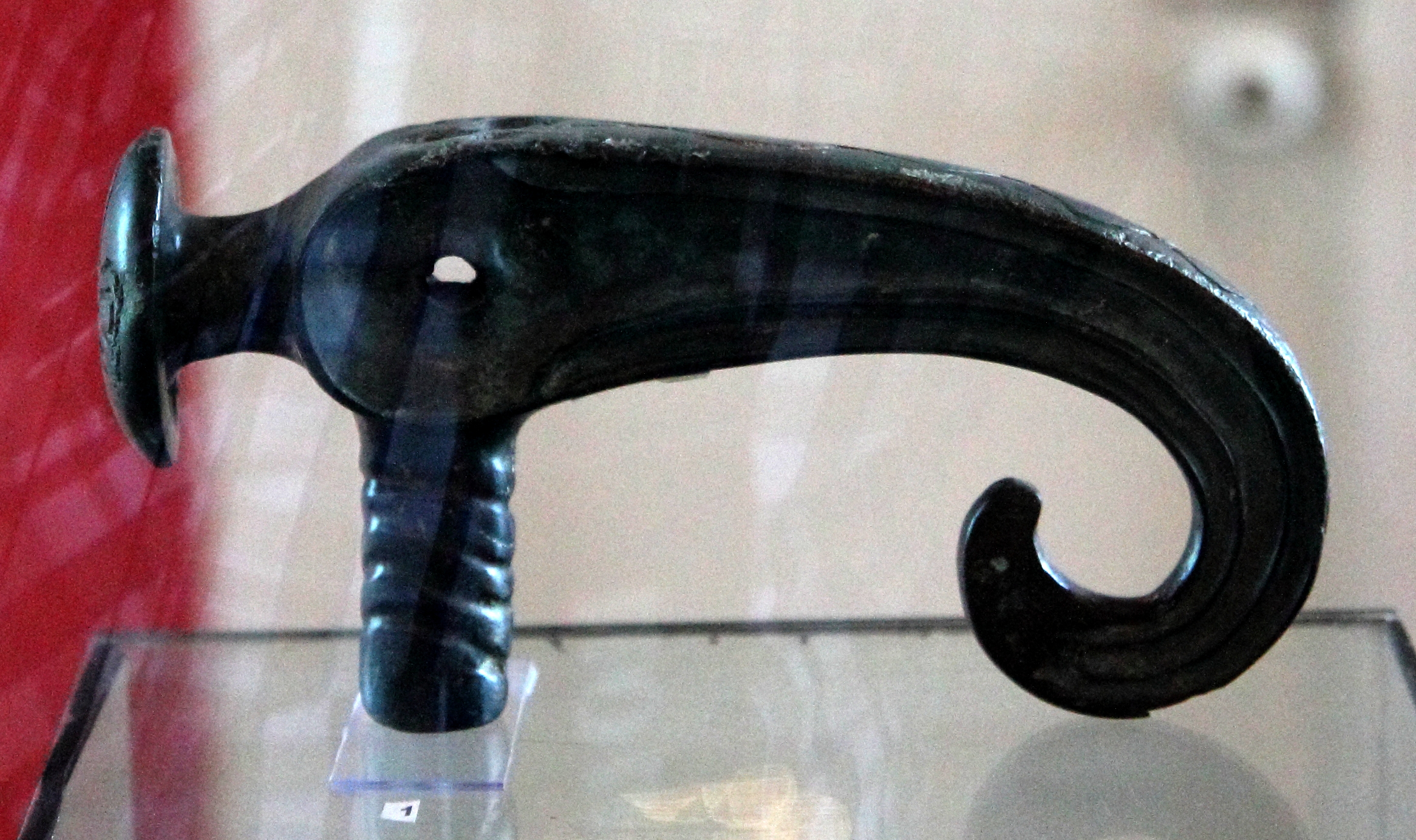
- Geographical range: Ukraine, Moldova, Romania
- Period: Bronze Age
- Dates: 16th century - 11th century BC
- Preceded by: Multi-cordoned ware culture, Srubnaya culture, Monteoru culture, Wietenberg culture, Tei culture
- Followed by: Urnfield culture, Gava culture, Bilozerka culture

The Noua-Sabatinovka-Coslogeni complex (Note: Ukrainian: Ноа-Сабатинівська-Кослодженьська культурна спільність, romanized: Noa-Sabatynivsjka-Koslodzhenjsjka kuljturna spiljnistj, lit. 'Noua-Sabatynivka-Coslogeni cultural circle'.) was a late Bronze Age archaeological cultural complex located in Ukraine, Moldova and Romania, dating from the 16th to 11th centuries BC, consisting of the closely related Noua, Sabatinovka (Sabatynivka) and Coslogeni cultures.

== Characteristics ==
Representatives of the Noua-Sabatinovka-Coslogeni complex were engaged in agriculture and cattle breeding.

== Origin ==
The Sabatinovka culture was formed on the basis of the Multi-Cordon Ware culture, there is also the influence of the Srubnaya culture and Monteoru. Noua culture and Coslogeni were formed as a result of the fusion of local cultures (Monteoru, Tei and Wietenbrg cultures) with the arriving carriers of the Sabatinovka culture. The relationship of the archaeological complex as part of the Srubnaya culture is a subject of debate.

== Successors ==
Bilozerka culture was the successor of the Sabatinovka culture.

Noua culture and Coslogeni was absorbed by Urnfield culture (Gava culture)

== Ethnicity ==
Noua culture and Coslogeni were of Thracian origin, while Sabatinovka culture were of Iranian or Thracian origin.

== Gallery ==
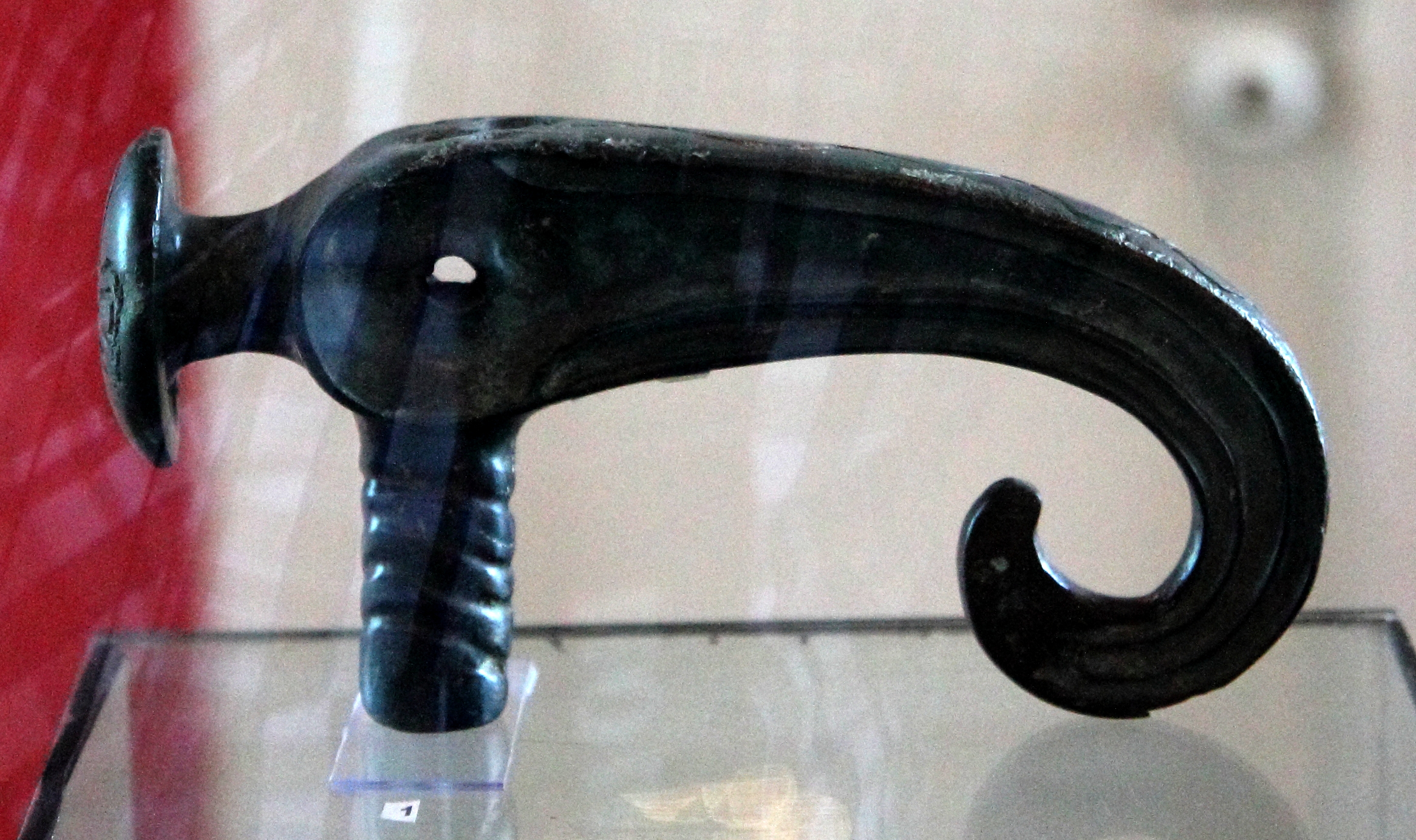
Noua-Sabatinovka-Coslogeni bronze sceptre, Moldova.

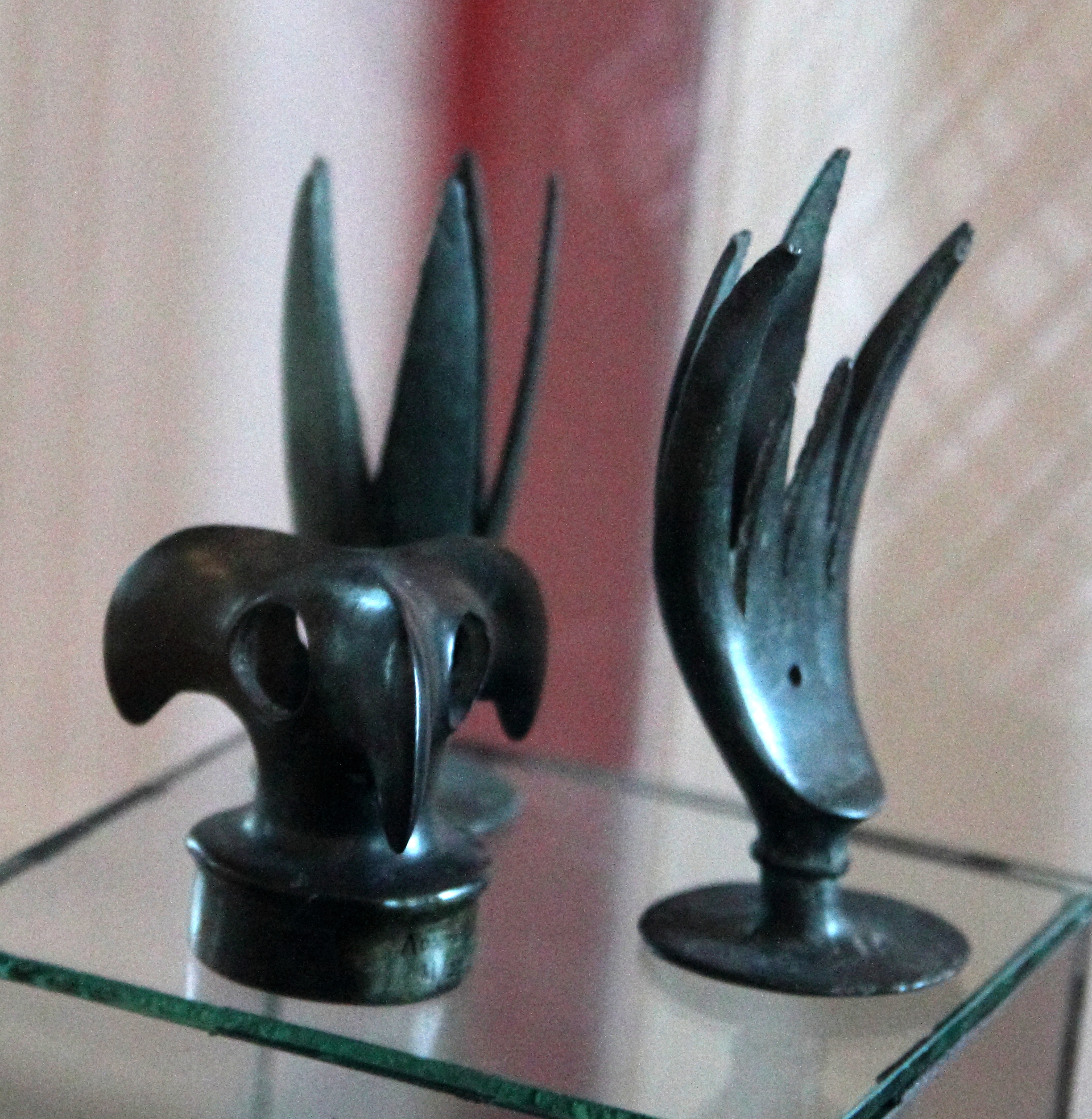
Noua-Sabatinovka-Coslogeni bronze artefacts, Moldova

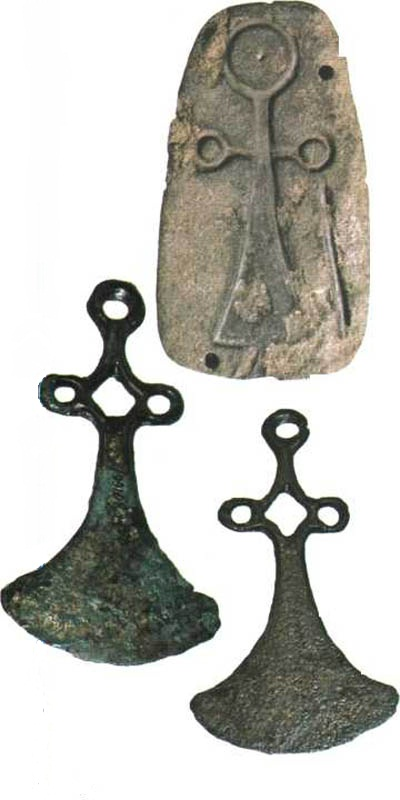
Bronze artefacts and casting mould, Ukraine

== Genetics ==
=== Haplogroups ===
Noua culture and Sabatinovka culture had a male haplogroup R1a, from female haplogroups were present J1, U8a1a1, U2e1b.

=== Autosomal DNA ===
The Noua and Sabatinovka cultures have a genetically similar origin, which distinguishes the Noua culture from its predecessor Monteoru, which was predominantly of Neolithic origin.

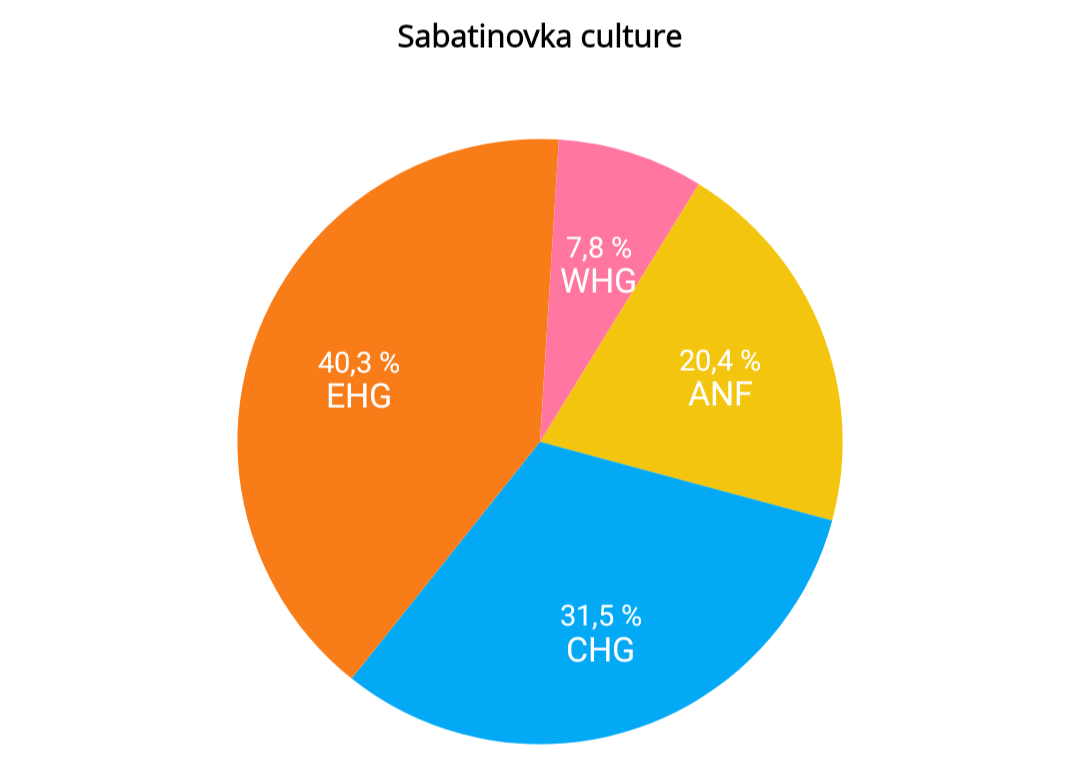
Autosomal DNA Sabatinovka culture

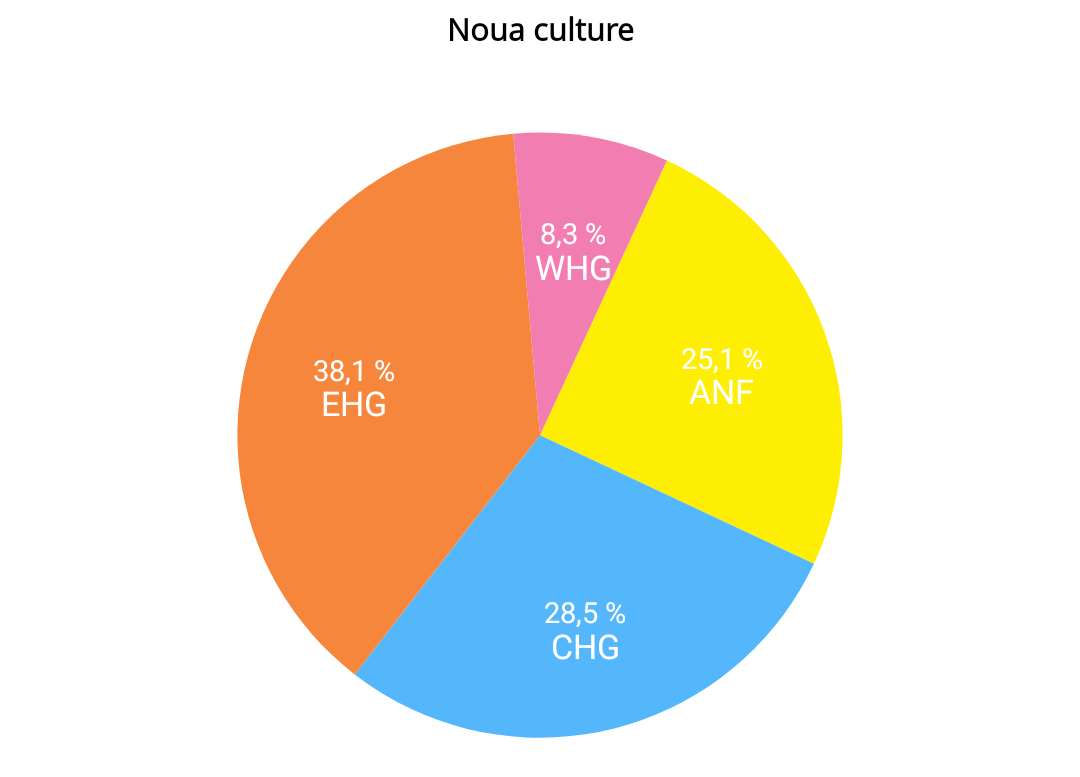
Autosomal DNA Noua Culture

== See also ==
- Prehistory of Transylvania
- Bronze Age in Romania
- Urnfield culture
- Gava culture
