= Bilozerka culture =

Bronze age culture in Eastern Europe

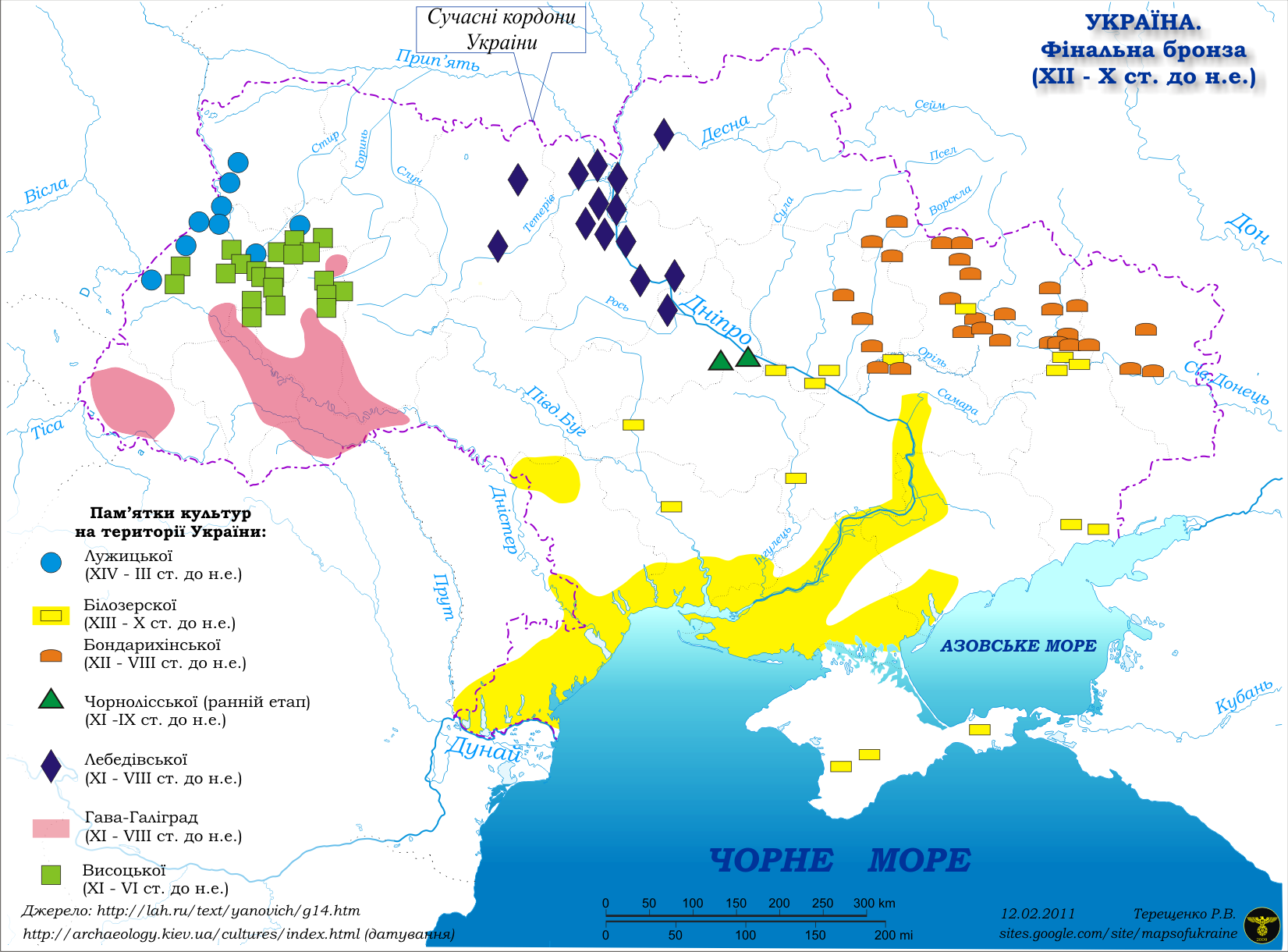
- Bilozerka culture
- Geographical range: Ukraine, Moldova
- Period: Bronze Age
- Dates: 12th century - 10th century BCE
- Preceded by: Srubnaya culture, Noua-Sabatinovka culture
- Followed by: Belogrudov culture, Chernogorovka-Novocherkassk complex, Scythians

The Bilozerka culture (Ukrainian: Білозерська культура) or Belozerka culture (Russian: Белозерская культура) was a Late Bronze Age archaeological culture of the later (12th–10th centuries BCE) which replaced the Srubnaya culture on the steppes of Ukraine and Moldova. It is named after the Bilozerka river eastuary in southern Ukraine. There are also finds near the lower Don and in Kuban and Crimea. It was identified as an independent archaeological culture in the 1980s.

== Discoveries ==
The remains consist of settlements, graves, workshops, treasures, and scattered other finds. The settlements consist of pit-houses, semi–pit-houses, and houses on flat ground with stone foundations, while the graves are tumuli and grave fields. The dead were buried on a wooden floor in a rectangular pit in the fetal position, usually lying on one side, with the head oriented toward the south. Grave goods consisted of one or two wooden vessels, rarely metallic objects.

== Historical context ==
The culture is associated with the Cimmerians, and it was replaced by the Belogrudov culture and later the Scythians.
