= Fetishism =

Human attribution of special powers or value to an object

Fetishism is a category of contemporary scholarly discourse first employed to describe religious and cross-cultural hierarchy. It refers to the asymmetrical attribution of values and power to material objects, particularly attributions that anticipate other, sometimes opposing, claims of value, agency, or social relationships. In this theoretical frame, a fetish is an object believed to have supernatural powers, or in particular, a human-made object that has power over others. According to intellectual historian William Pietz, the idea of fetishism in the study of religion traversed a diverse range of meanings and applications since its coinage in the early colonial period.

== Etymology ==
The word fetish (Note: Formerly also spelled fetich.) derives from the French fétiche, which comes from the Portuguese feitiço or fetisso ("spell"), which in turn derives from a Latin root. However, there is some disagreement regarding which Latin root. William Pietz points to facere ("to make"). On the other hand, philosopher Charles De Brosses, who is cited as the source of the term "fetishism," traces the etymology to the various Latin roots fatum, fanum, and fari. Some scholars suggest that "the instability in its linguistic origins is symptomatic of the concept's ambivalence, its lack of distinction between that which is enchanted and that which is fabricated or artificial."

== Historiography ==
William Pietz, who, in 1994, conducted an extensive ethno-historical study of the fetish, argues that the term originated in the coast of West Africa during the sixteenth and seventeenth centuries. Pietz distinguishes between, on the one hand, actual African objects that may be called fetishes in Europe, together with the indigenous theories of them, and on the other hand, "fetish", an idea about a kind of object, to which the term above applies.

Initially, the Portuguese developed the concept of the fetish to refer to the objects used in religious practices by West African natives. The contemporary Portuguese feitiço may refer to more neutral terms such as charm, enchantment, or abracadabra, or more potentially offensive terms such as juju, witchcraft, witchery, conjuration or bewitchment. The wide range of objects referred to as fetishes led to a dilution of the term’s meaning. Often, objects were classified as fetishes indiscriminately because, from a European perspective, they did not fit into any other category.

Thus, the term fetish has evolved from an idiom used to describe a type of object created in the interaction between European travelers and Native West Africans in the early modern period to an analytical term that played a central role in the perception and study of non-Western material culture in general and African material culture in particular.

According to Pietz, the concept of "fetish" emerged from the encounter between Europeans and Africans in a very specific historical context and in response to African material culture.

He begins his thesis with an introduction to the complex history of the word:

My argument, then, is that the fetish could originate only in conjunction with the emergent articulation of the ideology of the commodity form that defined itself within and against the social values and religious ideologies of two radically different types of noncapitalist society, as they encountered each other in an ongoing cross-cultural situation. This process is indicated in the history of the word itself as it developed from the late medieval Portuguese feitiço, to the sixteenth-century pidgin Fetisso on the African coast, to various northern European versions of the word via the 1602 text of the Dutchman Pieter de Marees... The fetish, then, not only originated from, but remains specific to, the problem of the social value of material objects as revealed in situations formed by the encounter of radically heterogeneous social systems, and a study of the history of the idea of the fetish may be guided by identifying those themes that persist throughout the various discourses and disciplines that have appropriated the term.

Modern scholarship concludes that colonial powers, including the Portuguese, Dutch, and British, among others, deployed the category of the fetish to critique colonized peoples' interactions with material objects, thereby constructing European rationality against so-called "primitive" superstition. In short, colonizers constructed a link between material culture and superstition.

This pattern of demonized fetishism continued into the modern period. The concept was popularized in Europe circa 1760, when Charles de Brosses used it in comparing West African religion to the magical aspects of ancient Egyptian religion. Later, Auguste Comte employed the concept in his theory of the evolution of religion, wherein he posited fetishism as the earliest (most primitive) stage, followed by polytheism and monotheism. However, ethnography and anthropology would classify some artifacts of polytheistic and monotheistic religions as fetishes.

The eighteenth-century intellectuals who articulated the theory of fetishism encountered this notion in such popular voyage collections as Ramusio's Viaggio e Navigazioni (1550), de Bry's India Orientalis (1597), Purchas's Hakluytus Posthumus (1625), Churchill's Collection of Voyages and Travels (1732), Astley's A New General Collection of Voyages and Travels (1746), and Prevost's Histoire generale des voyages (1748).

The theory of fetishism was articulated at the end of the eighteenth century by G. W. F. Hegel in Lectures on the Philosophy of History. According to Hegel, Africans were incapable of abstract thought, their ideas and actions were governed by impulse, and therefore a fetish object could be anything that then was arbitrarily imbued with "imaginary powers".

== Practice ==
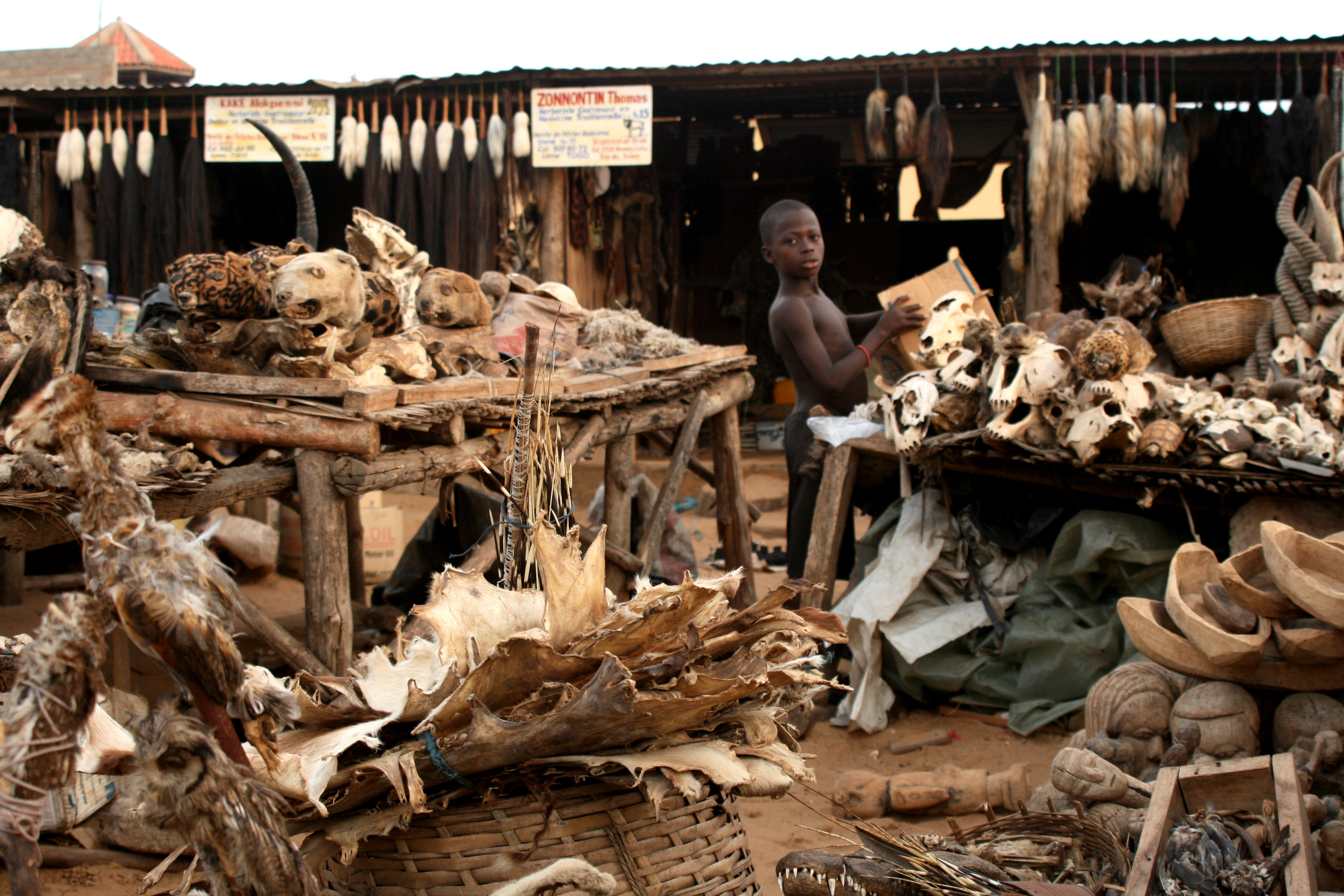
A voodoo fetish market in Lomé, Togo, 2008

The use of the concept in the study of religion derives from studies of traditional West African religious beliefs, as well as from Vodun, which in turn derives from those beliefs.

Fetishes were commonly used in some Native American religions and practices. For example, the bear represented the shaman, the buffalo was the provider, the mountain lion was the warrior, and the wolf was the pathfinder, the cause of the war.

== Japan ==
Katō Genchi (1873–1965), a Shinto priest and scholar of comparative religion, applied the term "fetish" to the historical study of traditional Japanese religion. He cited jewelry, swords, mirrors, and scarves as examples of fetishism in Shinto. In rural areas of Japan, he said he could find many traces of animism, totemism, fetishism, and phallicism. He also maintained that the Ten Sacred Treasures were fetishes and the Imperial Regalia of Japan retained the same traits, and pointed out the similarities with the Pusaka heirlooms of the natives of the East Indies and the sacred Tjurunga of the Central Australians. He noted that the divine sword Kusanagi no Tsurugi, which was believed to provide supernatural protection ('blessings'), was deified and enshrined (at what is now the Atsuta Shrine). Akaruhime no Kami, the female deity of Hiyurikuso Shrine, was said to have originally been a red ball before transforming into a beautiful woman. The jewel around Izanagi-no-Mikoto's neck was deified and called Mikuratana-no-kami.

The Anglo-Irish diplomat and scholar William George Aston (1841–1911) also maintained that Kusanagi no Tsurugi could be seen as an example of fetishism. Originally an offering, the enshrined sword became a mitamashiro (lit. 'spirit representative', 'spirit-token'), more commonly known as the shintai (lit. 'god-body'; a sacred object containing the kami or 'spirit'). Aston observed that people tended to think of the mitama ('spirit') of a deity first as the seat of his or her real presence, and secondly as the deity itself. In practice, the distinction between mitama and shintai was fluid, and shintai even came to be identified as the god's body. For example, the cooking furnace (kamado) itself was worshiped as a deity. Given the vagueness of such distinctions – further accentuated by the restricted usage of images (e.g., in painting or sculpture) – there was a tendency to ascribe special virtues to certain physical objects in place of the deity.

In modern times, the American linguist Roy Andrew Miller (1924–2014) observed that the pamphlet of the nationalistic Kokutai no Hongi proclamation (1937) and the Imperial Rescript on Education (1890) were also often worshipped as "fetishes", and were respectfully placed and kept in household altars (kamidana). (Note: In his discussion of the Japanese identity myth surrounding the national language (Nihongo), Miller described kotodama (the 'spirit' of the language) as "the single most important fetish term in the entire modern myth of Nihongo.")

== DR Congo ==
Made and used by the BaKongo of western DRC, a nkisi (plural minkisi) is a sculptural object that provides a local habitation for a spiritual personality. Though some minkisi have always been anthropomorphic, they were probably much less "naturalistic" or "realistic" before the arrival of the Europeans in the nineteenth century; Kongo figures are more naturalistic in the coastal areas than inland. As Christians tend to think of spirits as objects of worship, idols become the objects of idolatry when worship was addressed to false gods. In this way, European Christian colonialists regarded minkisi as idols on the basis of religious bias.

The foreign Christians often called nkisi "fetishes" and sometimes "idols" because they are sometimes rendered in human form or semi-human form. Modern anthropology has generally referred to these objects either as "power objects" or as "charms".

In addressing the question of whether a nkisi is a fetish, William McGaffey writes that the Kongo ritual system as a whole,

bears a relationship similar to that which Marx supposed that "political economy" bore to capitalism as its "religion", but not for the reasons advanced by Bosman, the Enlightenment thinkers, and Hegel. The irrationally "animate" character of the ritual system's symbolic apparatus, including minkisi, divination devices, and witch-testing ordeals, obliquely expressed real relations of power among the participants in ritual. "Fetishism" is about relations among people, rather than the objects that mediate and disguise those relations.

Therefore, McGaffey concludes, to call a nkisi a fetish is to translate "certain Kongo realities into the categories developed in the emergent social sciences of nineteenth century, post-enlightenment Europe."

== "Fetishism" in extended use ==
From the 19th century skeptics have sometimes labelled "[a]n object of excessive or irrational devotion or admiration, or of obsessive interest" as a "fetish". Thus one may disparage (for example) commodity fetishism, erotic fetishism, or leadership fetishism.

== See also ==
- Boli
- Commodity fetishism
- Sexual fetishism
