= Arne Lietz =

German politician (born 1976)

Arne Lietz MEP
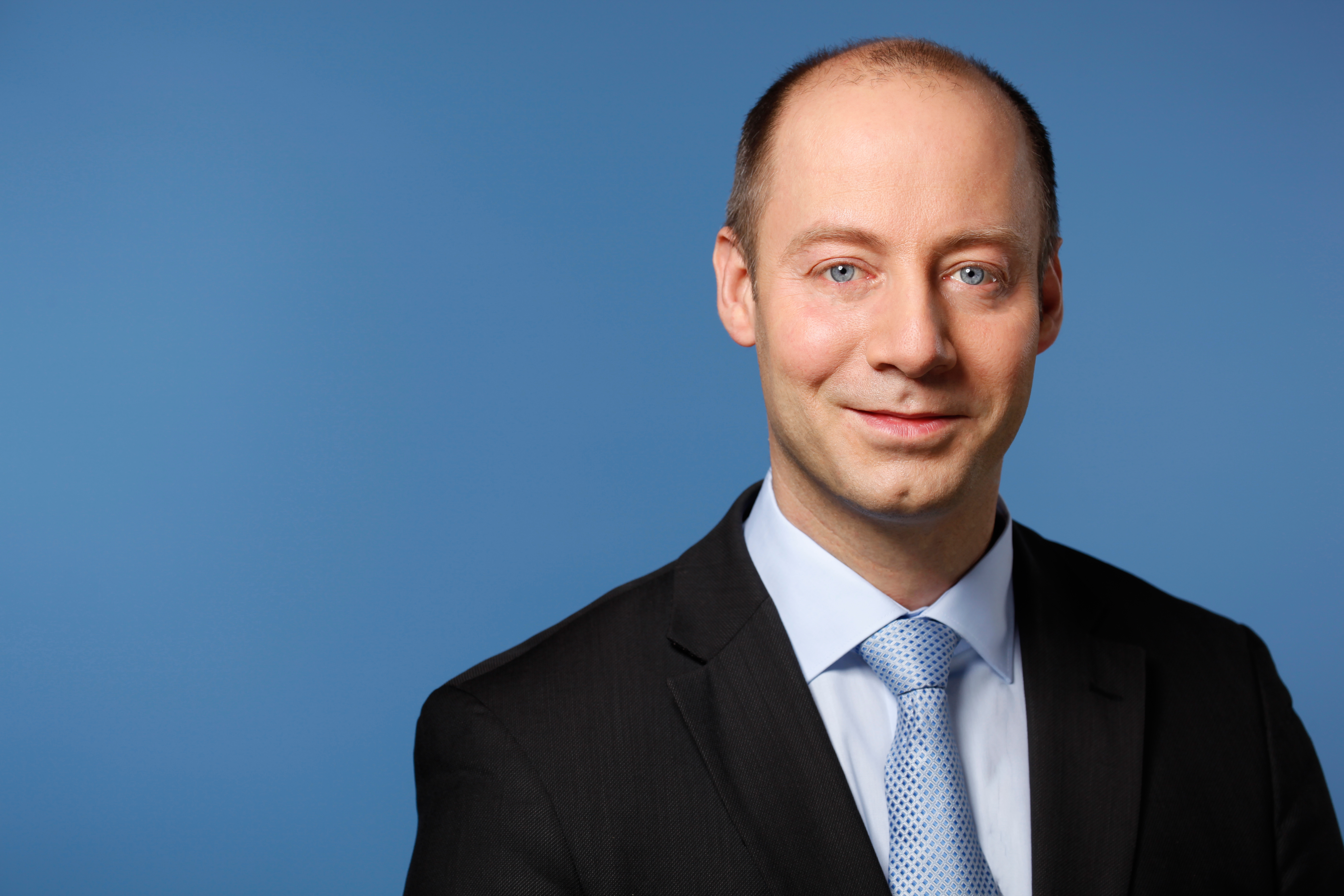

Member of the European Parliament
- In office 1 July 2014 – 1 July 2019
- Constituency: Germany

Personal details
- Born: 23 June 1976 (age 49) Güstrow, Mecklenburg-Vorpommern, Germany
- Party: German; Social Democratic Party; European Union; Party of European Socialists

Arne Lietz (born 23 July 1976) is a German politician who served Member of the European Parliament (MEP) for Germany from 2014 until 2019. He is a member of the Social Democratic Party, part of the Party of European Socialists.

== Early life and career ==
Lietz studied History, Politics and Education at the Humboldt University of Berlin and the University of Cape Town in South Africa. He graduated with a master's degree in History. From 2004–2006 Lietz was the European representative of the American charity Facing History and Ourselves which develops educational material on injustice and prejudice throughout history, with a particular focus on The Holocaust. During his time at the charity he worked in Berlin, Boston and London. He later worked as a parliamentary assistant, a script-writer and a washer-up.

== Parliamentary service ==
- Member, Committee on Development (2014–2019)
- Member, Committee on Foreign Affairs (2014–2019)
- Member, Delegation for relations with Israel (2014–2019)
- Member, Delegation for relations with the Korean Peninsula (2015–2019)

In addition to his committee assignments, Lietz served as a member of the European Parliament Intergroup on Western Sahara.

== Other activities ==
- Energy Watch Group (EWG), Member
- German War Graves Commission, Member of the Parliamentary Advisory Board
- Atlantik-Brücke, Member
- Tönissteiner Kreis, Member
- German United Services Trade Union (ver.di), Member

== Personal life ==
Lietz lives in Wittenberg.
