= Mattie Lietz =

American painter (1893–1956)

Mathilda Lietz
- Born: July 21, 1893; Peoria, Illinois
- Died: January 15, 1956 (aged 62); Grand Detour, Illinois
- Other names: Mattie
- Education: Butler University, Art Institute of Chicago

Mathilda (Mattie) Lietz (21 July 1893 in Peoria, Illinois - 15 January 1956 in Grand Detour, Illinois) was an American painter.

== Early career ==
Lietz spent most of her career living in Peoria, Illinois where she worked as a painter and educator. She studied at Butler University in Irvington, Indiana and later attended The Art Institute of Chicago where she studied with Oberteuffer, John Thomas Nolf, George Elmer Browne, Frederick Milton Grant, and Henrik Asor Hansen.

== Associations ==
Her professional associations included:

- La Grande Art League
- Hoosier Salon Art Gallery
- The Art Institute of Chicago
- All-Illinois Fine Art Association
- Burpee Art Gallery in Rockford, Illinois
- The Chicago Galleries Association
- National Academy of Design (NYC)
- The Association of Chicago Painters & Sculptors

== Works ==
Some of Lietz’s works can be found at:

- The Tipton, Indiana, Public Library
- The Cossette School in La Grande, Illinois
- The Norton Art Gallery in Palm Beach, Florida
- MattieLietz.com

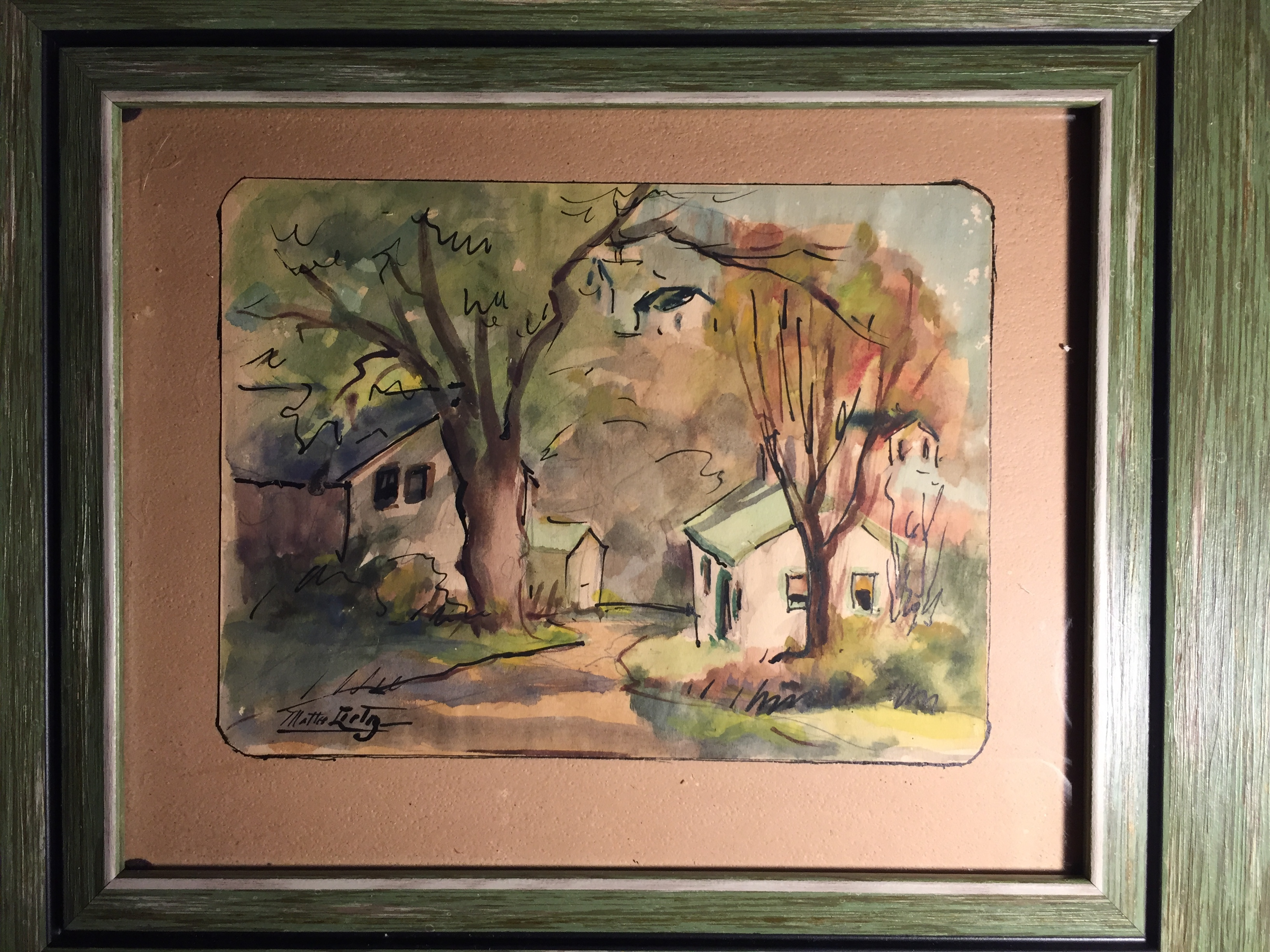

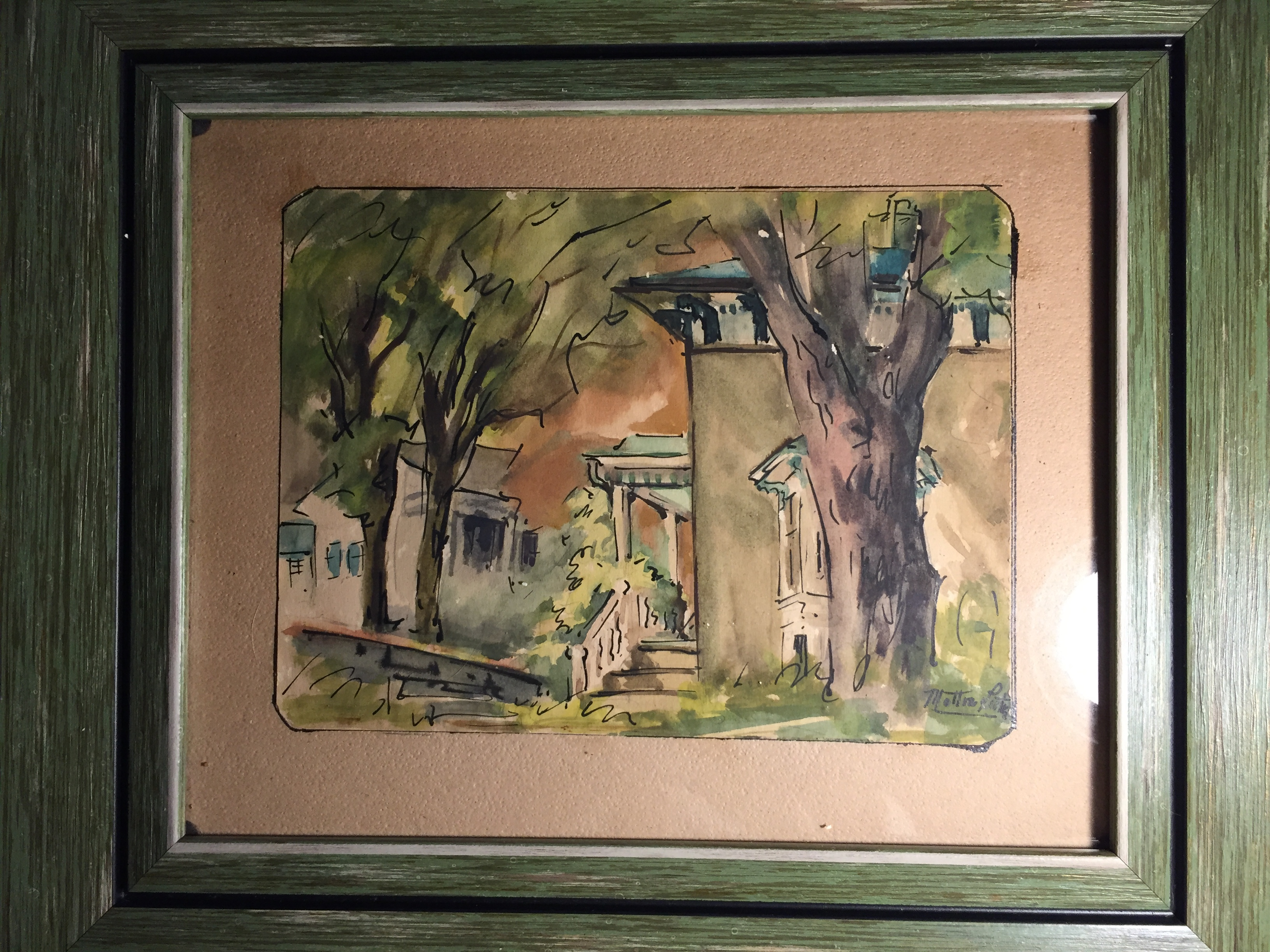
