= William Pietz =

Intellectual historian and political activist (born 1951)

William Pietz (born 1951) is an intellectual historian and political activist. He is known for his scholarship related to the concept of fetishism.

== Biography ==
Pietz completed an interdisciplinary Masters in Philosophy and Political Theory from The New School for Social Research, and his PhD in the History of Consciousness at the University of California, Santa Cruz in 1988. He taught at Pitzer College, the University of California, Santa Cruz and Georgetown University.

== Fetishism ==
Pietz is best known for his account of the colonial origins of the concept of fetishism. It was the subject of his dissertation as well as a series of articles for the journal Res: Anthropology and Aesthetics, entitled "The Problem of the Fetish." A collection of Pietz's fetishism essays, including previously unavailable material, was published under that title by University of Chicago Press in 2022.

His work in this area has been characterized as "brilliant" and "fundamental". Referring to his trilogy, David Graeber has characterised Pietz as "one of those rarest of people – an independent scholar whose ideas have had a profound effect on the academy".

== Works ==
- 'Bosman's Guinea: the intercultural roots of an Enlightenment discourse', Comparative Civilizations Review 9 (Fall 1982), pp. 1–22.
- 'The problem of the fetish I', Res No. 9 (1985), pp. 5–17
- 'The problem of the fetish II: The origin of the fetish', Res No. 13 (1987), pp. 23–45
- 'The problem of the fetish. IIIa, Bosman's Guinea and the enlightenment theory of fetishism', Res No. 16 (1988), pp. 105–123
- 'The phonograph in Africa: international phonocentrism from Stanley to Sarnoff'. In Derek Attridge et al., eds., Post-Structuralism in History, Cambridge University Press, 1987
- 'The “Post-Colonialism” of Cold-War Discourse', Social Text No. 19/20 (1988), pp. 55–75
- (ed. with Emily Apter) Fetishism as cultural discourse. Ithaca, N.Y.: Cornell University Press, 1993.
- 'Fetishims and materialism: the limits of theory in Marx'. In Pietz and Apter, Fetishism as cultural discourse, 1993, pp. 119–151
- 'Capitalism and Perversion: Reflections on the Fetishism of Excess in the 1980s', positions 3:2 (Fall 1995), pp. 537–565
- 'Fetish', in Robert S. Nelson and Richard Schiff, eds., Critical Terms for Art History, Chicago, 1996
- 'Death of the deodand: accursed objects and the money value of human life', Res: Anthropology and aesthetics 31 (1997), pp. 97–108
- 'The Future of Treason: Political Boundaries in the Information Age', Res No. 32 (1997), p. 64-76
- 'Afterword: how to grow oranges in Norway'. In Patricia Spyer, ed., Border Fetishisms: Material Objects in Unstable Spaces, Routledge, 1998, pp. 245–52.
- 'The fetish of civilization: sacrificial blood and monetary debt'. In Peter Pels & Oscar Salemink (eds.) Colonial Subjects: Essays on the Practical History of Anthropology, University of Michigan Press, 1999
- 'The sin of Saul'. In Bruno Latour & P. Weibel, eds., Iconoclash: beyond the image wars in science, religion and art, MIT Press, 2002.
- 'Material considerations: on the historical forensics of contract', Theory, Culture and Society 19:5-6, 2002
- 'Introduction: Decency and Debasement', in Tani Barlow (ed.) New Asian Marxisms, 2002
- Le fétiche: généalogie d'un problème. Paris: Kargo & L'éclat, 2005
- 'Person'. In Donald S. Lopez Jr., ed., Critical Terms for the Study of Buddhism, University of Chicago Press, 2005.
- William Pietz, The Problem of the Fetish, ed. Francesco Pellizzi, Stefanos Geroulanos, and Ben Kafka. University of Chicago Press, 2022
