= Únětice culture =

Bronze Age archaeological culture in Central Europe

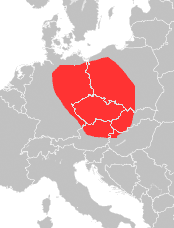
- Geographical range: Europe
- Period: Early Bronze Age
- Dates: c. 2300–1600 BC
- Type site: Únětice
- Preceded by: Bell Beaker culture, Corded Ware culture, Schönfeld culture
- Followed by: Tumulus culture, Nordic Bronze Age, Mad'arovce culture, Trzciniec culture

The Únětice culture, Aunjetitz culture, or Unetician culture (Czech: Únětická kultura, German: Aunjetitzer Kultur, Polish: Kultura unietycka, Slovak: Únětická kultúra) is an archaeological culture at the start of the Central European Bronze Age, dated roughly to about 2300–1600 BC. The eponymous site for this culture, the village of Únětice (Czech pronunciation: [ˈuːɲɛcɪtsɛ]), is located in the central Czech Republic, northwest of Prague.

The Únětice culture emerged from the cultural and demographic convergence of the Late Chalcolithic Corded Ware and Bell Beaker populations in Central Europe. Recent archaeological and archaeogenetic studies have demonstrated that, particularly in the Circum-Harz region of Central Germany, Corded Ware and Bell Beaker communities coexisted for approximately 300 years, occupying the same broader settlement landscape while maintaining distinct settlements, burial practices and material traditions. Over time, these populations underwent increasing interaction and genetic admixture, contributing to the formation of the Early Bronze Age Únětice population and its distinctive cultural identity.

There are about 1,400 documented Únětice culture sites in the Czech Republic and Slovakia and 550 in Poland, with about 500 further sites and loose-finds locations in Germany. The Únětice culture is also known from northeastern Austria (in association with the so-called Böheimkirchen group) and from western Ukraine.

== History of research ==
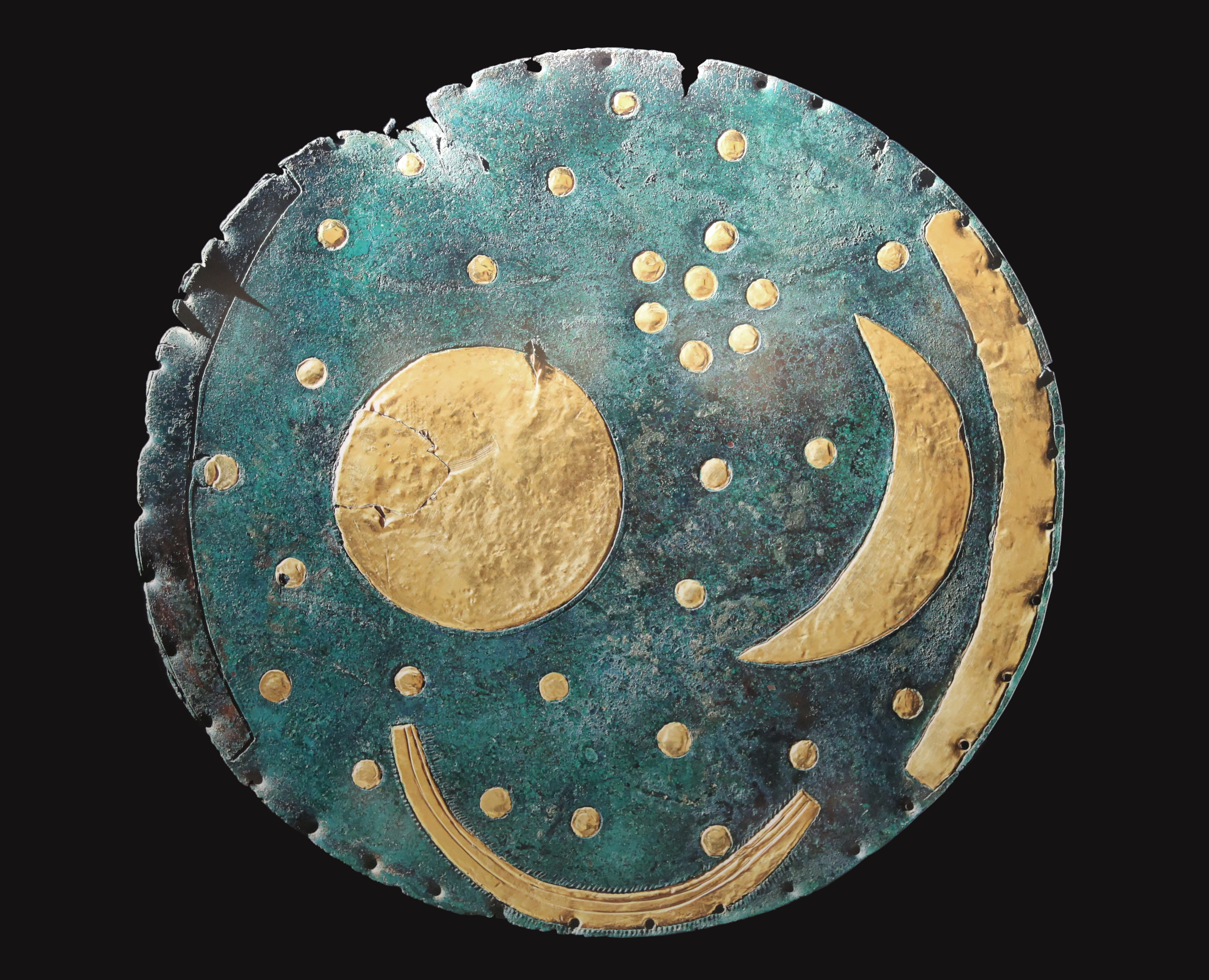
Nebra sky disk discovered in Saxony-Anhalt, Germany, Early Bronze Age, 1800–1600 BC

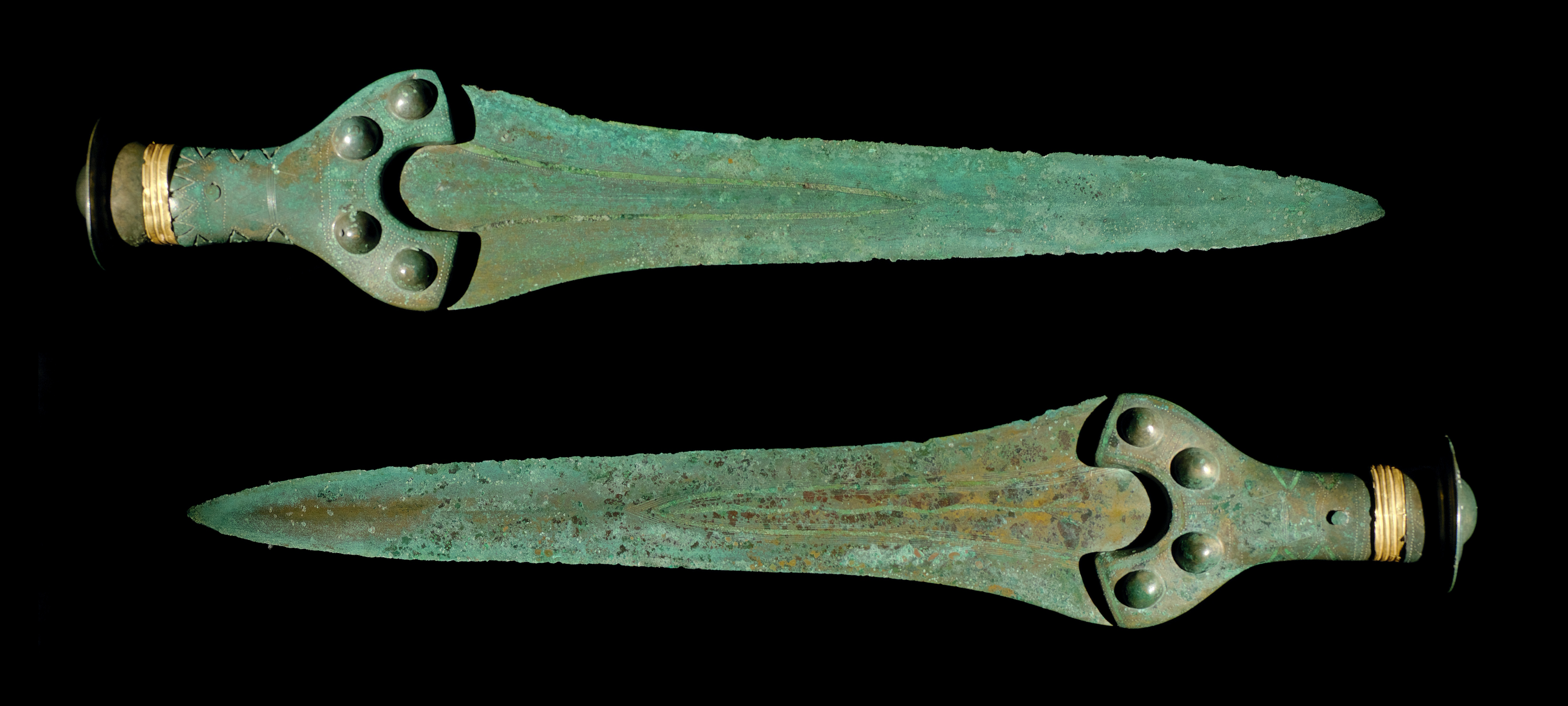
Bronze swords buried with the Nebra sky disk

The Únětice culture is named after a discovery by Czech surgeon and amateur archaeologist Čeněk Rýzner (1845–1923), who in 1879 found a cemetery in Bohemia of over 50 inhumations on Holý Vrch, the hill overlooking the village of Únětice. At about the same time, the first Úněticean burial ground was unearthed in Southern Moravia in Měnín by A. Rzehak. Following these initial discoveries and until the 1930s, many more sites, primarily cemeteries, were identified, including Němčice nad Hanou (1926), sites in the vicinity of Prague, Polepy (1926–1927), and Šardičky (1927).

In Germany, a princely grave in Leubingen had already been excavated in 1877 by F. Klopfleisch; however, he incorrectly dated the monument to the Hallstatt during the Iron Age. In subsequent years, a main cluster of Úněticean sites in Central Germany were identified at Baalberge, Helmsdorf, Nienstedt, Körner, Leubingen, Halberstadt, Klein Quenstedt, Wernigerode, Blankenburg, and Quedlinburg. At the same time, Adlerberg and Straubing groups were defined in 1918 by Schumacher.

In Silesia, the first archaeologist associated with the discovery and identification of the Únětice culture was Hans Seger (1864–1943). Seger not only discovered several Úněticean sites and supervised pioneering excavations in locations in Silesia, now in Poland as Przecławice, but he also linked Bohemian European Bronze Age (EBA) materials with similar assemblages in Lower Silesia. In Greater Poland, the first excavations at the royal Úněticean necropolis of Łęki Małe were undertaken by Józef Kostrzewski in 1931, but major archaeological discoveries at this site were made only years later, in 1953 and 1955. In 1935, Kostrzewski published the first data and findings of the Iwno culture, another Bronze Age culture contemporaneous with the Únětice EBA, from western Poland. In 1960, Wanda Sarnowska (1911–1989) began excavations in Szczepankowice, near Wrocław, southwest Poland, where a new group of barrows was unearthed. In 1969, she published a new monograph on the Únětice culture, in which she cataloged, analysed, and described assemblages deriving from 373 known EBA Úněticean sites in Poland.

The first unified chronological system (relative chronology) based on a typology of ceramics and metal artefacts for the Únětice culture in Bohemia was introduced by Václav Moucha in 1963. This chronological system, consisting of six sub-phases, was considered valid for the Bohemian groups of the Únětice culture, and it was later adapted in Poland and in Germany.

More recently, the Únětice culture has been cited as a pan-European cultural phenomenon whose influence covered large areas due to intensive exchange, with Únětice pottery and bronze artefacts found from Ireland to Scandinavia, the Italian Peninsula, and the Balkans. As such, it is a candidate for a community connecting a continuum of already scattered, late Indo-European languages ancestral to the Italo-Celtic, Germanic, and perhaps Balto–Slavic groups, between which words were frequently exchanged, and a common lexicon, as well as regional isoglosses were shared.

== Chronology ==
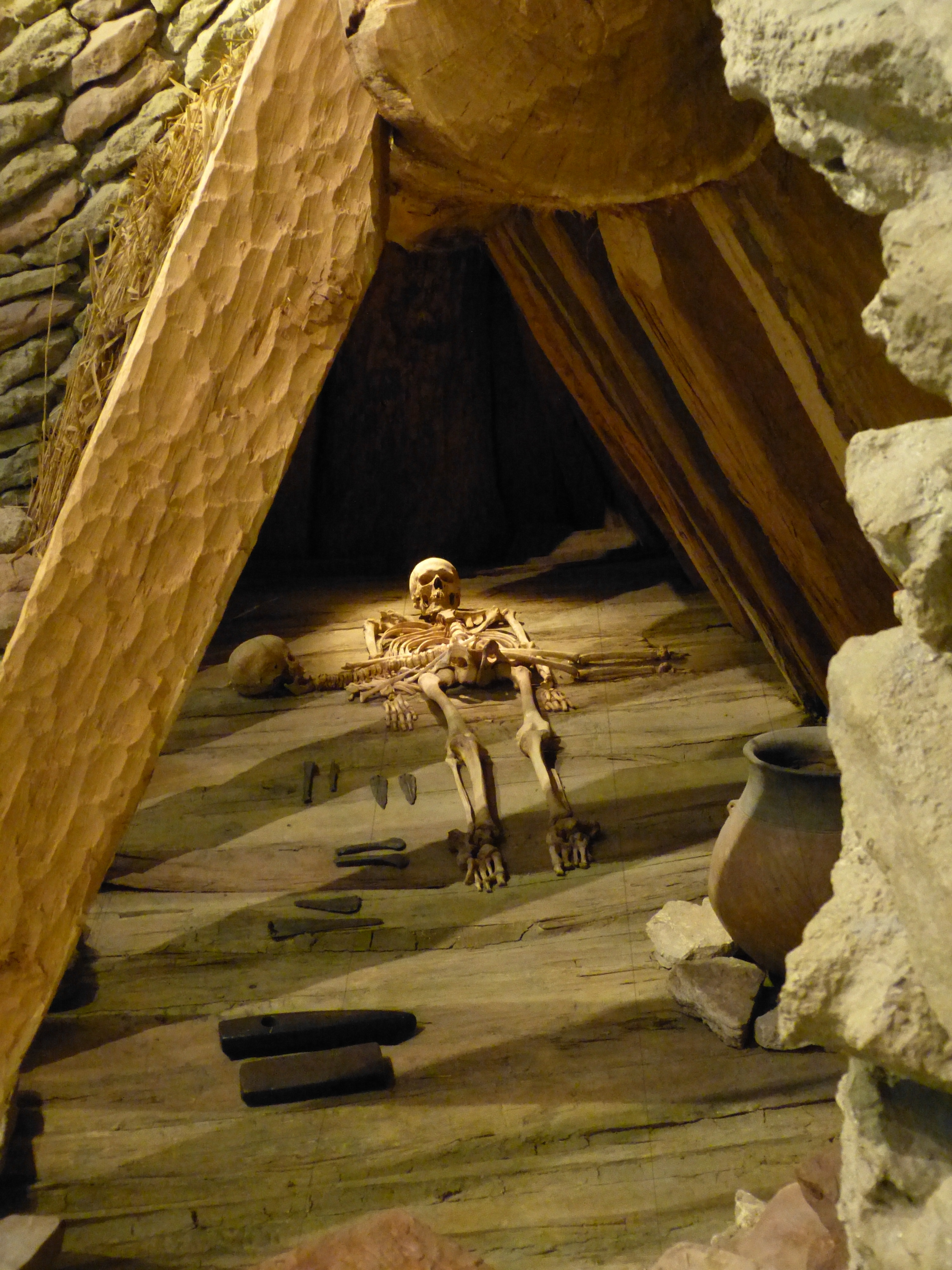
Reconstruction of the Leubingen burial chamber, Germany

The culture corresponds to Bronze A1 and A2 in the chronological schema of Paul Reinecke:

- A1: 2300–1950 BC: triangular daggers, flat axes, stone wrist-guards, flint arrowheads
- A2: 1950–1700 BC: daggers with metal hilt, flanged axes, halberds, pins with perforated spherical heads, solid bracelets

Relative chronology of the Únětice culture in Czechia and Slovakia
Period	Reinecke 1924	Moucha 1963	Pleinerová 1967	Bartelheim 1998		Absolute dating
Late Eneolithic	(A0)	1. Proto-Únětice	Ia Ib	Older Únětice	1	2300–2000 BC
Late Eneolithic	(A0)	2. Old Únětice	Ia Ib	Older Únětice	1	2300–2000 BC
Late Eneolithic	(A0)	3. Middle Únětice	II	Older Únětice	2	2300–2000 BC
Late Eneolithic	(A0)	4. Pre-classical Únětice	II	Older Únětice	2	2300–2000 BC
Older Bronze Age	A1	5. Classic Únětice	III	Younger Únětice	3	2000–1800 BC
Older Bronze Age	A2	6. Post-classical Únětice	III	Younger Únětice	3	1800–1700 BC
Middle Bronze Age	B2	Tumulus culture (west), Trzciniec culture (east)

== Sub-groups ==
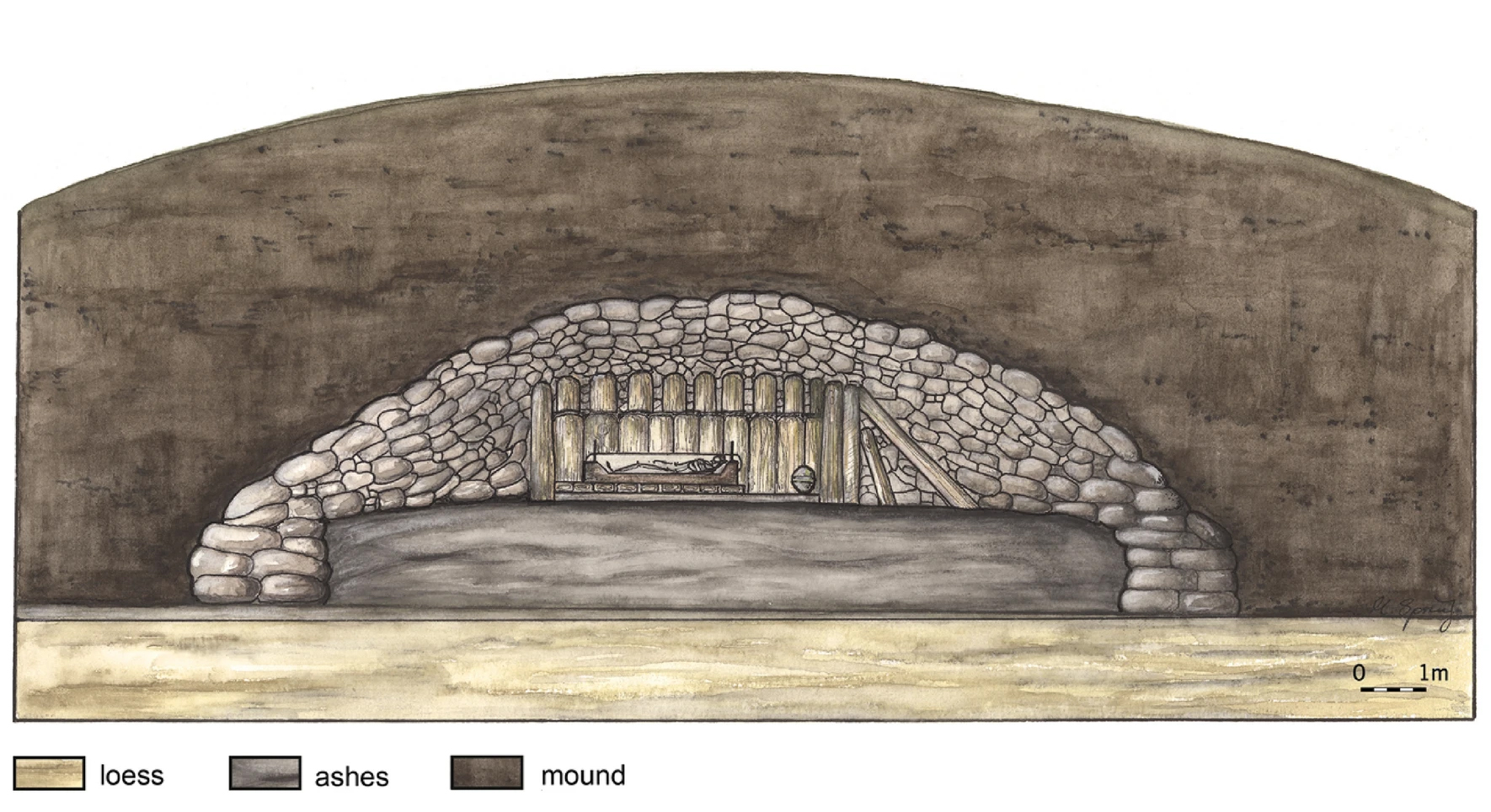
Diagram of the Helmsdorf barrow, Germany

The Únětice culture originated in the territories of contemporary Bohemia. Ten local sub-groups can be distinguished in its classical phase:

- Moravia Group
- Slovakia Group; following the so-called Nitra Group
- Lower Austria Group
- Central Germany Group
- Lower Saxony Group
- Lower Lusatia Group
- Silesia Group
- Greater Poland (Kościan) Group
- Galicia (Western Ukraine) Group

== Artefacts and characteristics ==
=== Burials ===
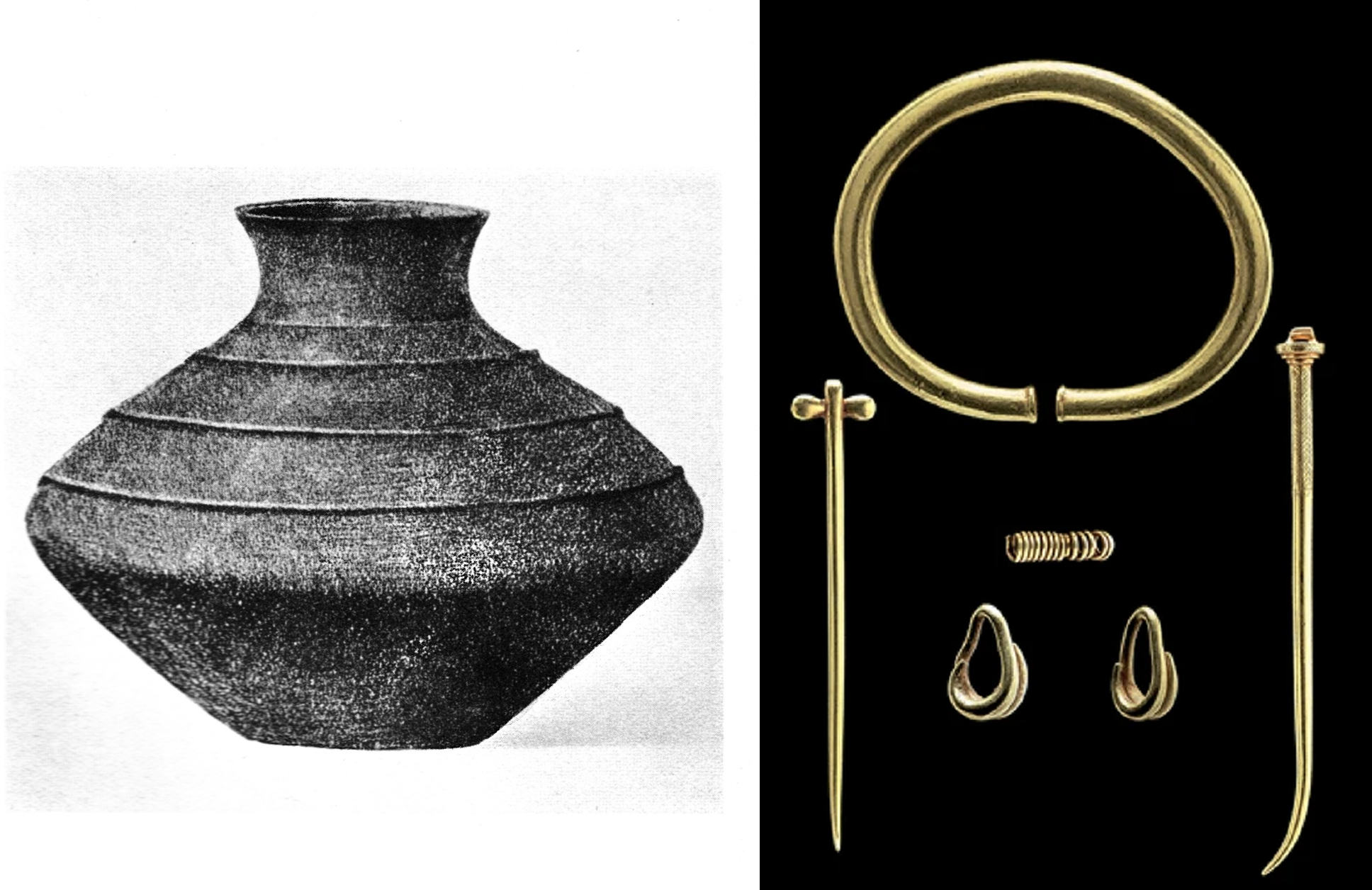
Ceramic and gold artefacts from the Helmsdorf barrow, Germany, 1840 BC

From a technical point of view, Úněticean graves can be divided in two categories: flat graves and barrows. The Únětice culture practiced skeletal inhumations, but cremation occasionally took place as well.

A typical Úněticean cemetery was situated near a settlement, usually on a hill or acclivity, and in the vicinity of a creek or river. The distance between the cemetery and the adjacent settlement very rarely exceeded 1 kilometre (0.62 mi). Cemeteries were usually spatially organized, with symmetrical rows or alleys. Burials were orientated according to stars and the relative position of the sun on the horizon during the year, which may indicate advanced prehistoric astronomical observations.

==== Barrows—princely graves ====
To date, over fifty Úněticean barrows have been found in Central Europe; the majority of the monuments have been published in archaeological literature, but only about 60% of that number have been excavated according to modern standards. Some of the tombs found in the early 19th century, such as the many tombs in Kościan County, Poland, were incorrectly identified and robbed or otherwise destroyed.

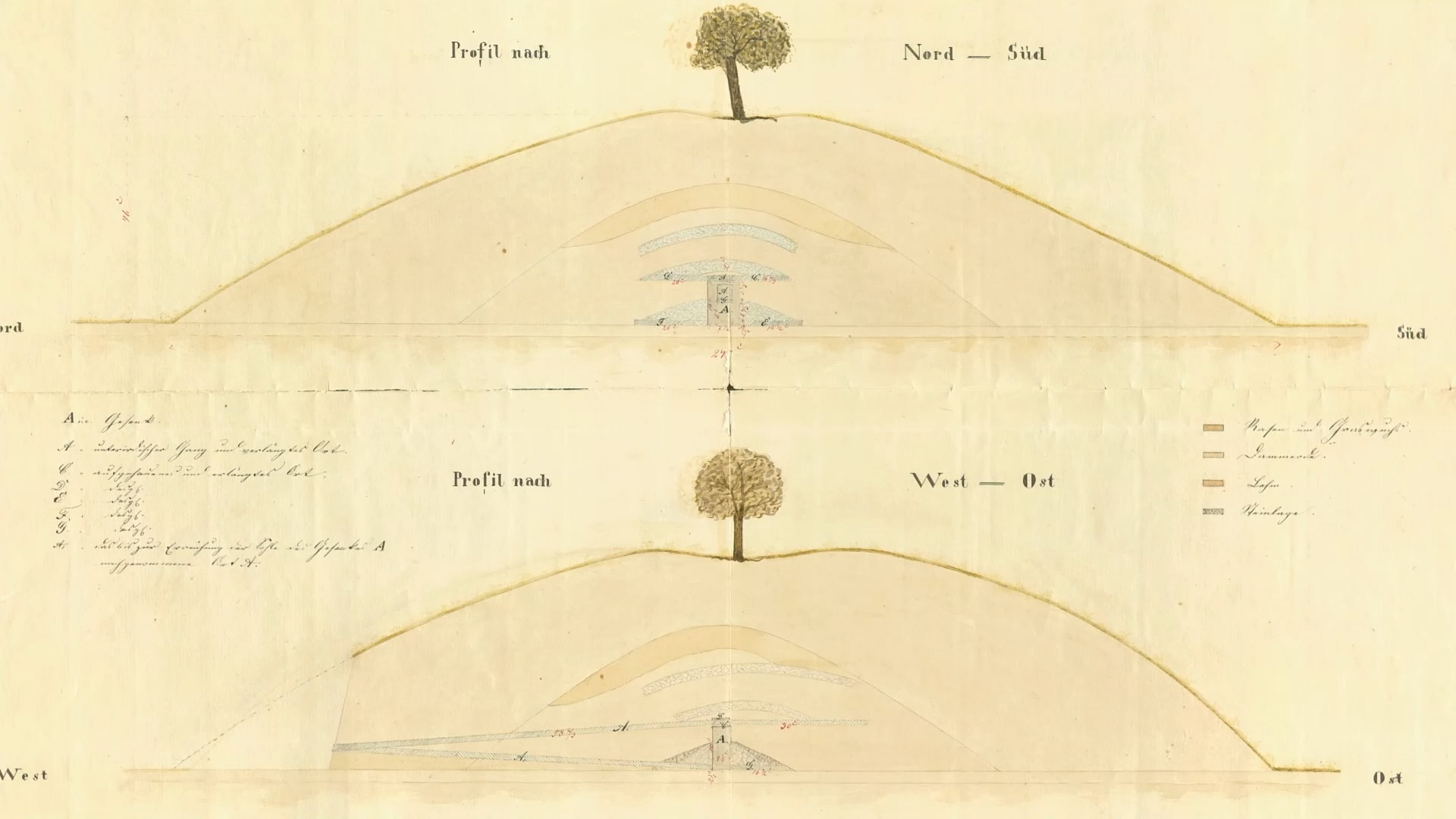
19th-century diagram of the Bornhöck burial mound, Germany.

The largest concentrations of Úněticean barrows, also known in archaeological literature as "princely graves", can be found:

- in Czechia—in the vicinity of Prague, e.g., Brandýs, Březno, Mladá Boleslav–Čejetičky–Choboty, Prague 5—Řeporyje, Prague 6—Bubeneč;
- in Central Germany—in, for example, Bornhöck, Leubingen, Helmsdorf, Baalberge, Dieskau II, Sömmerda I–II and Groß Gastrose;
- in Poland—in Greater Poland, e.g., Łęki Małe I–V, in Silesia, e.g., Szczepankowice Ia–Ib, Kąty Wrocławskie.

The size of the tombs varies, with the largest originally being the Bornhöck burial mound (the largest Bronze Age burial mound in Central Europe), dating from c. 1800 BC. The mound belonged to a ruler or "prince" who was likely associated with the Nebra sky disc. It was originally around 65 metres in diameter and 15 metres in height, but it was mostly destroyed in the late 19th century. The mound was originally covered with white limestone (chalk)—a very unusual practice in Central Europe but common in contemporary Bronze Age Britain. (Note: The Bornhock mound lies at the same latitude (51.41° N) as Silbury Hill in England, the largest prehistoric human-made mound in Europe (constructed c. 2400–2300 BC), which was also covered in white limestone/chalk.) A 'brotlaibidol' clay tablet was also found in the grave.

The largest surviving burial mound is Barrow No. 4 at Łęki Małe, associated with the Kościan Group of the Únětice Culture—which is 50 metres in diameter and 5–6 metres in height today. In the classic phase, a typical "princely grave" was approximately 25 metres in diameter and 5 metres in height.

===== Gold weapons =====
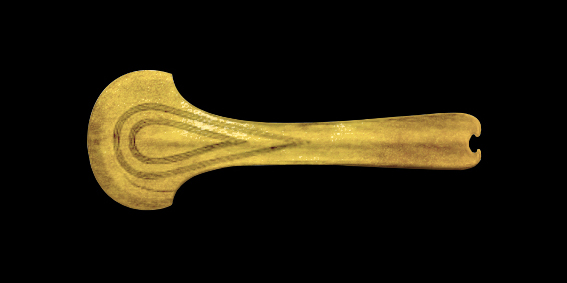
Gold axe from Dieskau, Germany (drawing), c. 1800 BC.

A gold axe and jewellery dating from c. 1800 BC were discovered at Dieskau in Germany and are thought to be associated with the ruler buried in the Bornhöck mound. A gold dagger dating from the Early Bronze Age has also been recovered from Inowrocław in Poland, associated with the Iwno culture. Gold weapons are known from other parts of Europe in this period, including an axe from Tufalau in Romania, belonging to the Wietenberg culture, a dagger from Mala Gruda in Montenegro, associated with the Vučedol culture, a dagger from Dabene in Bulgaria, and daggers and halberds from Perșinari and Măcin in Romania, belonging to the Tei culture. The Tei culture weapons were found buried with Únětice-style gold bracelets. In Switzerland, a large ceremonial axe of a type also found in the Únětice culture (the Thun-Renzenbühl axe) was inlaid with gold decorations using a damascening technique also known from gold-decorated weapons in Mycenaean Greece. A similar axe inlaid with gold was found in a hoard from Trassem in Germany, dating from c. 1600 BC.

==== Flat graves ====
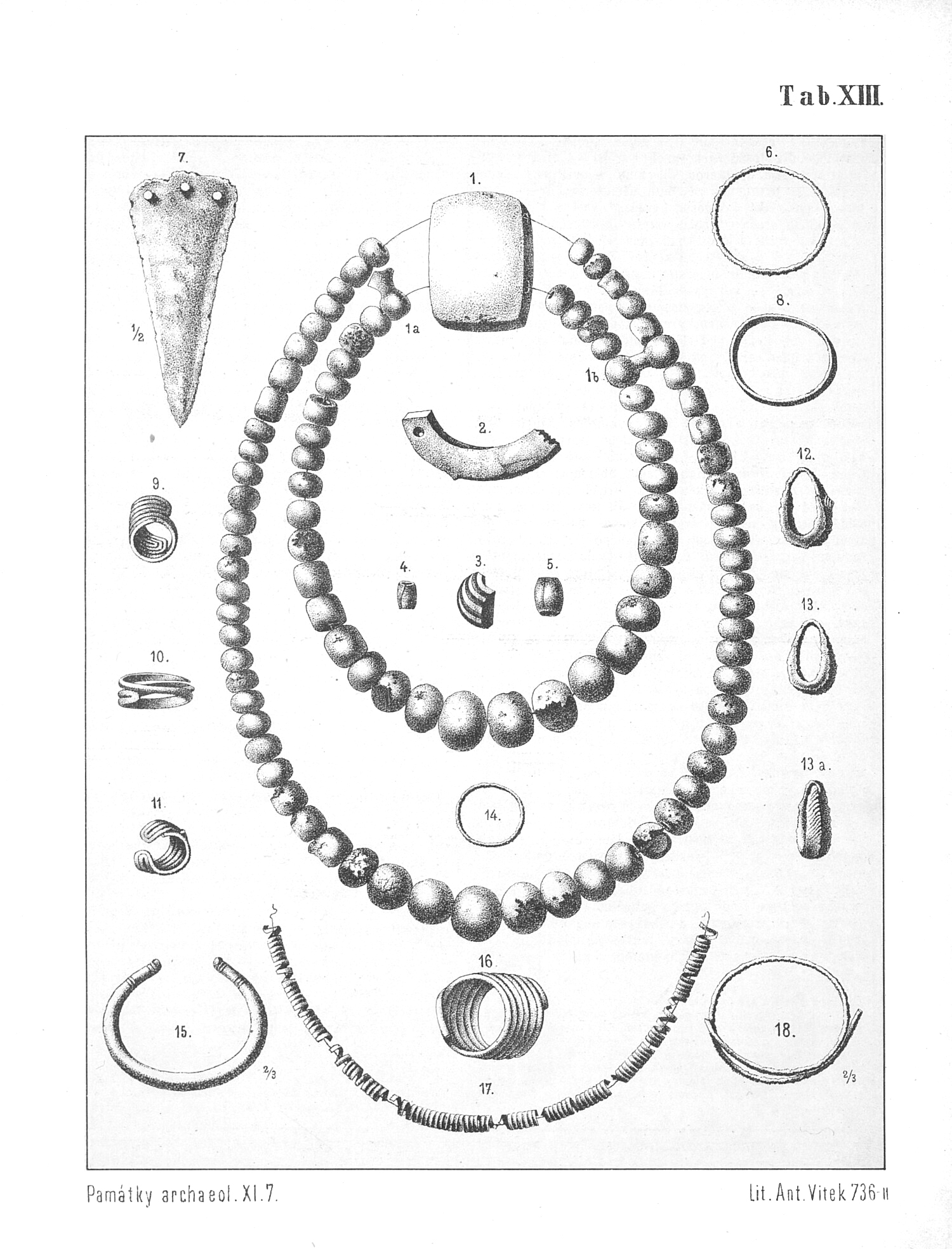
Amber necklace and metal artefacts from the Únětice grave site, Czechia.

A typical Úněticean flat grave was a rectangular or oval pit 1-1.9 metres long, 0.6-1.2 metres wide, and 0.30-1.5 metres deep. Depending on the shape of the bottom and the depth, graves can be divided into four sub-types: rectangular, concave, trapezoid, or hourglass.

Reconstruction of female clothing, bronze headdress, and jewellery from Franzhausen in Lower Austria, c. 2000 BC

One of the most prominent characteristics is the position of the body in the grave pit. The deceased were always buried in a north–south alignment, with the head south and facing east. The body was usually placed in the grave in a slightly contracted position. Exceptions from this rule are sporadic.

In the classic phase (approximately 1850–1750 BC), the Úněticean burial rite displays strong uniformity, regardless of the sex or age of the deceased. Men and women were buried in the same north–south position. The grave goods consisted of ceramic vessels (usually 1–5), bronze items (jewellery and private belongings, rings, hair clips, pins, etc.), bone artefacts (amulets and tools, including needles), occasionally flint tools (the burial of Archer from Nowa Wieś Wrocławska, for example, was buried with colour flint arrowheads). A body deposited within a grave might have been protected with mats made from plant materials or in a coffin, but in the majority of cases, there was no additional coverage of the corpse. A well-known example of wicker-made coffin inhumation derives from the Bruszczewo fortified settlement, near Poznań in Greater Poland. In approximately 20% of burials, stone settings were found. Erection of a full stone setting or just a partial one (a few stones in the corners of the grave) seems to be quite a common practice observed in all phases of the EBA in Central Europe. Wooden coffins were discovered at several sites such as in Lower Silesia. Únětice culture coffin burials can be divided into two types, according to their construction: coffins of the stretcher type, and coffins of the canoe type. Coffins were made of a single block of wood. The most prominent example of a rich cemetery containing many such inhumations is in Przecławice, near Wrocław. Coffin burials appear in Central Europe during the Neolithic and are well known from Bell Beaker and Corded Ware cultures in Moravia. Similar wooden coffin burials are also known from early Bronze Age Britain and the Nordic Bronze Age culture.

At the large Early Bronze Age cemetery of Franzhausen in Lower Austria, social hierarchy is indicated by differing grave depths, the use of oak log coffins, and different quantities and qualities of grave goods. These included animal remains, ceramic vessels, bronze weapons and tools, and jewellery made from bronze, gold, amber, and glass. Some elite women were buried with elaborate bronze headdresses. The cemetery has also provided the earliest preserved fragments of striped fabric clothing in central Europe.

=== Metal objects ===
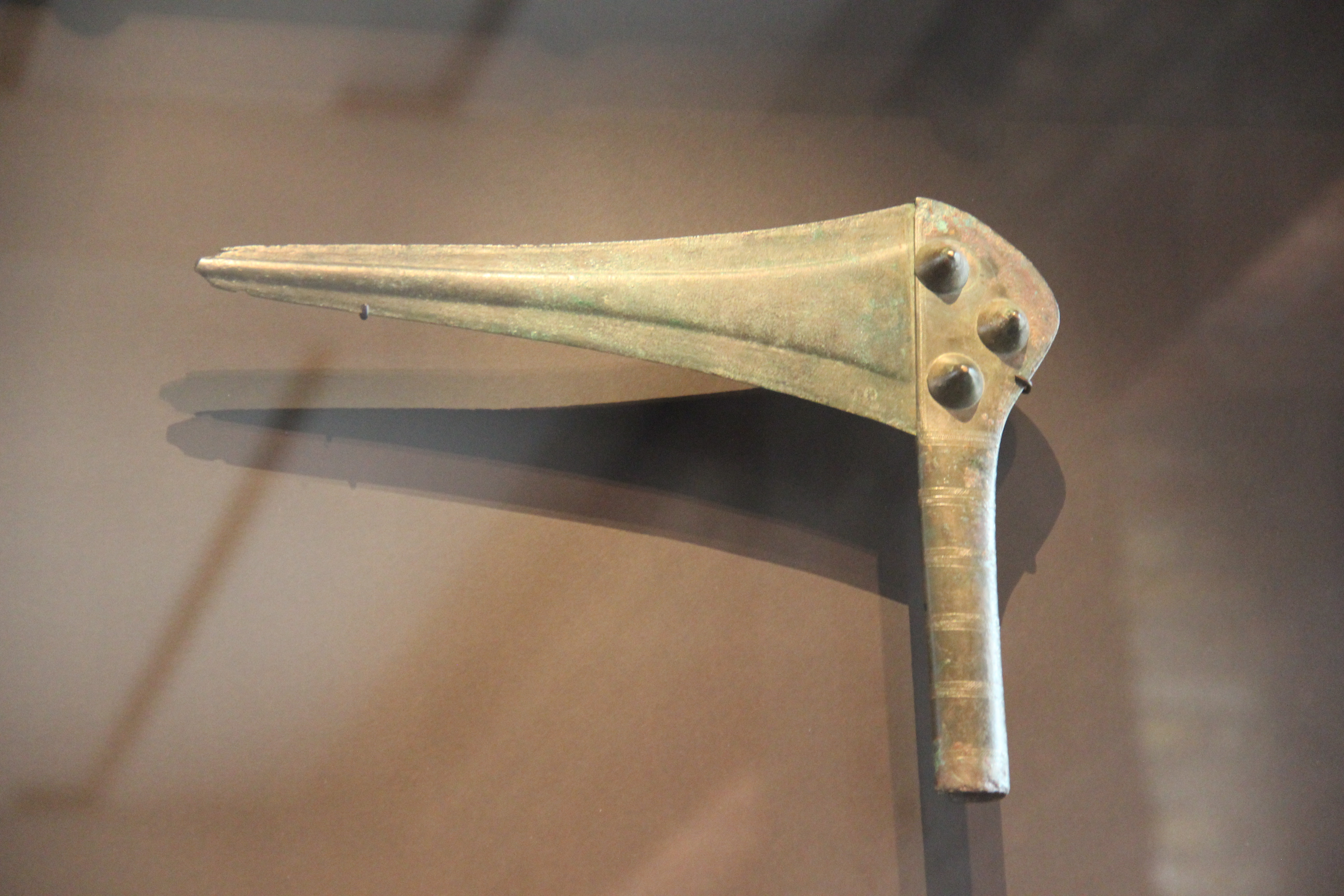
Halberd, Germany

The Únětice culture is distinguished by its characteristic metal objects, including ingot torcs, flat axes, flat triangular daggers, bracelets with spiral ends, disk- and paddle-headed pins, and curl rings, which are distributed over a wide area of Central Europe and beyond.

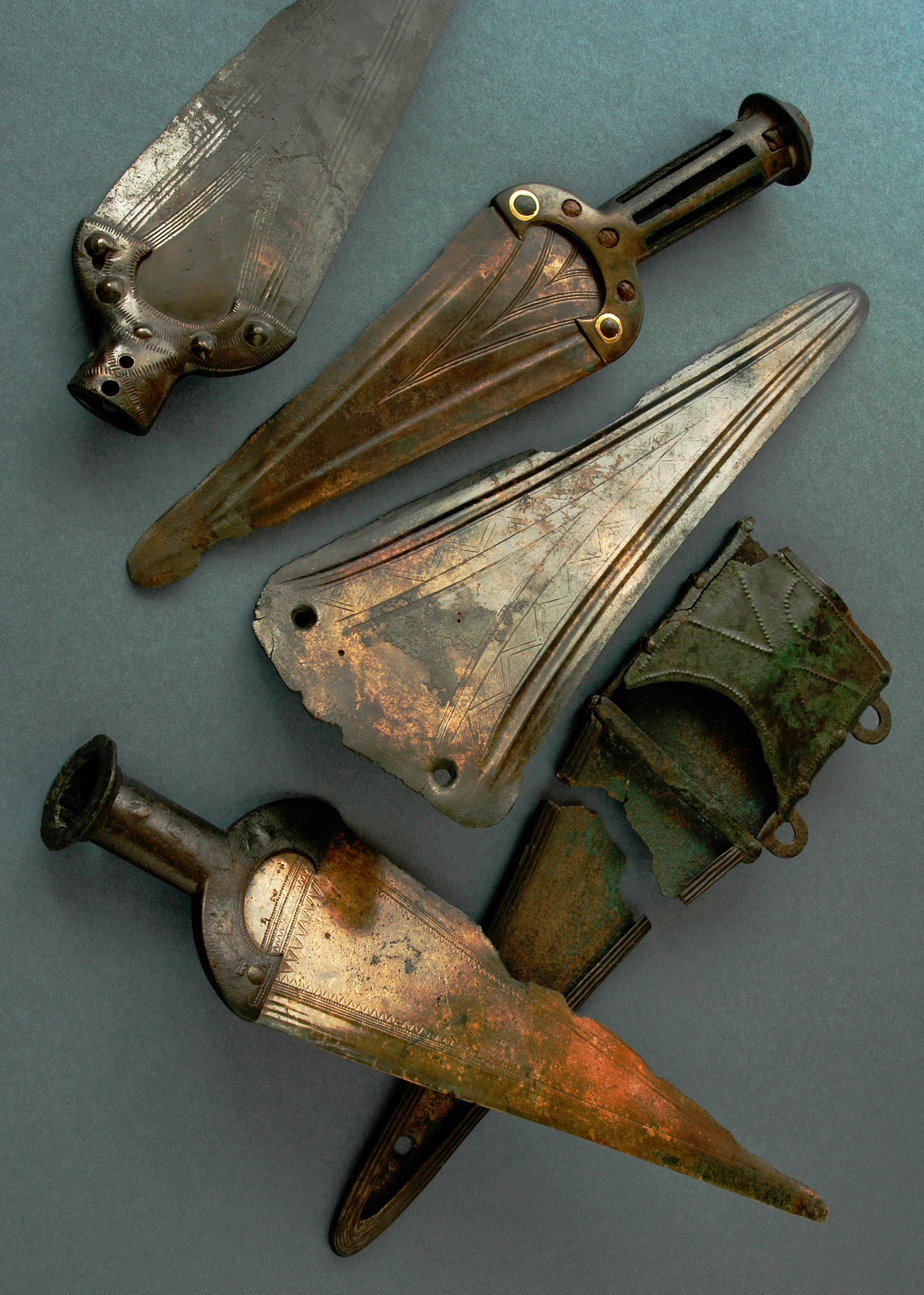
Daggers and scabbard, Czechia

The ingots are found in hoards that can contain over six hundred pieces. Axe-hoards are common as well: the hoard of Dieskau (Saxony-Anhalt) contained 293 flanged axes. Thus, axes might have served as ingots as well. These hoards have formerly been interpreted as a type of storage by itinerant bronze-founders or as riches hidden because of enemy action. They have also been interpreted as evidence for the existence of organized groups of warriors or 'armies'. Hoards containing mainly jewellery are typical for the Adlerberg group.

After 2000 BC, a major expansion of bronze production took place, with tin bronzes becoming dominant. Ring ingots were exchanged widely. Special weapons and ornaments were produced as status symbols for high-ranking individuals.

Gold processing and forging is attested at the fortified settlement of Bruszczewo in Poland from 2300 to 1800 BC. Silver-coated axes are also known from Bohemia.

The famous Nebra sky disk is associated with the Central Germany groups of the Únětice culture. Gold and tin used to make the Nebra disc was imported from Cornwall in southern England, whilst the copper was imported from Austria. The same source of gold was used to make important objects from the early Bronze Age in Britain, such as artefacts from the elite Bush Barrow burial near Stonehenge. According to the archaeologist Sabine Gerloff, the gold plating (or inlay) technique used on the disc originated in Britain. A similar gold inlay technique is seen on the contemporary Thun-Renzenbühl axe from Switzerland, which has also been connected to Mycenaean Greece.

=== Settlements ===
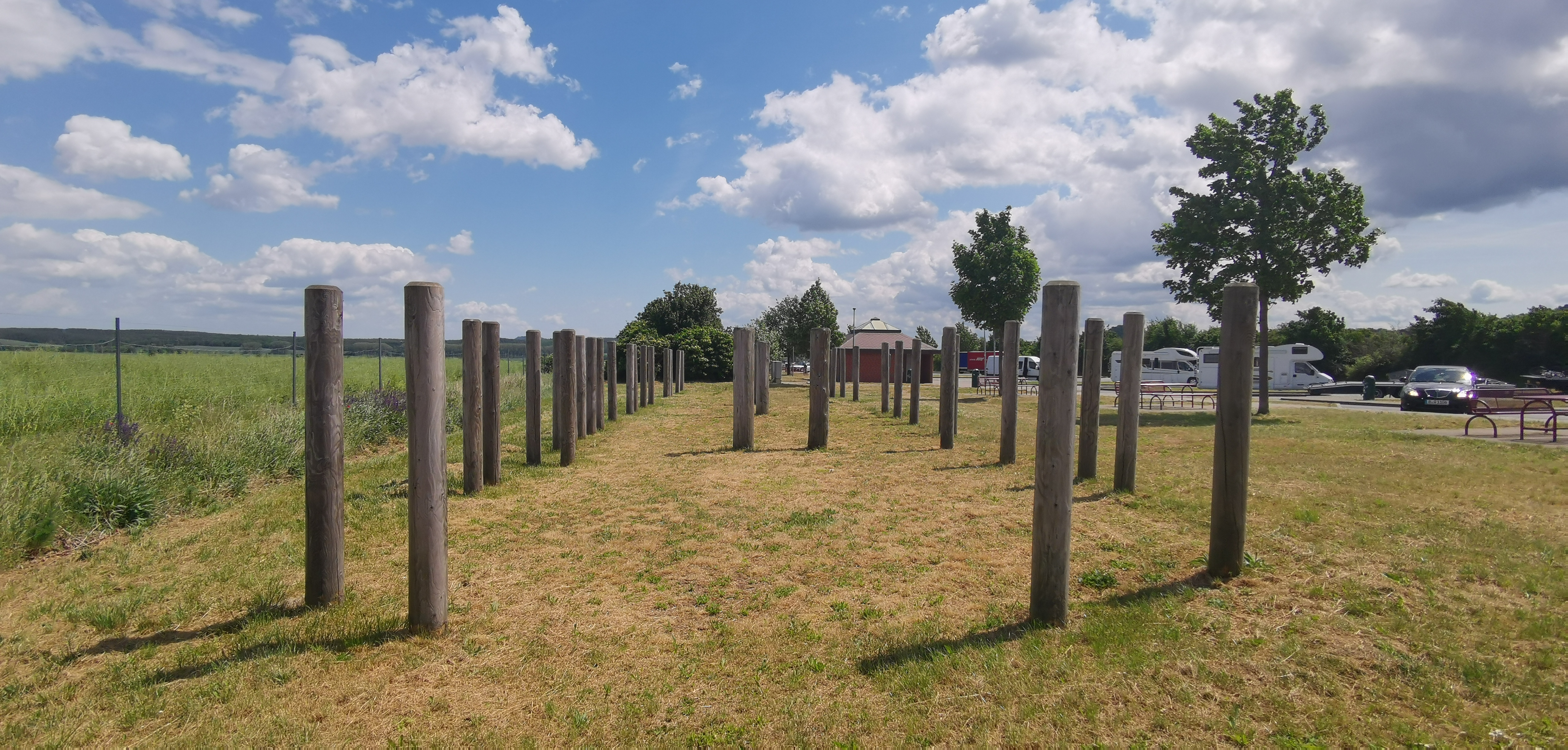
Outline of a Únětice culture longhouse, Germany.

Dermsdorf longhouse, reconstruction.

Typical Úněticean housing structures are known from Czechia and Germany. The houses were constructed of wood and were rectangular in plan, with an entrance on the western side. The gabled roofs were thatched, and walls were constructed using the wattle and daub technique.

One of the most characteristic features associated with settlements are storage pits. They were located beneath the houses and were deep and spacious, with a cylindrical or slightly conical neck, arched walls, and a relatively flat bottom. These pits often served as granaries.

Model of Fidvár fortified settlement, Slovakia, 2100-1800 BC.

The vast majority of settlements consisted of several houses congregated in the communal space of the village or hamlet. Larger fortified villages, with ramparts and wooden fortifications, have been discovered as well, in, for example Bruszczewo in Greater Poland and Radłowice in Silesia. These larger villages played a role as local political centres, possibly also market places, facilitating the flow of goods and supplies. The 'proto-urban' fortified settlement of Fidvár in Slovakia was an important centre for the exploitation of nearby gold and tin deposits. Hillforts are known from the Late Únětice period, such as Cezavy in the Czech Republic, which featured stone fortification walls. The large fortified settlement of Nitriansky Hrádok in Slovakia was built in the latter part of the Únětice period and continued to be used into the subsequent Mad'arovce culture.

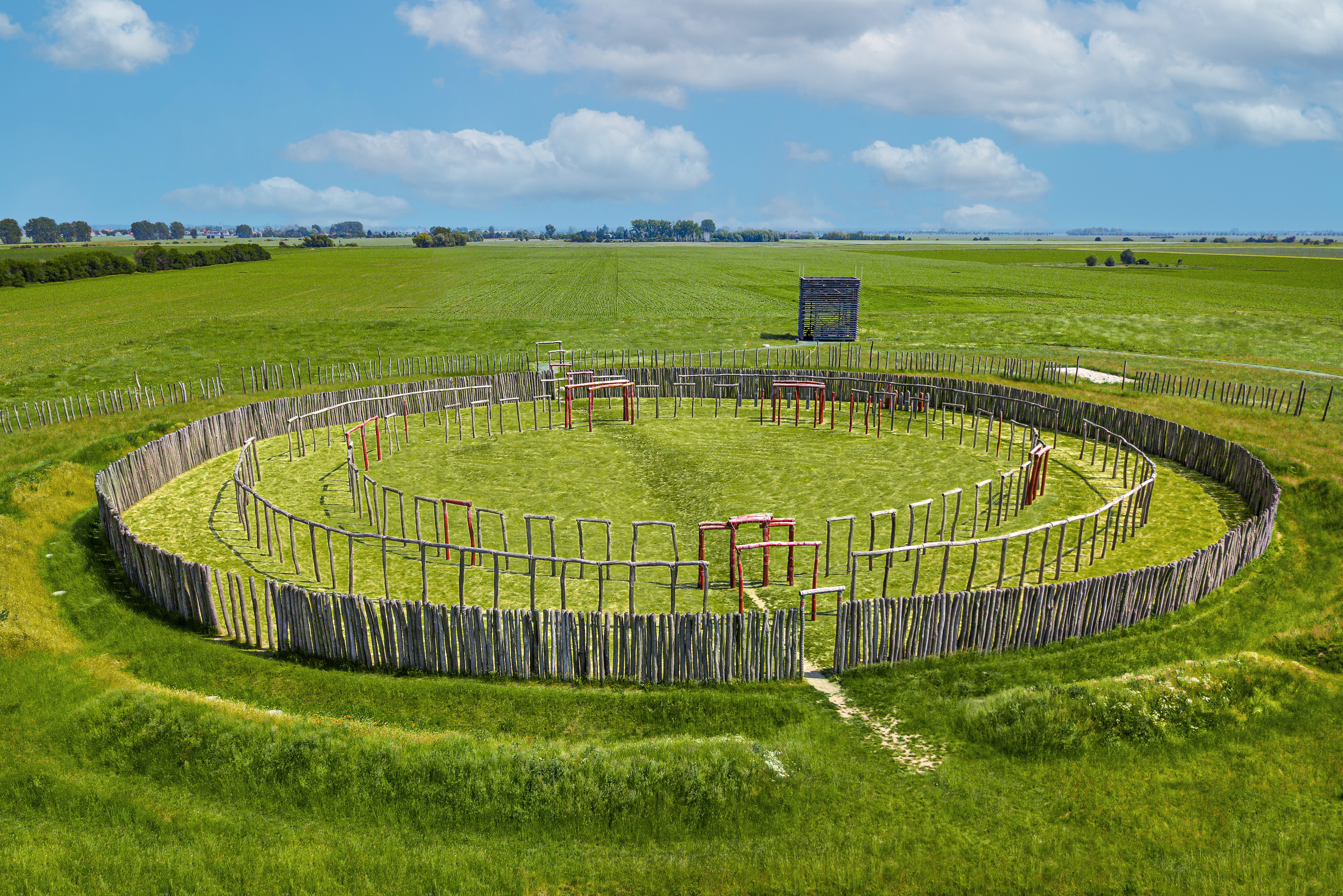
Pömmelte circular enclosure reconstruction, Germany, c. 2300 BC.

Around 2300 BC, large circular enclosures were built at Pömmelte and nearby Schönebeck, in central Germany. These were important ritual sites that remained in use until c. 1900 BC. Pömmelte is described as a central place of supraregional importance. The largest known Early Bronze Age settlement in central Europe was built next to the Pömmelte enclosure. The remains of 130 large timber houses have been found on the site; they were typically 20 metres in length, with some up to 30.5 metres, and with floor areas ranging from 80m² to 360m².

Some Únětice buildings were exceptionally large, such as the Dermsdorf longhouse (44m x 11m) and Zwenkau longhouse (57m x 9m), both in central Germany. The Dermsdorf longhouse is estimated to have been at least 8.5 metres in height. These buildings may have been elite residences, cult buildings, meeting halls, or 'men's houses' for groups of warriors or soldiers under the command of individual rulers. The Dermsdorf longhouse was built a short distance from a settlement at Leubingen, in direct alignment with the nearby Leubingen burial mound. A large number of axes were ritually deposited together in front of the longhouse, which may have belonged to a contingent of warriors or soldiers.

Experimental reconstructions of Bronze Age longhouses indicate that the builders must have had "a complex system of numbers and data for linear measurements" to manage such house-building challenges. Construction techniques included the use of rectangular beams, planks and boards, mortise and tenon joints, scarf joints, single-notched joints, slots, grooves, pivots, wooden pegs, and rabbets.

=== Trade ===
The Únětice culture had trade links with the British Wessex culture. Únětice metalsmiths used pure copper as well as alloys of copper with arsenic, antimony, and tin to produce bronze. The cemetery of Singen contained daggers with a high tin content (up to 9%). They may have been produced in Brittany, where a few rich graves have been found from this period. Cornish tin was widely traded as well. A gold lunula of Irish design has been found as far south as Butzbach in Hessen (Germany). Another gold lunula is known from Schulenburg in Lower Saxony. Amber was also traded, but small fossil deposits may have been used as well as Baltic amber, which may have reached Mycenaean Greece from the Únětice culture. Baltic amber beads have been found as far as Aššur in Iraq, dating from c. 1800–1750 BC, where they were discovered in a foundational deposit beneath the ziggurat. Contacts were already established between central Europe and the eastern Mediterranean from the later third millennium BC, as shown by the presence of identical ring ingots in central Europe and city-states in the Levant (such as Ugarit and Byblos), and identical Schleifennaldeln-type toggle pins found in both regions. Kristiansen & Larsson (2005) suggest that these contacts were initially the result of 'migrating groups from central Europe'. Connections with the Aegean may have originally been established in this period via a migration of the Bell Beaker-related Cetina culture into the region.

==== Weights and money ====
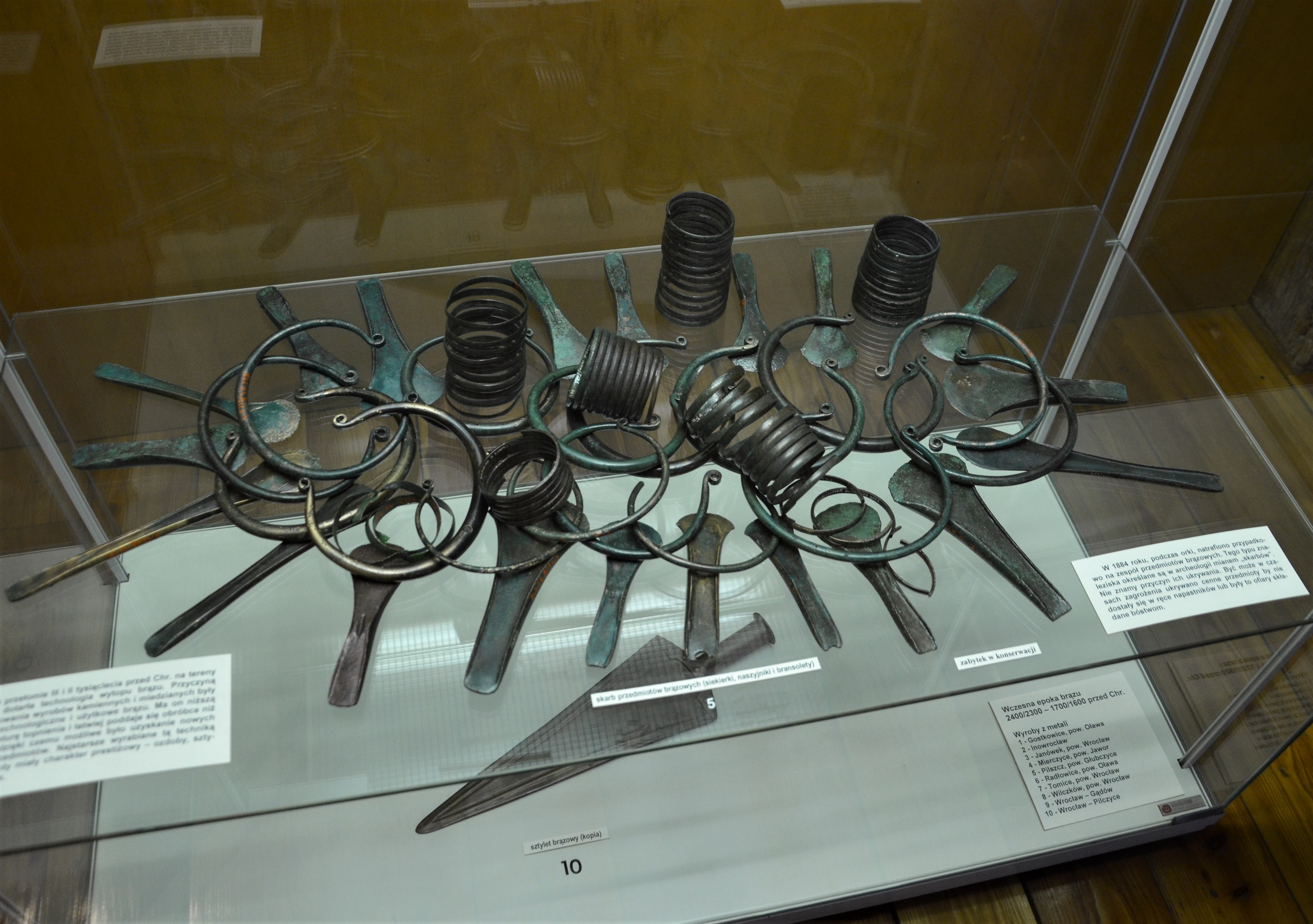
Bronze ingot torcs, spiral bracelets, axes, and dagger, Poland

Analyses of Early Bronze Age rings, ribs, and axe blades from across central Europe have found that they had approximately standardised weights and probably served as a form of commodity money. In the first centuries of the second millennium BC, increasing precision in exchange was achieved by the introduction of lighter ingots. Certain artefacts (e.g., ösenrings) may have also been used as a type of token money.

At the end of the Early Bronze Age, rings and ribs were replaced by scrap and raw metal, indicating the development of weighing scales and the use of weighed metal as a means of payment. This weighing system may have emerged independently in central Europe through the serial production of bronze artefacts with perceptibly similar weights.

In 2014, the largest known hoard of copper rib-ingots was discovered in Oberding, Germany, consisting of 796 ingots, dating from c. 1700 BC. The find is associated with the Straubing group. Most of the ingots were tied together with tree bast in bundles of ten, each individual ingot weighing approximately 100 grams on average and the bundles weighing approximately 1 kilogram each. Forty of these bundles were further grouped into bundles of ten (or 100 ingots). This indicates the use of a decimal system. The use of approximately 1 kilogram of weight is also unusual, as the kilogram was first introduced as a unit of measurement in 1793.

==== 'Enigmatic tablets' ====
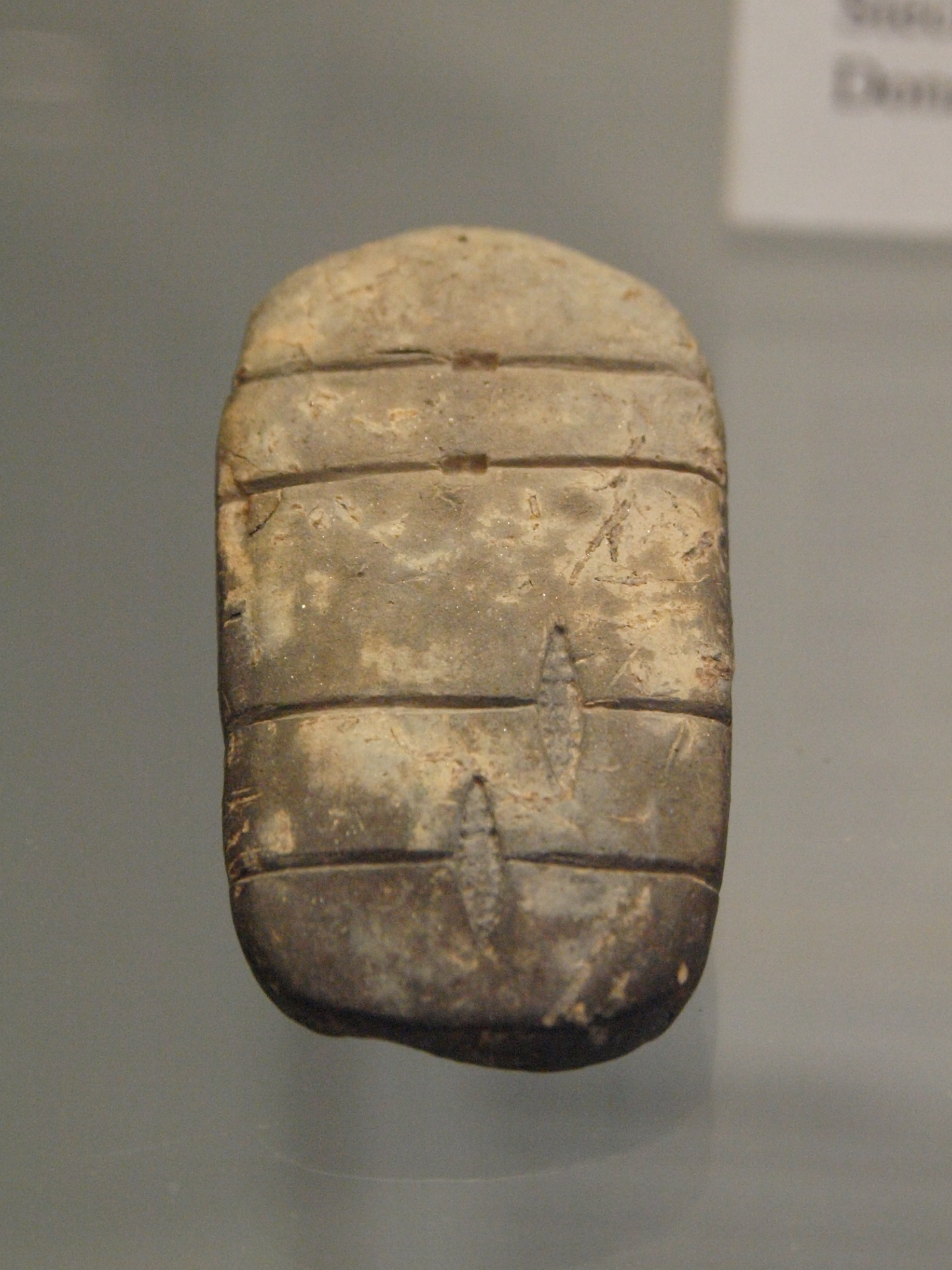
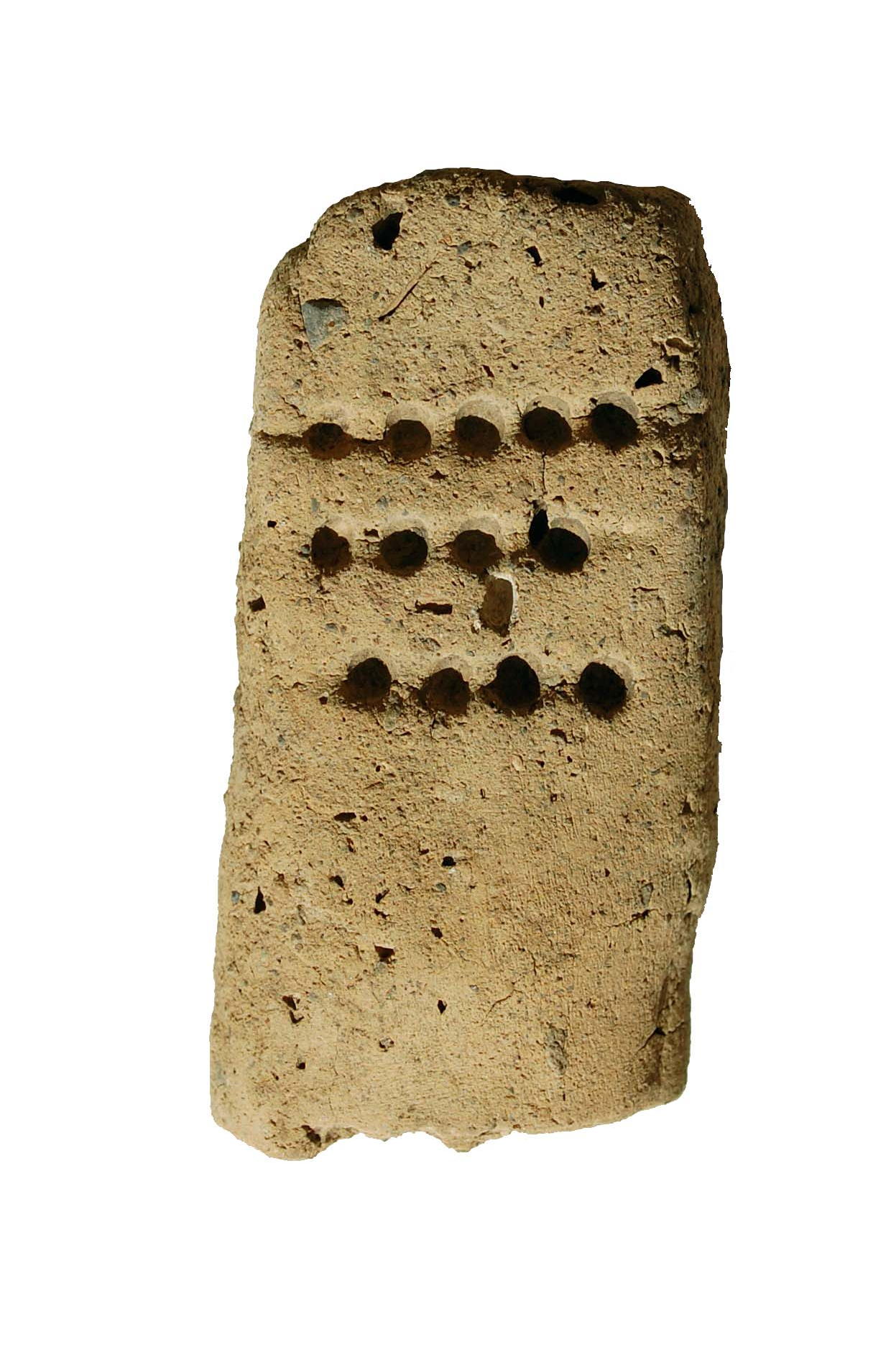
Clay tablets from Germany (left) and Italy (right)

Some Early and Middle Bronze Age sites across central Europe and northern Italy, including Únětice culture sites, have yielded numerous small tablets made from clay (and occasionally stone) marked with sequences of geometric figures such as circles, lines, points, crosses, etc. The tablets are known as brotlaibidole in German ("breadloaf idols") due to their shape and size, and as tavolette enigmatiche in Italian ("enigmatic tablets"). The function of the tablets is not clear, and the meaning of the incisions has not yet been deciphered. The prevailing theory is that they served a purpose in long-distance communication or trade, possibly of metals. According to Harald Meller, they probably represent a 'sign system' involved in trade. They are often found broken in two, which may indicate some sort of credit/debt system. Part of a broken tablet was found within the rubble of the 'princely' burial mound of Bornhöck. Early examples have been found within Bell Beaker contexts in Italy, associated with metallurgical activities.

=== Social organisation ===
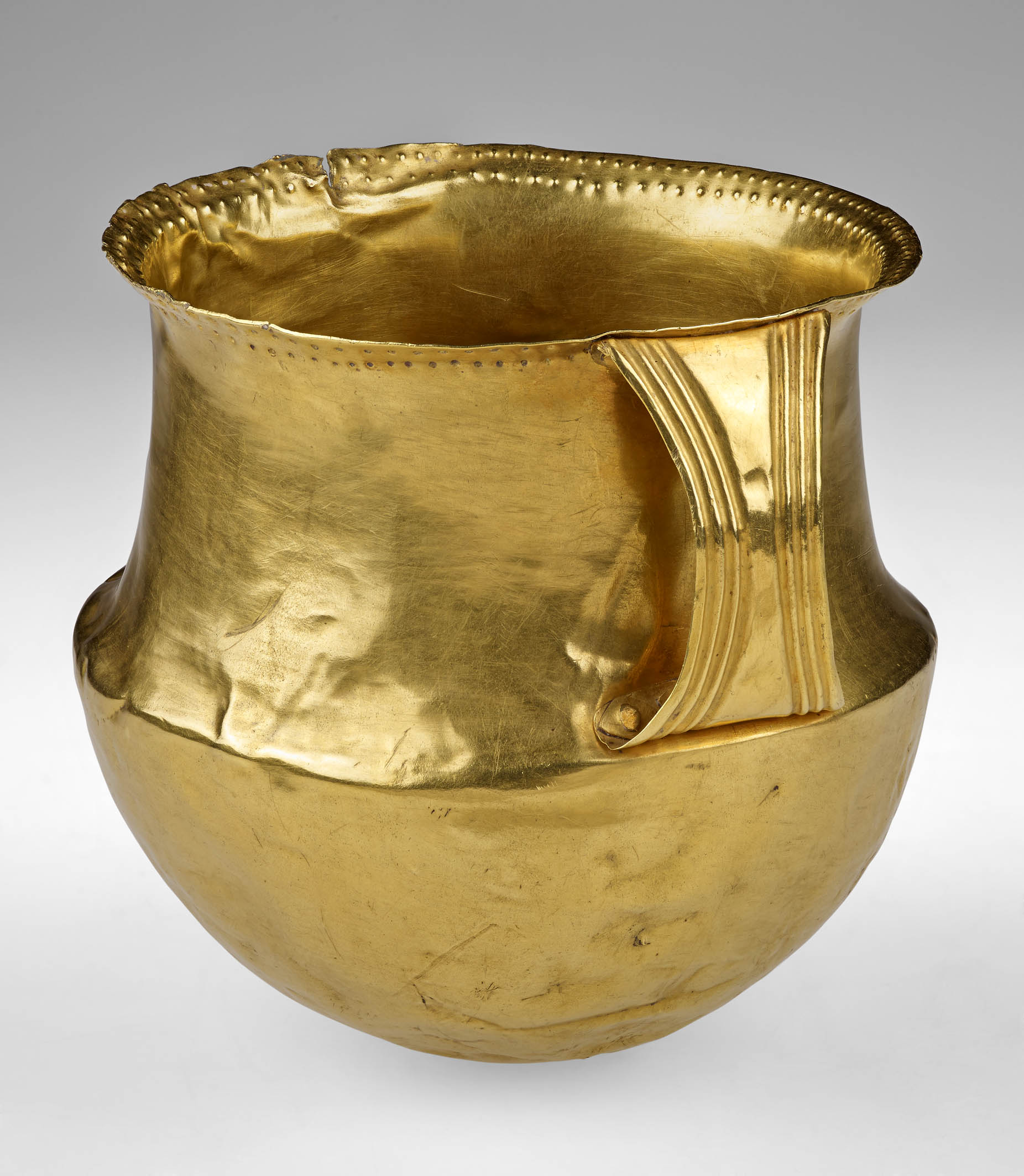
Gold cup, Fritzdorf, Germany, c. 1800–1600 BC

Archaeological evidence from 2000 BC onwards points to the emergence of a more complex and ranked society in central Europe and the appearance of a new aristocratic leadership on top of the traditional clan-based organisation of farmsteads and hamlets. The effects were seen across all spheres of society, from technology and economy to settlement and religion. The Únětice culture in central Germany in particular exhibited a remarkably high level of social complexity. Based on the funerary record, metal hoards, and architectural evidence, it has been suggested that by the 20th-19th centuries BC, this society had developed into a type of state, ruled by a dominant leader supported by armed troops. This is further indicated by evidence for the surplus production and centralisation of agricultural goods as well as the production of the Nebra Sky Disc.

=== Calendar ===
The main entrances of the Pömmelte circular enclosure were oriented towards sunrise and sunset midway between the solstices and equinoxes, indicating that it served as a monument for "ceremonies linked to calendrical rites and seasonal feasting". These alignments marked the same dates as later Celtic seasonal festivals such as Beltane and Samhain, which celebrated the transition of the seasons, the harvest, or commemoration of the dead.

The diameter and ground plan of the Pömmelte enclosure are almost identical to those of Stonehenge in Britain (built around 2500 BC), which was aligned with the solstices and has also been interpreted as serving a calendar function. According to excavators of the Pömmelte site, the similarities between both monuments indicate that they were built by "the same culture" (the Bell Beaker culture), with "the same view of the world". It has been suggested that the close similarity between Pömmelte and earlier earth-and-timber circular enclosures, such as the Goseck Circle in Germany (c. 4900 BC) and henges in Britain, may indicate a continuation of traditions dating back to the early Neolithic.

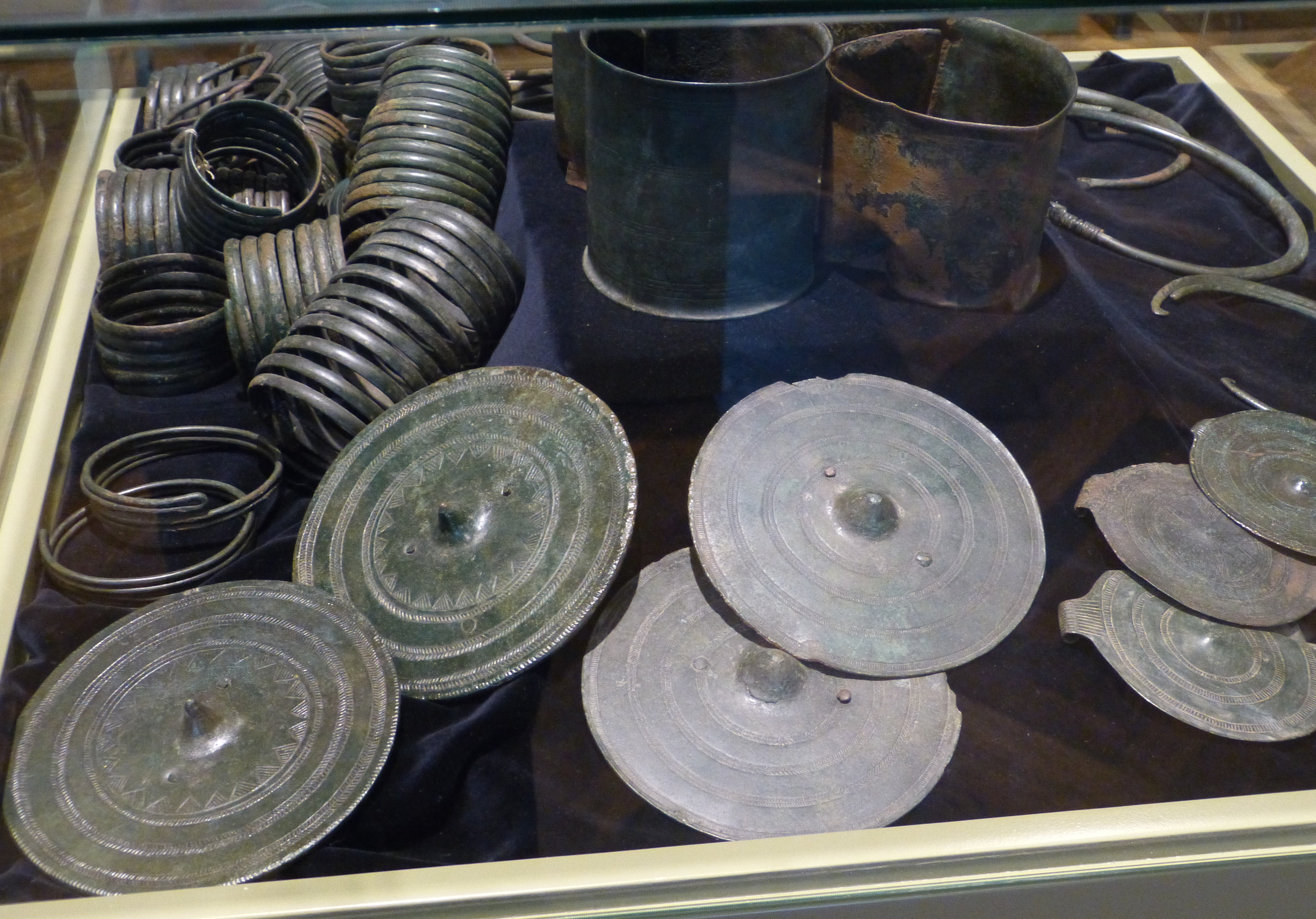
Bronze artefacts from Neudorf, Austria

The Nebra sky disc, described as 'the oldest concrete depiction of astronomical phenomena in the world', is thought to depict a calendar rule for harmonising the solar and lunar years, enabling the creation of a lunisolar calendar. The cluster of stars next to the crescent moon is thought to represent the Pleiades, known from other ancient contexts as 'calendar stars', whilst the gold arcs on the edge of the disc (one of which is now missing) represent the angle between the solstices at the latitude where the disc was found. This feature also appears in a different form on the Bush Barrow gold lozenge from Stonehenge, dating from c. 1900 BC, which was found at approximately the same latitude. The number of stars on the disc (32, or 33 if the sun is included) may represent the equivalence of 32 solar years to 33 lunar years. According to the archaeologist Christoph Sommerfeld, the disc may also encode knowledge of the 19-year lunisolar Metonic cycle.

According to the archaeologist Harald Meller, the Nebra disc allowed for "an extremely accurate positing of time, including even the capacity for predicting lunar eclipses". As such, it represents "the establishment of a new temporal order" by elites of the Únětice culture and thereby "demonstrates their claim to state power".

The site on the Mittelberg hill where the Nebra disc was found is thought to have served as an enclosed 'sacred precinct', delimited by earthen ramparts on two sides of the hill. From this location, when the disc is aligned to the north, the upper terminus of the western gold arc points towards the Brocken mountain, where the sun is seen to set on the summer solstice (21 June). Another distinctive marker on the horizon is the Kulpenberg hill, where the sun sets on 1 May (Beltane), a date also marked by the Pömmelte enclosure.

Other depictions of the Pleiades are known from rock carvings dating from the early Bronze Age, such as at Mont Bégo in the southern Alps and on a 'Calendar Stone' at Leodagger in Austria, which was part of a cult site associated with the Únětice culture.

== Influence of the Únětice tradition ==
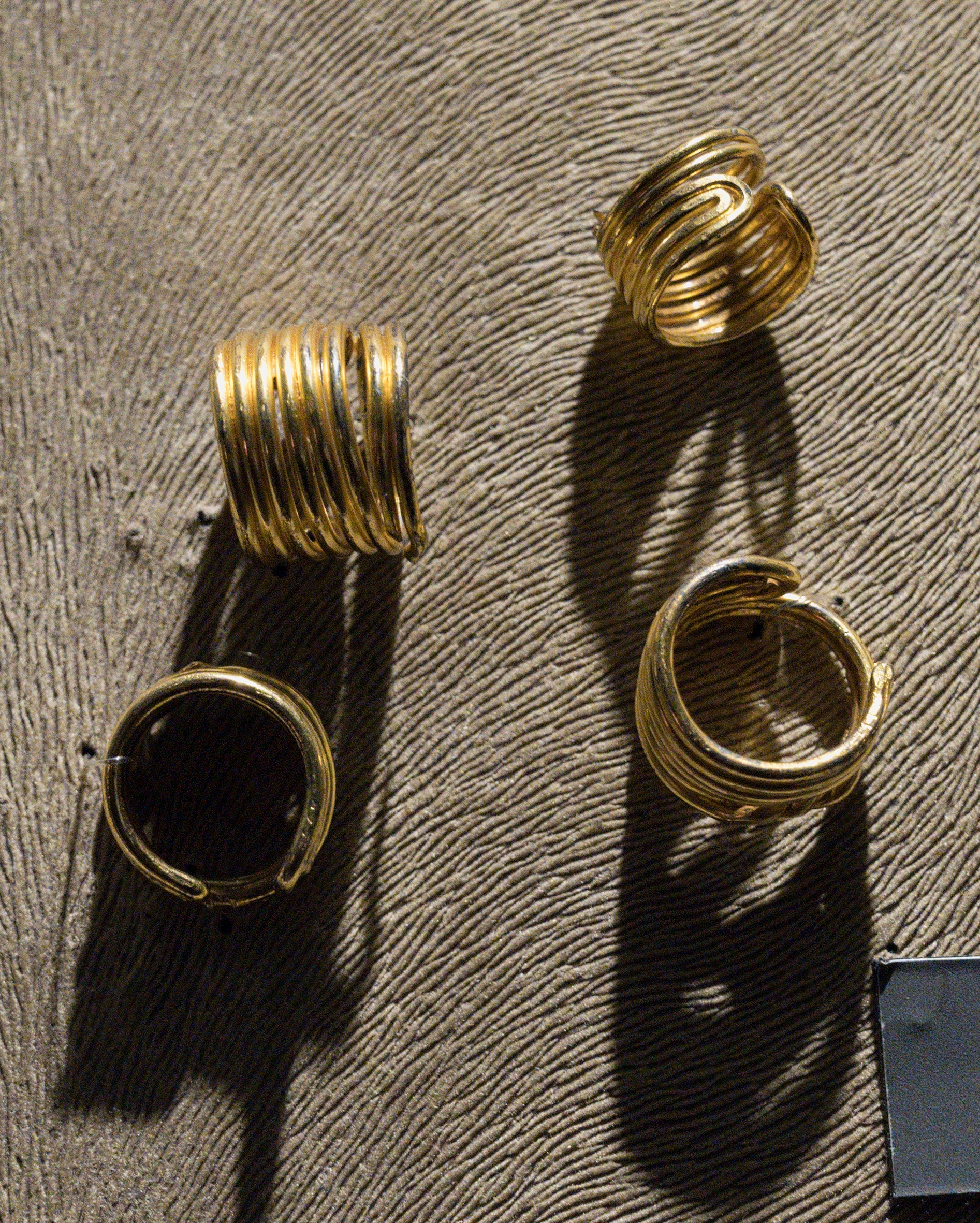
Gold spiral lock rings, Czech Republic

The Únětice culture is considered to be part of a wider pan-European cultural phenomenon, arising gradually between the second half of the 3rd millennium and the beginning of the 2nd. According to Dalia Pokutta, "The role of the Únětice Culture in the formation of Bronze Age Europe cannot be overrated. The rise and the existence of this original, expansive and dynamic population mark one of the most interesting moments in European prehistory." The influence of this culture covered much larger areas mainly due to intensive exchange. Únětice pottery and bronze objects are thus found in Britain, Ireland, Scandinavia, and Italy, as well as the Balkans.

The strong impact of Úněticean metallurgical centres and pottery-making traditions can be seen in other EBA groups, for example, in the Adlerberg, Straubing, Singen, Neckar-Ries, and Upper-Rhine groups in Germany and Switzerland, as well as the Unterwölbling and Gáta–Wieselburg in Austria. The Nitra group, inhabiting southern Slovakia, not only precedes the Únětice culture chronologically but is also strongly culturally related to it. All of these groups are alternatively seen as local variants of a broader Únětice culture. According to Marija Gimbutas these cultures were, in a broad sense, "one unit", with the same burial rites, economy, habitation patterns, and pottery, which she groups together as 'early Únětice'. The Veterov culture of Moravia and the Mad'arovce culture of Slovakia are sometimes considered to be subgroups within the final Únětice tradition. According to Bernard Sergent (1995), the Polada culture in northern Italy and the Rhône culture in France and Switzerland also represent southern variants of the Únětice culture. In later times, some elements of the Úněticean pottery-making traditions can be found in the Trzciniec culture as well.

== Genetics ==
Haak et al. 2015 examined the remains of eight individuals of the Únětice culture buried in modern-day Germany c. 2200–1800 BC. The three samples of Y-DNA extracted belonged to Y-haplogroups I2a2, I2c2, and I2, while the eight samples of mtDNA extracted were determined to belong to haplogroup I3a (two samples), U5a1, W3a1, U5b2a1b, H4a1a1, H3, and V. The examined Únětice individuals were found to be very closely related to peoples of the earlier Yamnaya, Bell Beaker, and Corded Ware cultures. Their amount of steppe-related ancestry is comparable to that of some modern Europeans.

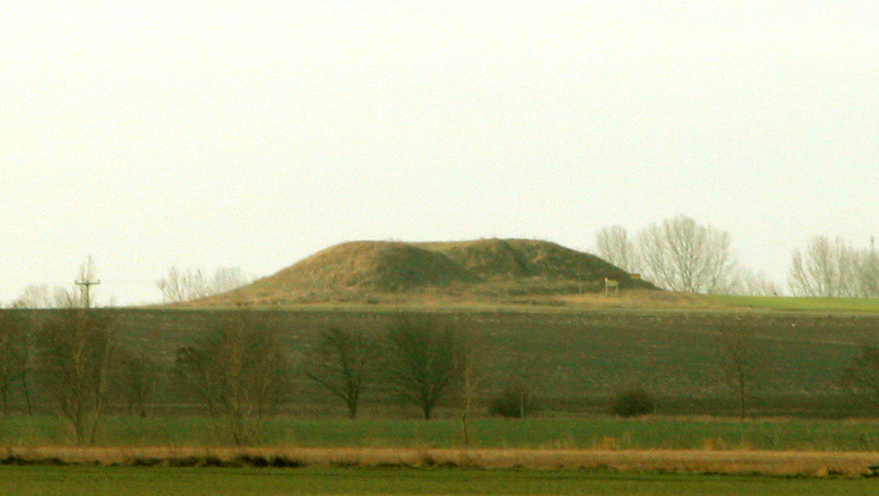
The Leubingen tumulus

Allentoft et al. 2015 examined the remains of seven individuals of the Únětice culture buried in modern-day Poland and Czechia from c. 2300–1800 BC. The seven samples of mtDNA extracted were determined to belong to haplogroups U4, U2e1f1, H6a1b, U5a1b1, K1a4a1, T2b, and K1b1a. An additional male from the late Corded Ware culture or early Únětice culture in Łęki Małe, Poland, of c. 2300–2000 BC, was found to be a carrier of the paternal haplogroup R1b1a and the maternal haplogroup T2e. It was found that the people of the Corded Ware culture, Bell Beaker culture, Únětice culture, and Nordic Bronze Age were genetically very similar to one another and displayed a significant amount of genetic affinity with the Yamnaya culture.

Papac et al. (2021) tested some more individuals from the Únětice burial sites: there, the Y-chromosome results (not including two by low-coverage samples) were: 1 G2a2b2a, 1 I2a1, 8 I2a2, 7 R1a-Z645, and 8 R1b-P312. The geneticists found that: "The Y-chromosomal data suggest an even larger turnover. A decrease of Y-lineage R1b-P312 from 100% (in late Bell Beaker Culture) to 20% (in preclassical Únětice) implies a minimum 80% influx of new Y-lineages at the onset of the Early Bronze Age". The autosomal results even point to a migration from the northeast, which the authors can link with the arrival of R1a-Z645, previously found in the Baltic region.

Several individuals from two burial sites in Prague were tested in 2022 (both sites were used in different cultural periods). The male Y-DNA haplogroups from individuals assigned to the Únětice period were: two R1a1a1 (Z280) and eight I2a2a (I6635); with one individual with the derived clade PF3885, a tested male, being I2a-L38; four males had the R1b-L2 haplogroup (another tested individual had the derived R1b-L20 clade); a male had the haplogroup R1b-Y153322, which is under DF27.

== Gallery ==
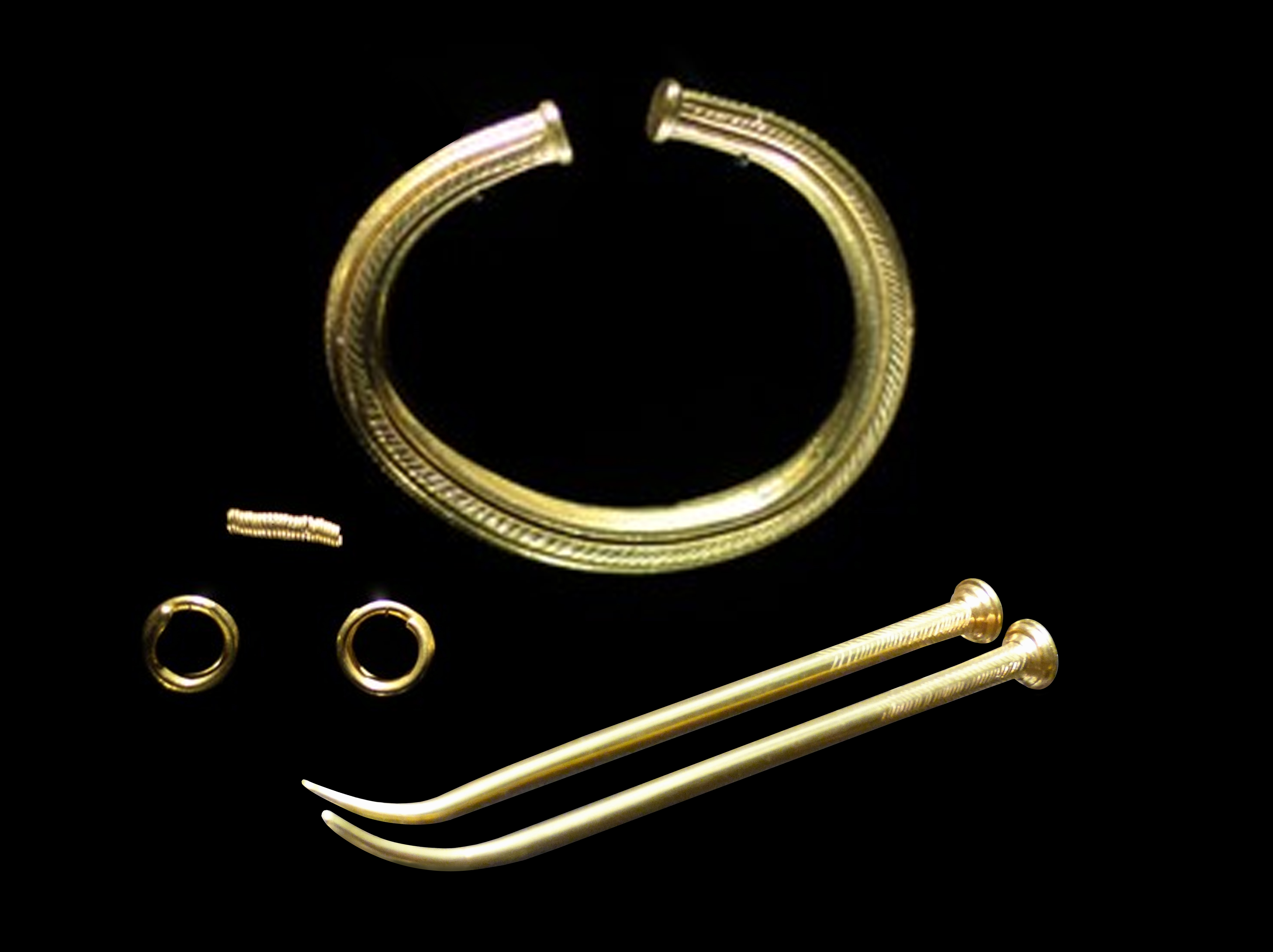
Gold artefacts from the Leubingen barrow

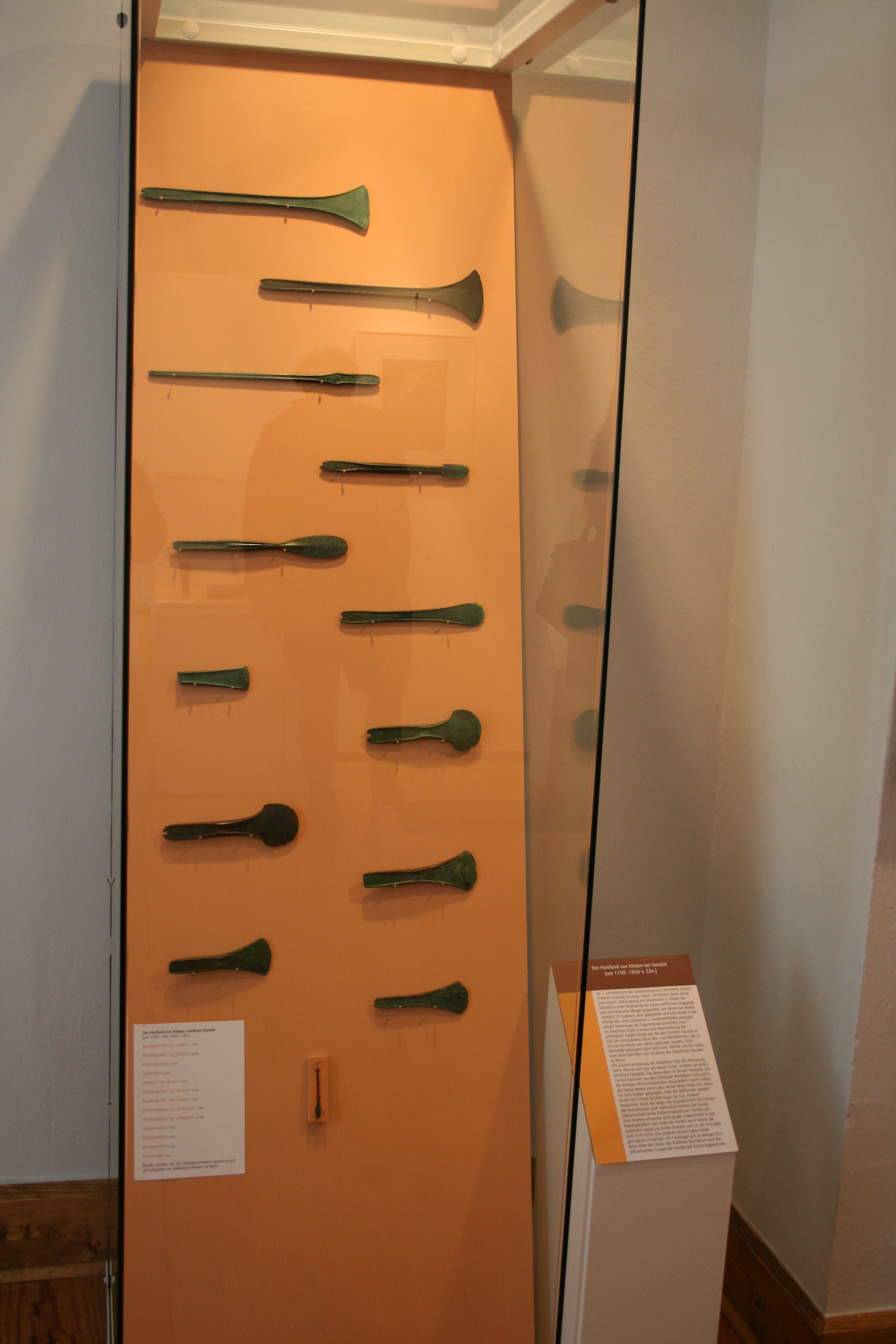
Bronze axes

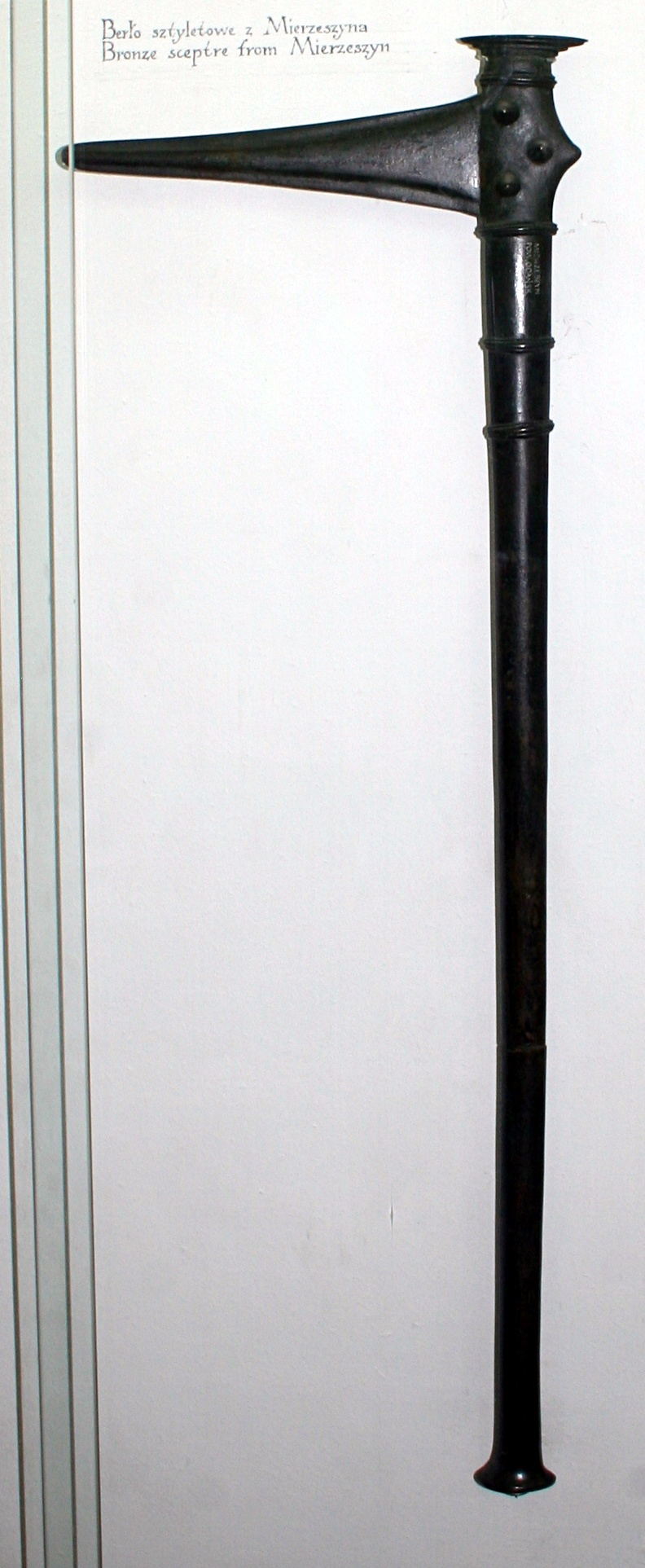
Bronze halberd, Poland

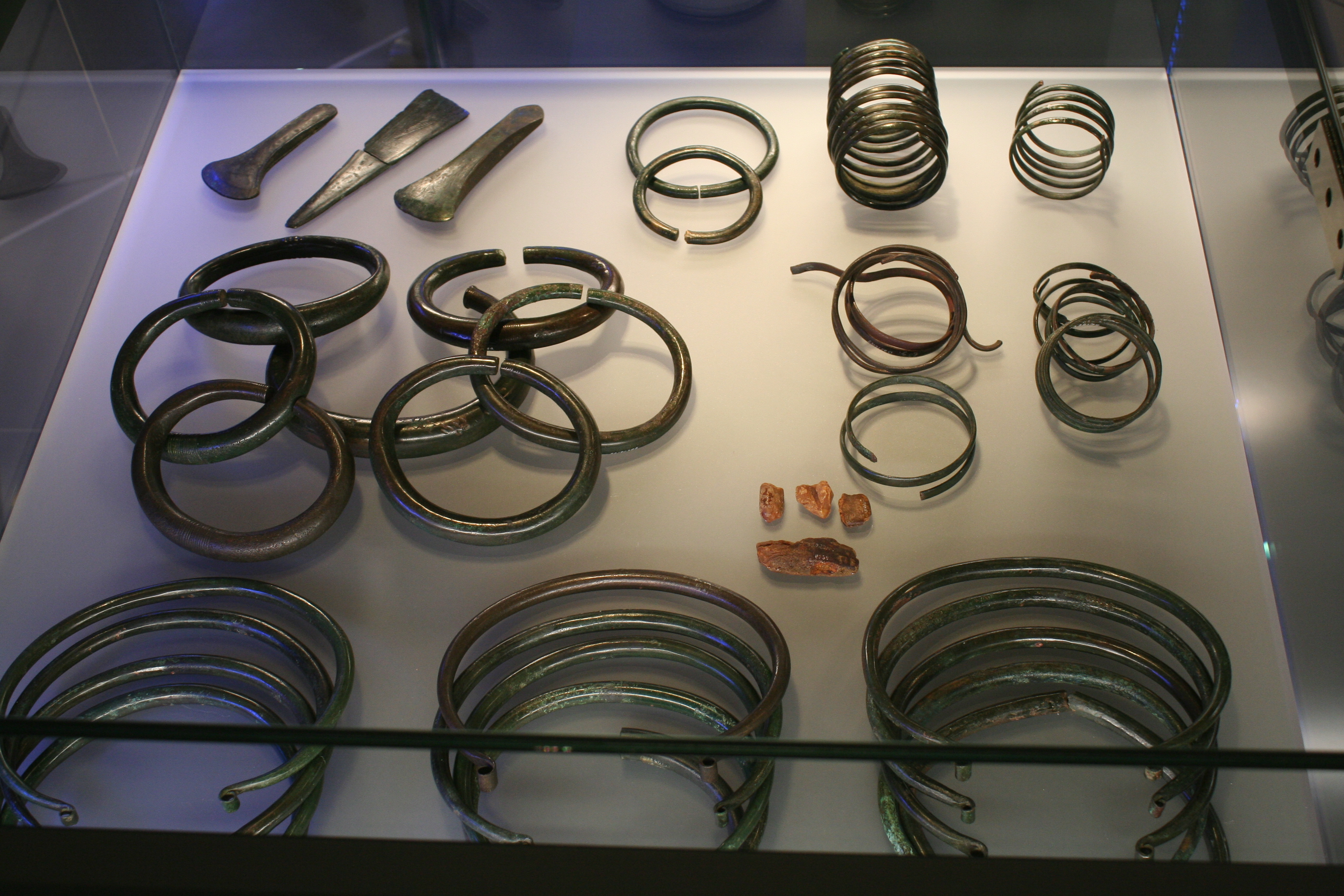
Ingots, rings, tools, spirals, amber, Germany

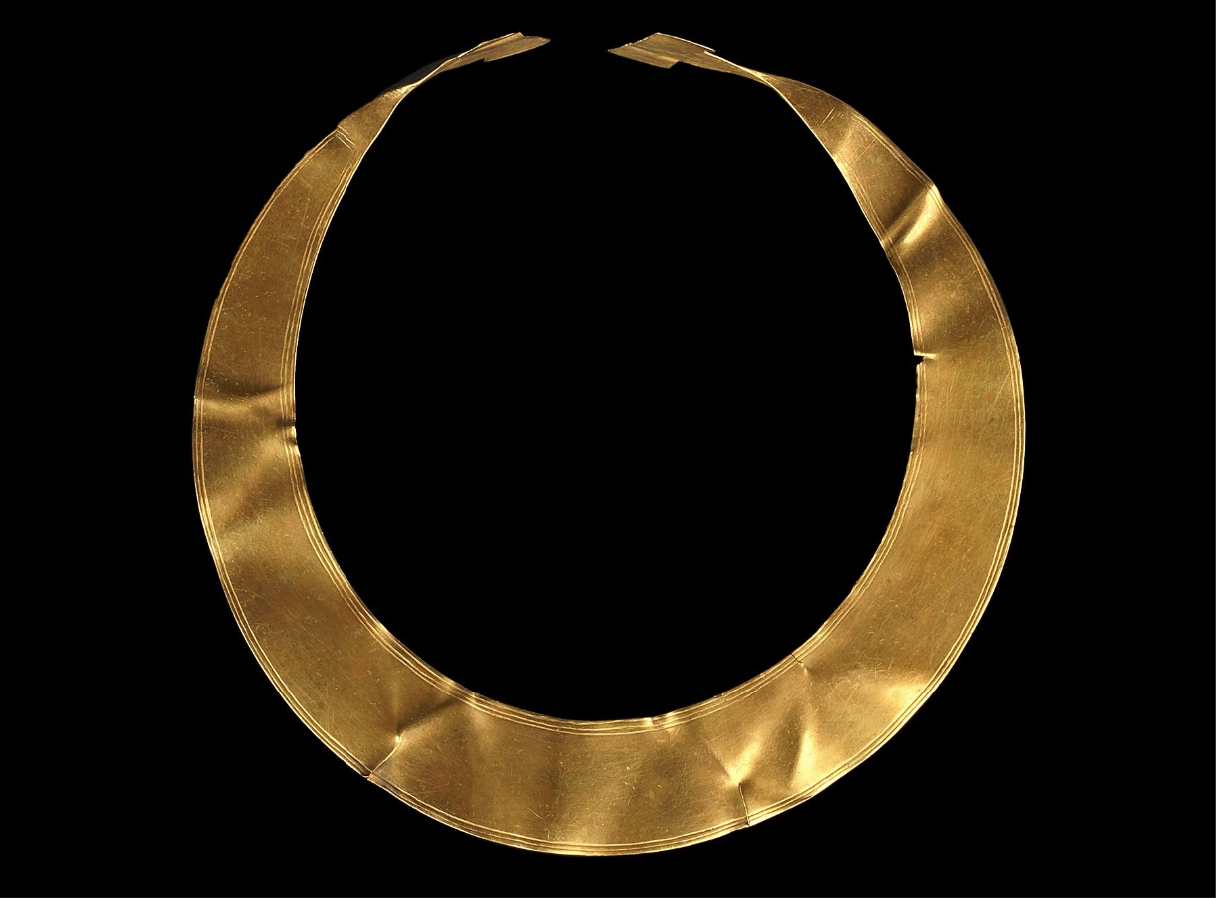
Gold lunula from Schulenberg. Germany

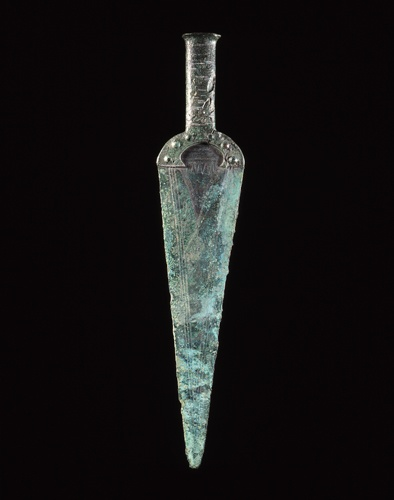
Dagger of hybrid Únětice/Rhône type.

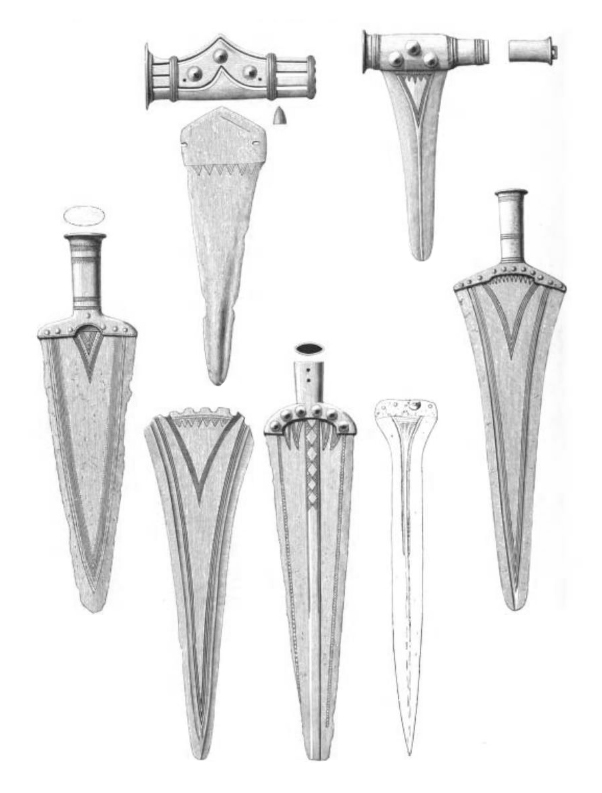
Daggers, halberds, and swords, Germany, c. 2000 BC

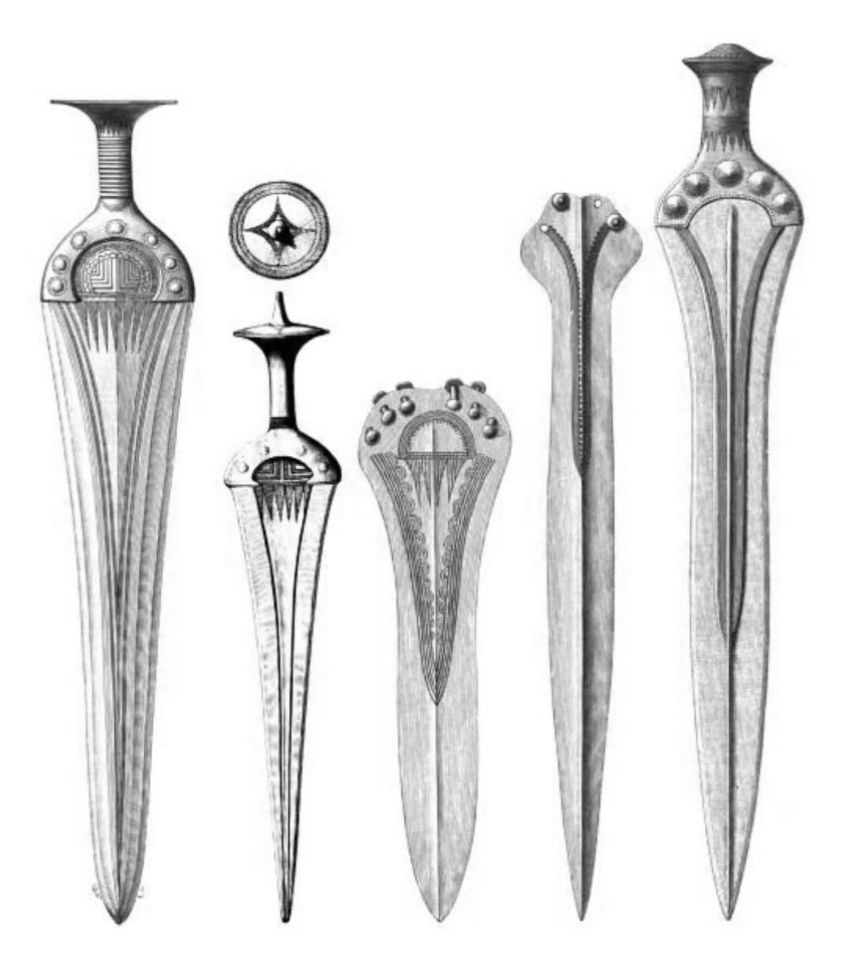
Bronze swords, c. 1600 BC

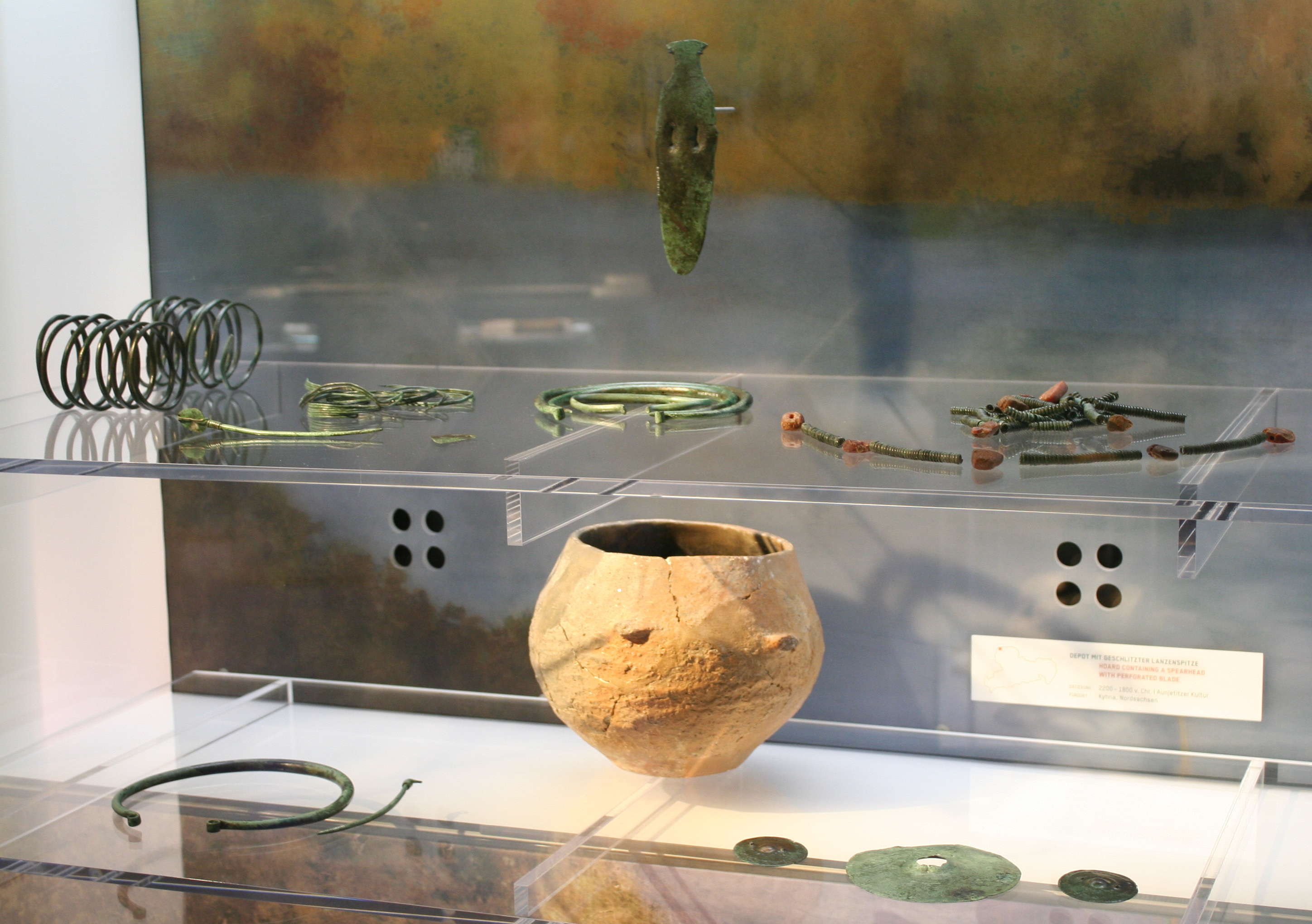
Bronze and amber from Kyhna, Germany

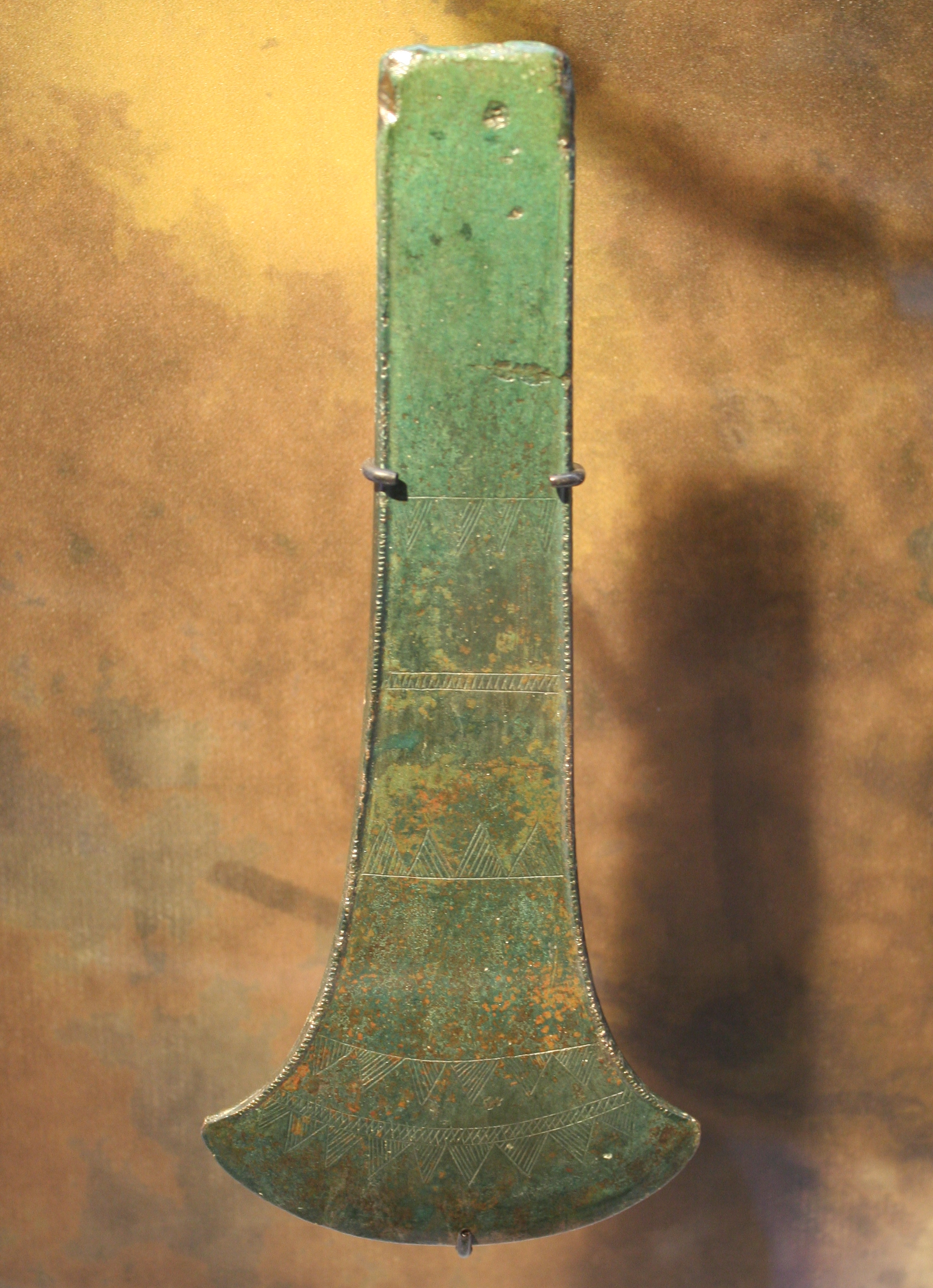
Bronze axe

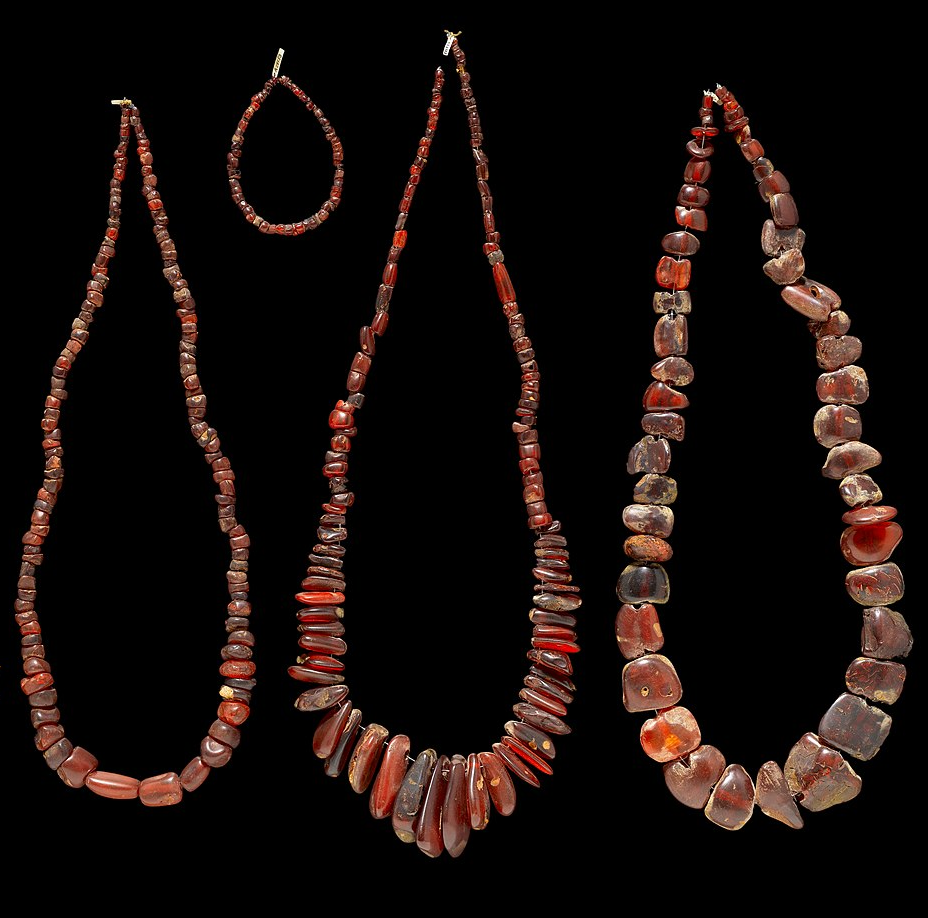
Baltic amber

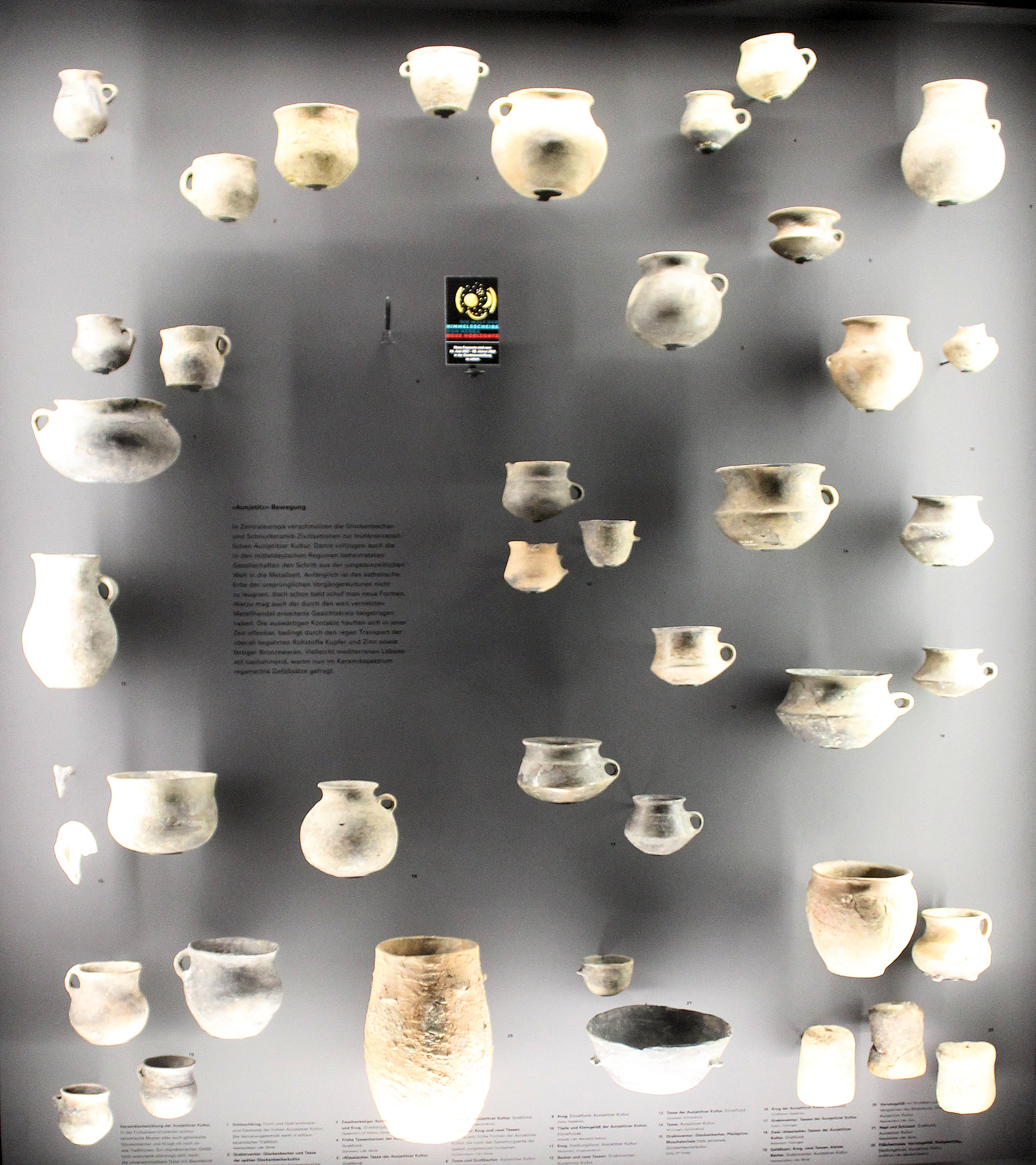
Pottery

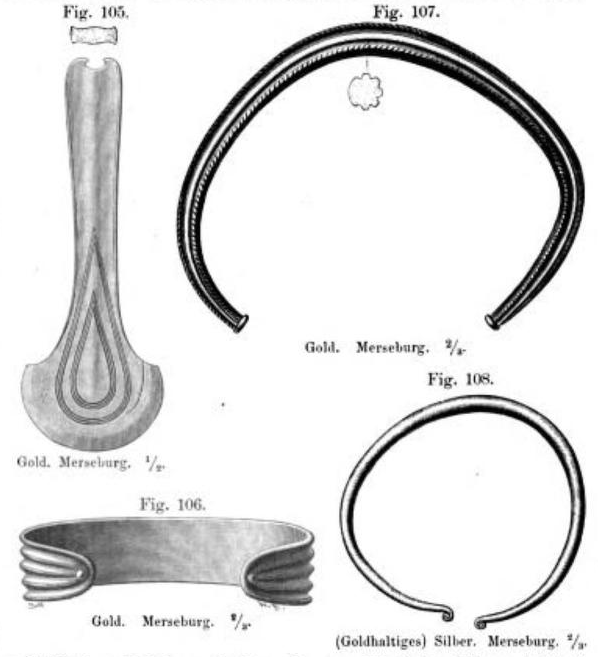
Gold and silver artefacts from Dieskau, Germany

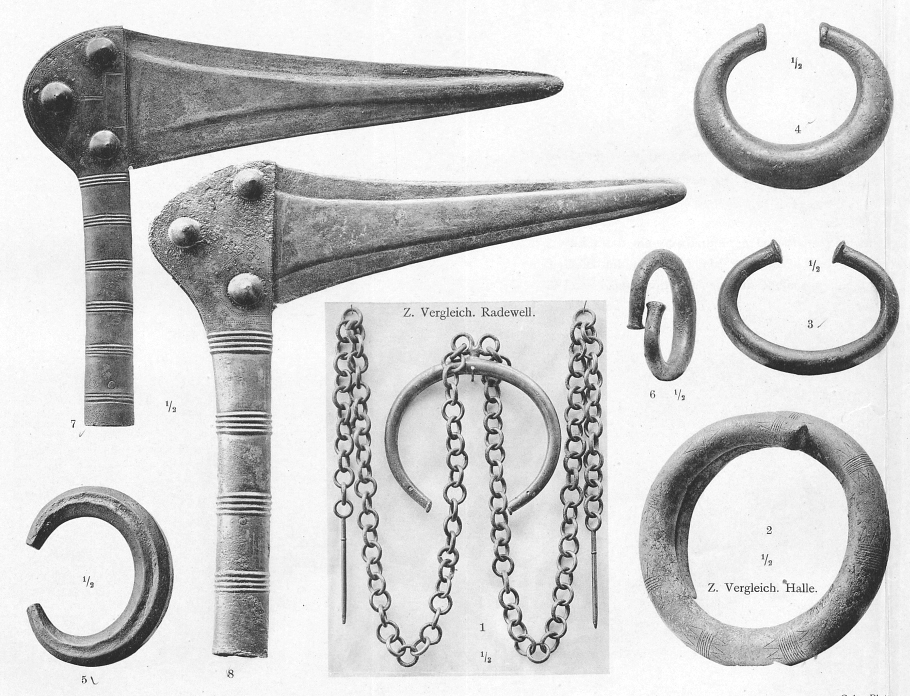
Bronze artefacts, Dieskau II hoard, 2000–1700 BC

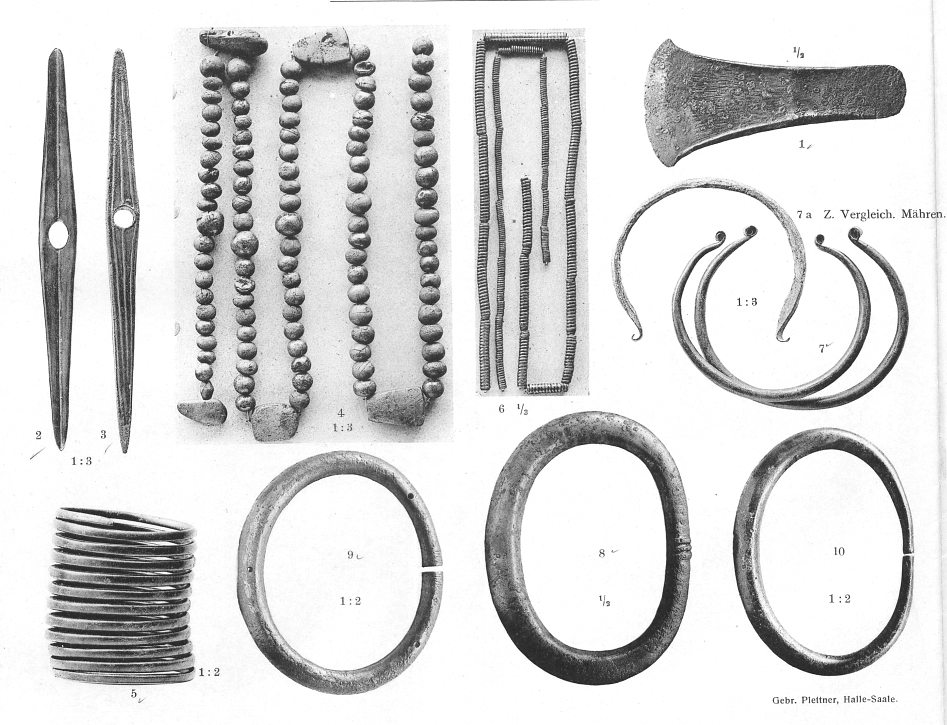
Bronze and amber artefacts, Dieskau II

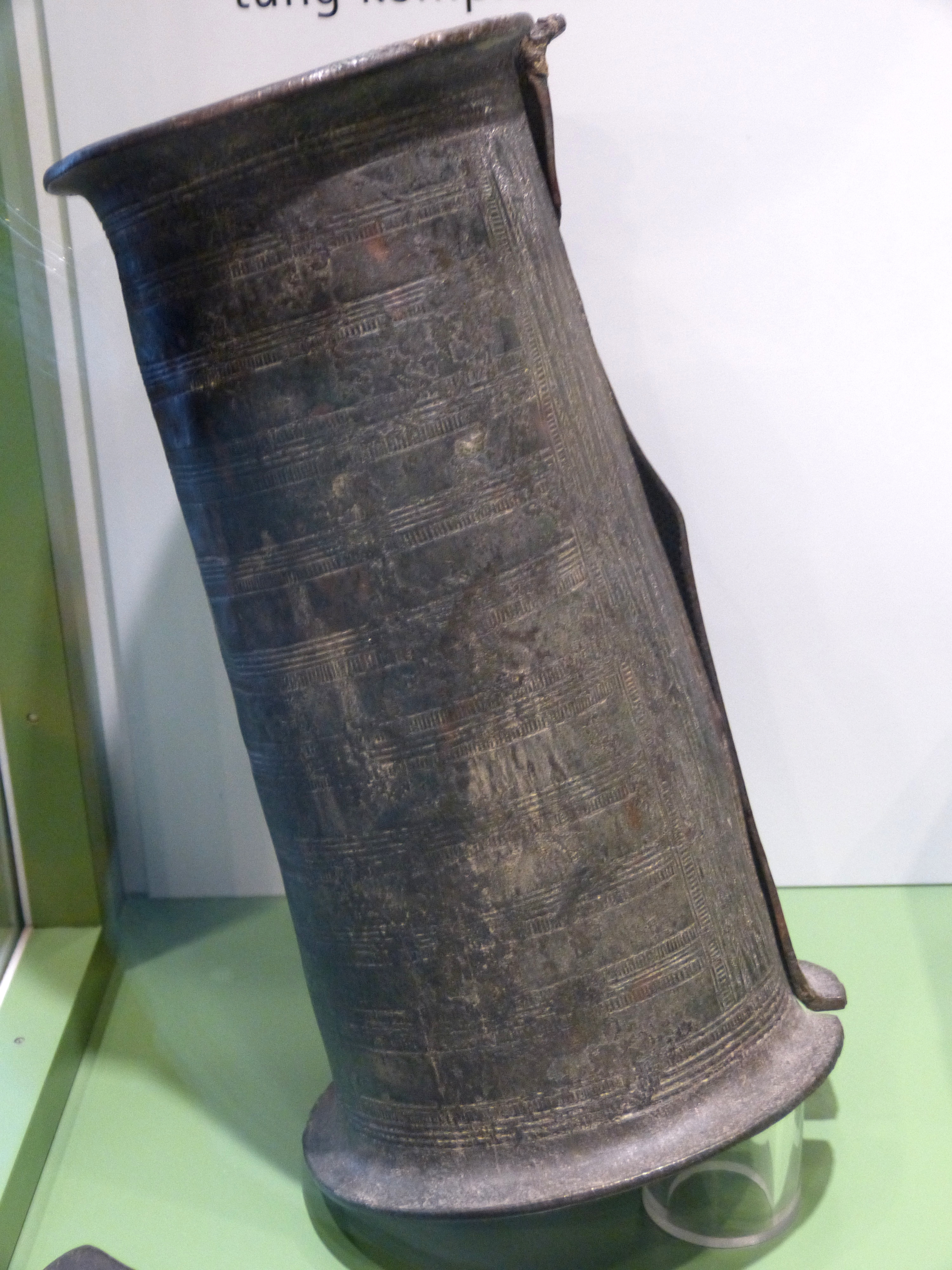
Bronze armband, Austria

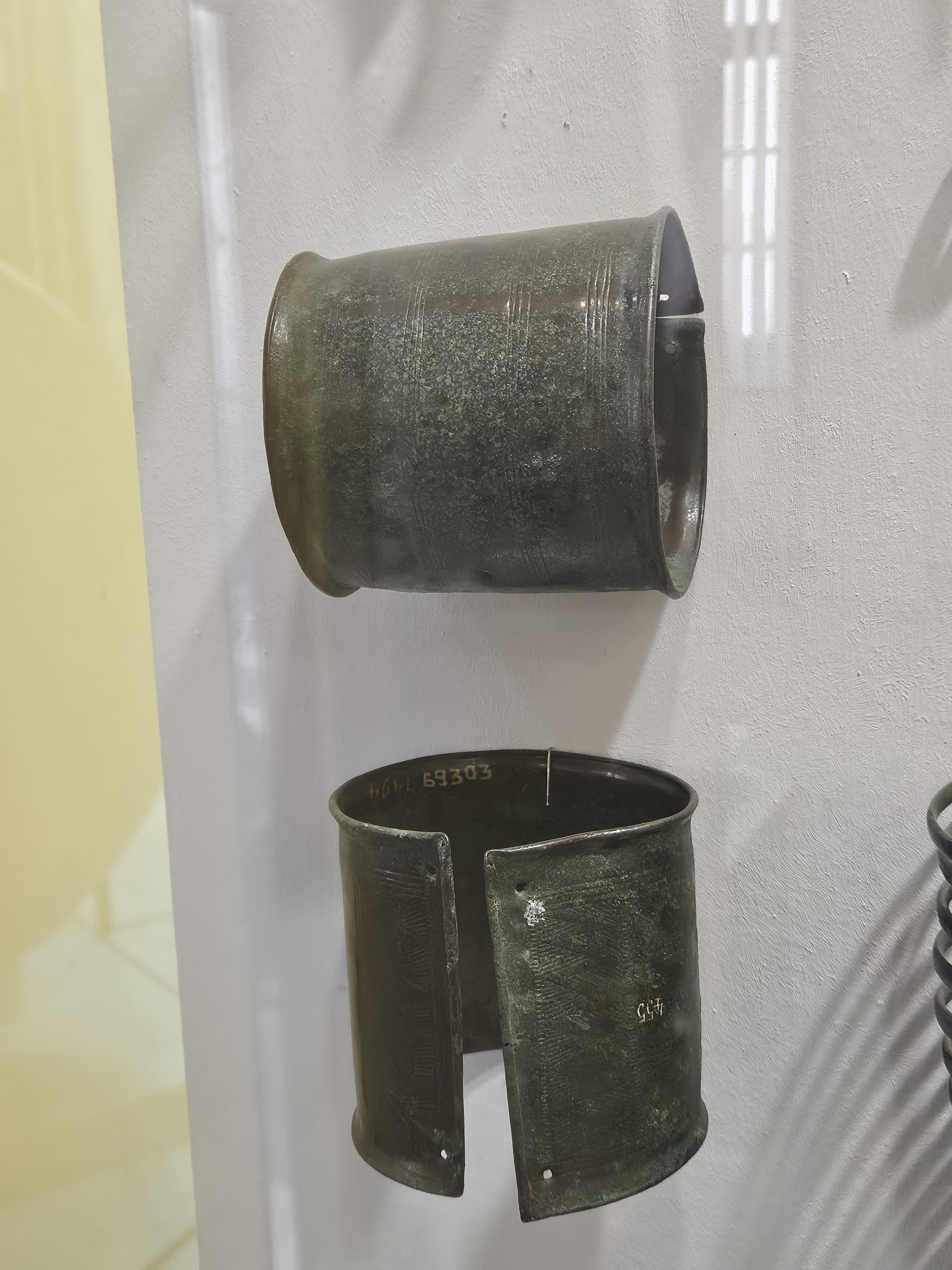
Bronze bracelets, Czechia

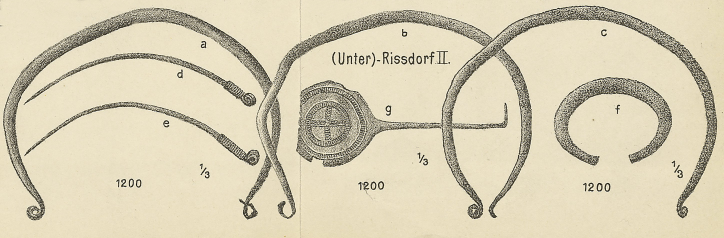
Bronze rings and clothing pins with a sun cross symbol

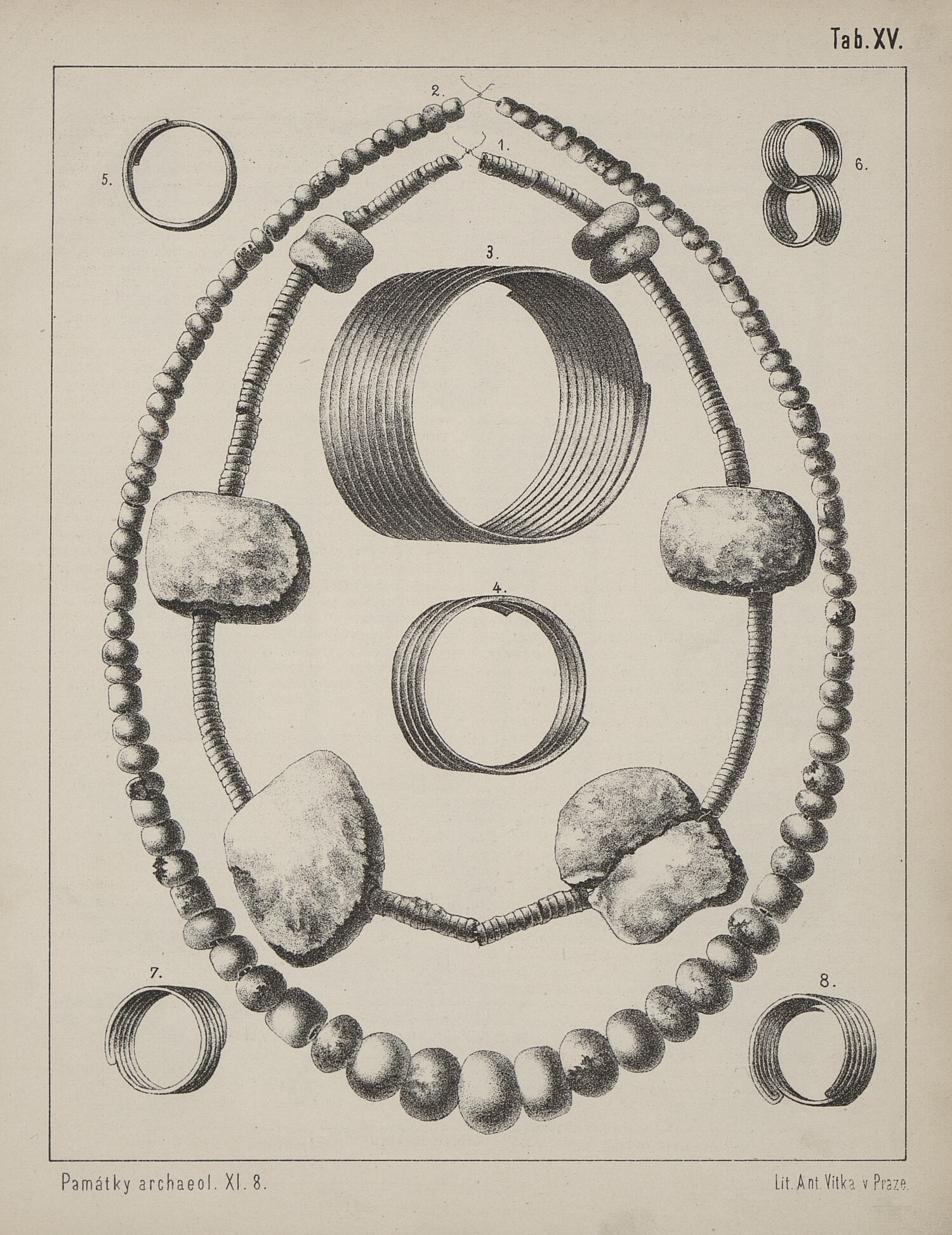
Amber and bronze jewellery from Únětice

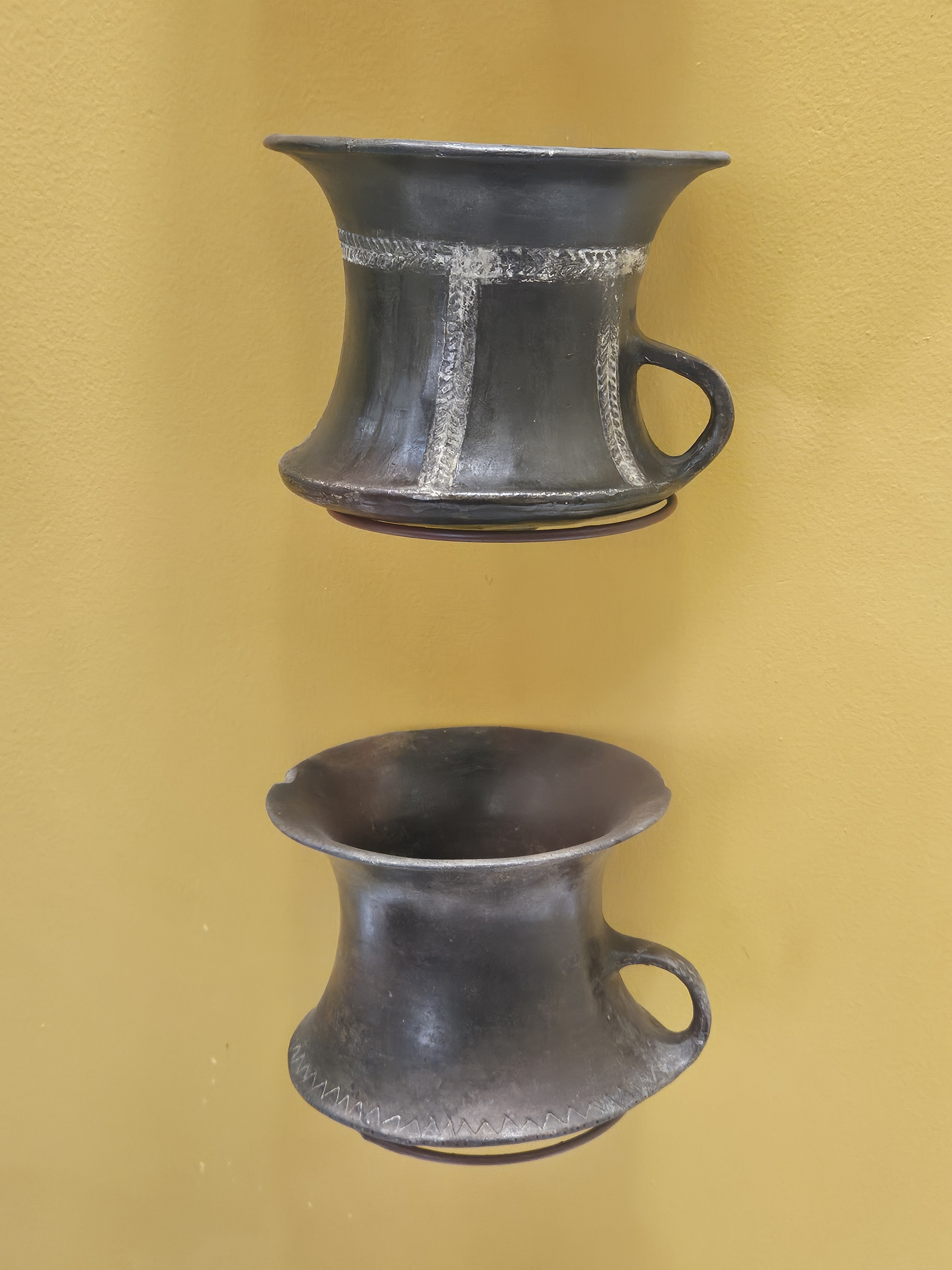
Pottery from Czechia

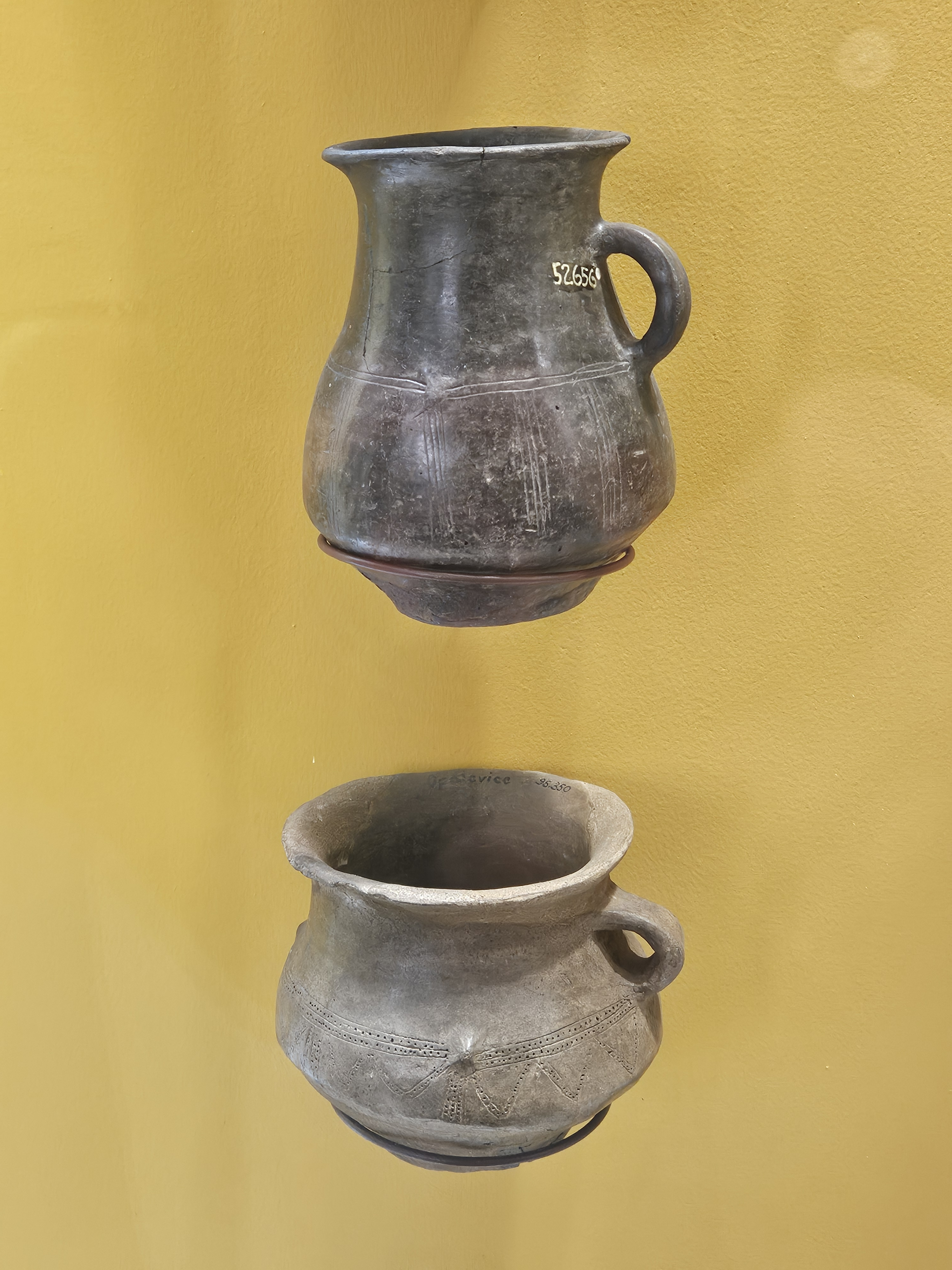
Pottery from Czechia

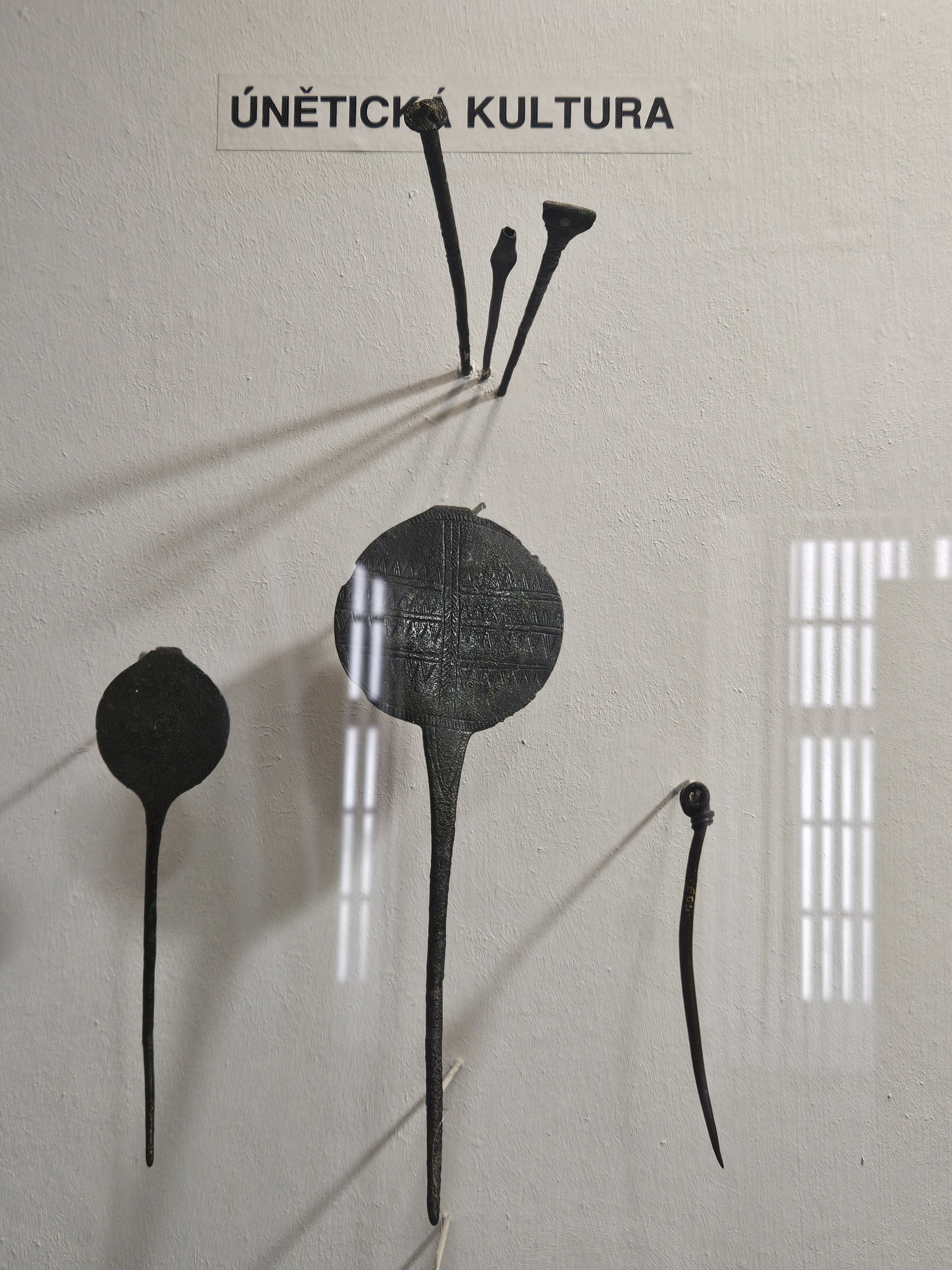
Clothing pins, Czechia

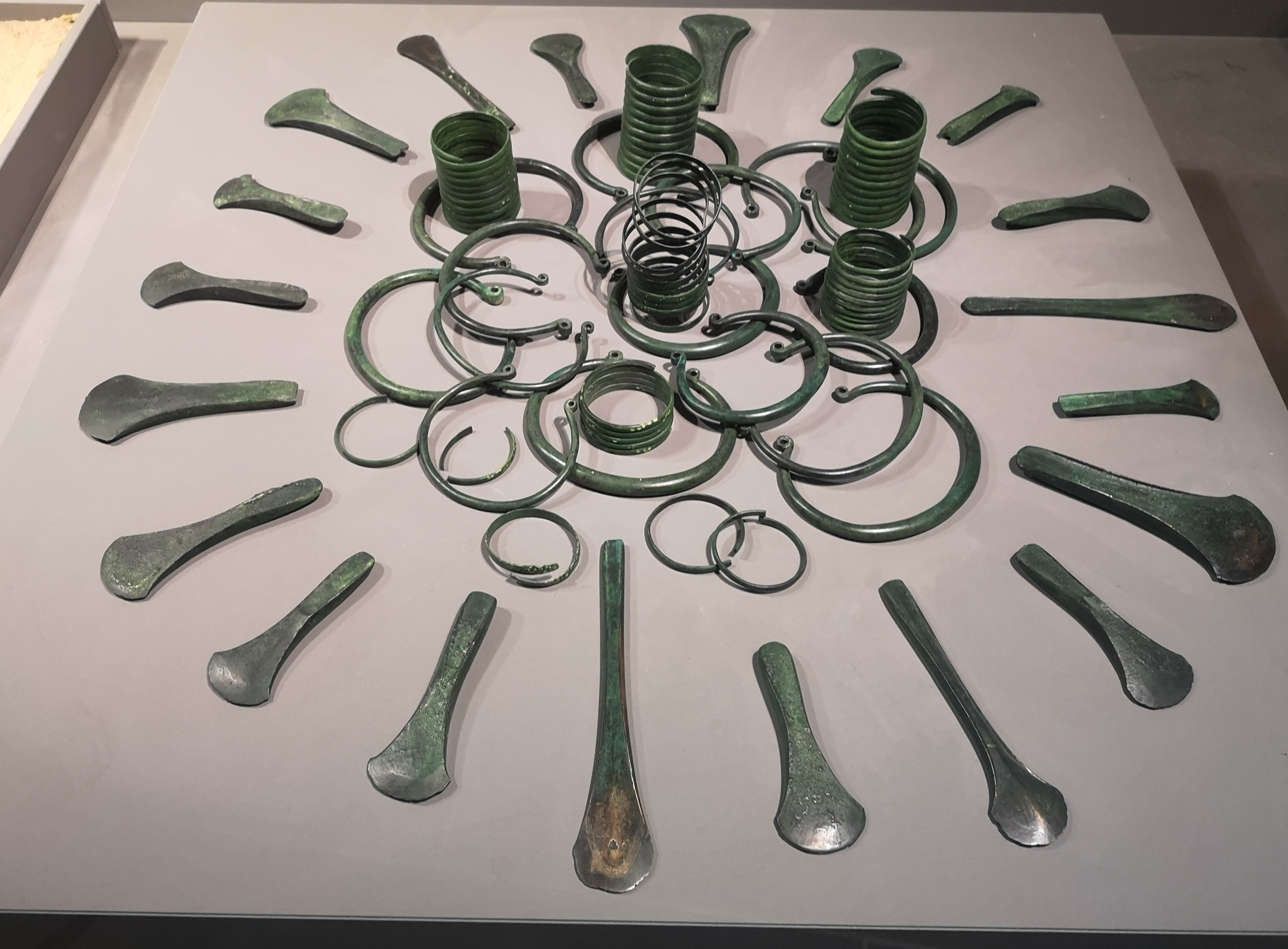
Hoard from Pilszcz, Poland

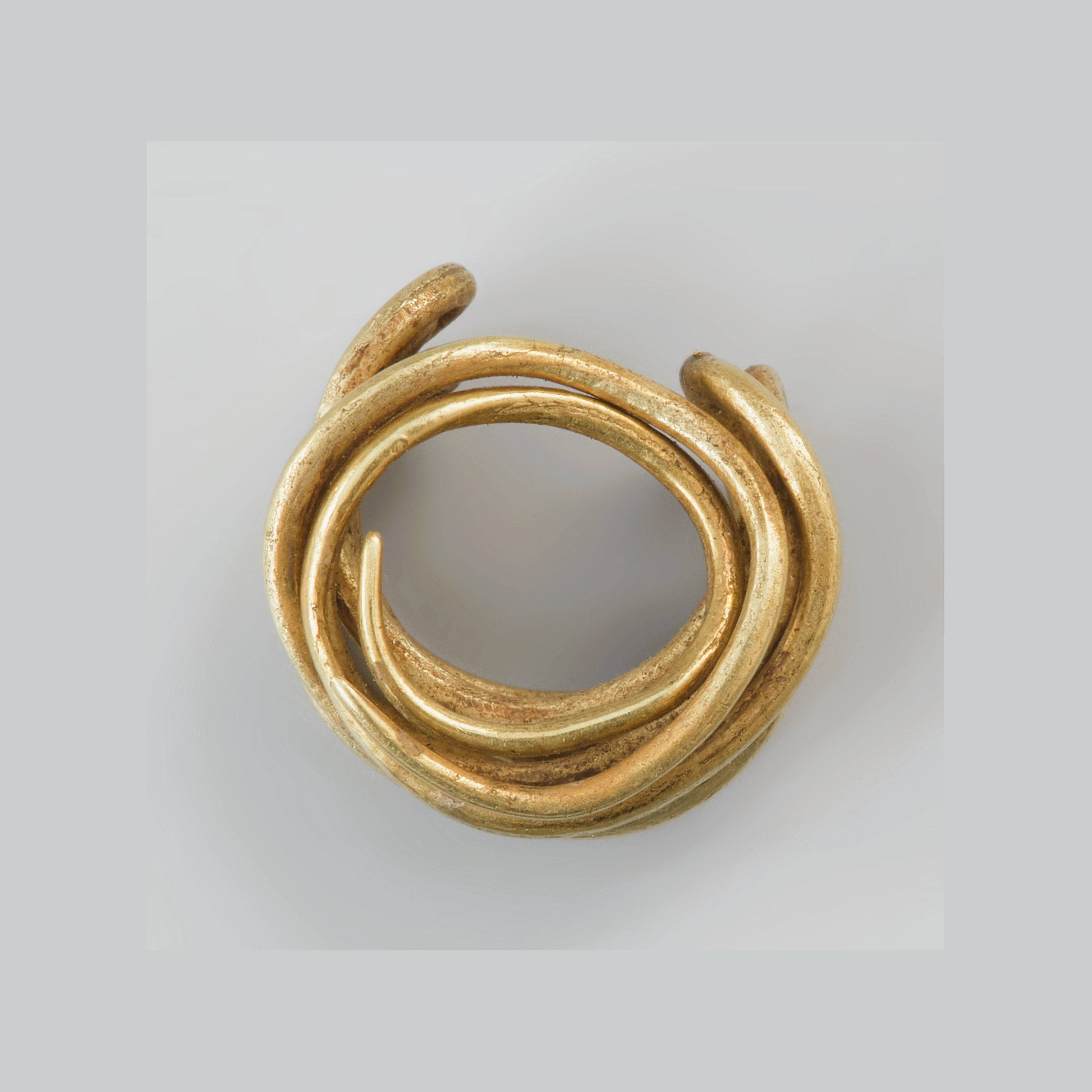
Gold ring from Barwice, Poland

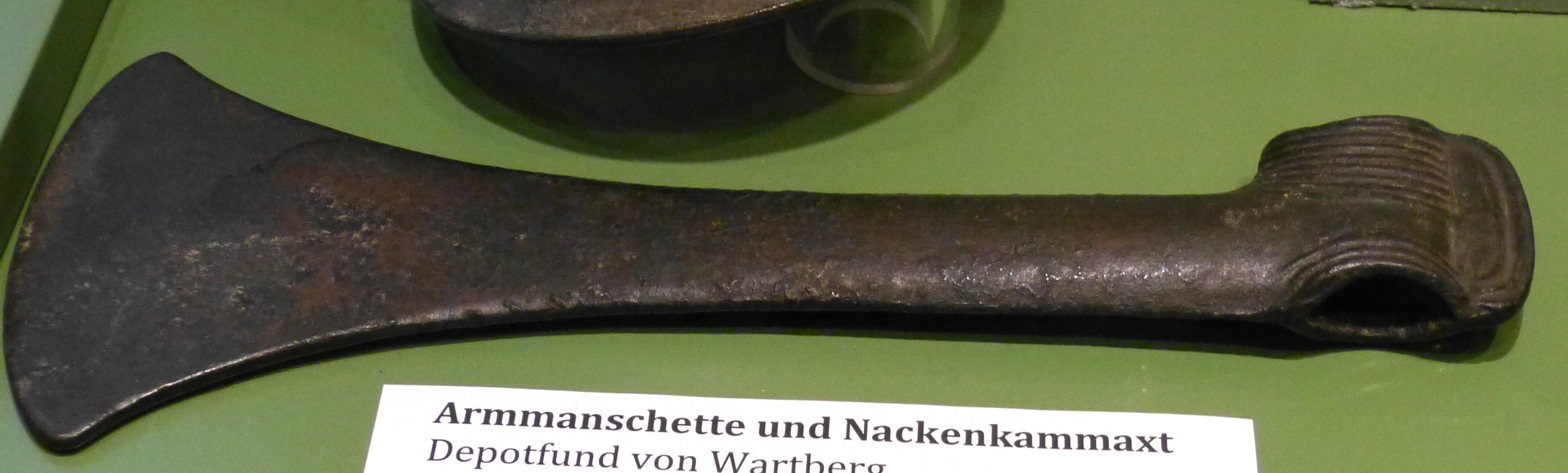
Bronze axe, Austria

== See also ==
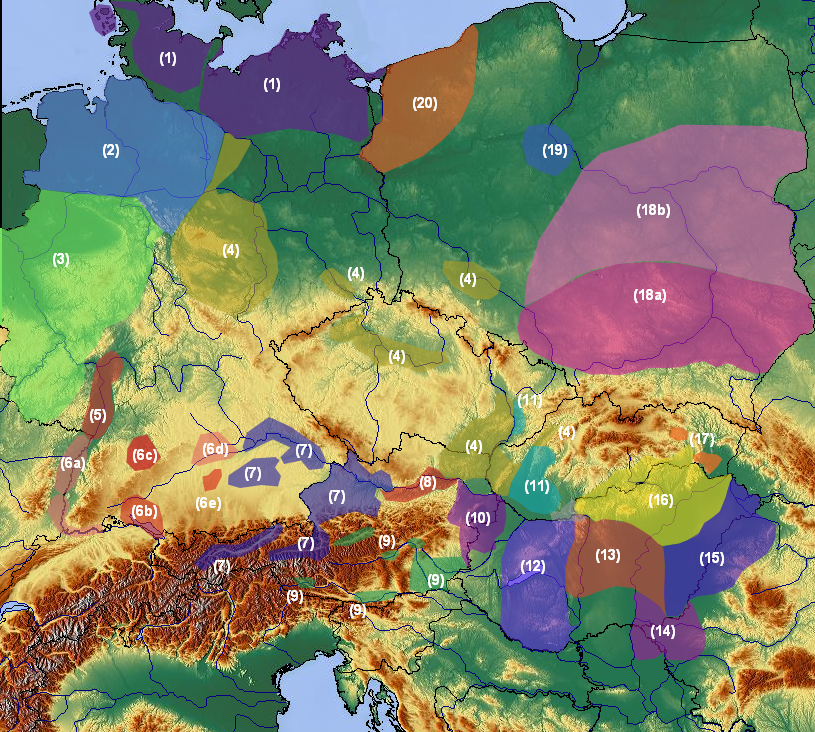
Early Bronze Age cultures, 2200–2000 BC (click on image for more details)

- Deposit finds of the Aunjetitz culture
- Armorican Tumulus culture
- Nordic Bronze Age
- Argaric culture
- Sintashta culture
- Catacomb culture
- Abashevo culture
- Ottomány culture
- Wietenberg culture
- Polada culture
- Cetina culture
- Castellieri culture
- Helladic culture
- The Collection of Pre- and Protohistoric Artifacts at the University of Jena

== Sources ==
- J. M. Coles/A. F. Harding, The Bronze Age in Europe (London 1979).
- Allentoft, Morten E.; et al. (10 June 2015). "Population genomics of Bronze Age Eurasia". Nature. 522 (7555). Nature Research: 167–172. Bibcode:2015Natur.522..167A. doi:10.1038/nature14507. PMID 26062507. S2CID 4399103.
- Haak, Wolfgang; et al. (2 March 2015). "Massive migration from the steppe was a source for Indo-European languages in Europe". Nature. 522 (7555). Nature Research: 207–211. arXiv:1502.02783. Bibcode:2015Natur.522..207H. doi:10.1038/nature14317. PMC 5048219. PMID 25731166.
- Mathieson, Iain; et al. (21 February 2018). "The genomic history of southeastern Europe". Nature. 555 (7695). Nature Research: 197–203. Bibcode:2018Natur.555..197M. doi:10.1038/nature25778. PMC 6091220. PMID 29466330.
- G. Weber, Händler, Krieger, Bronzegießer (Kassel 1992).
- R. Krause, Die endneolithischen und frühbronzezeitlichen Grabfunde auf der Nordterrasse von Singen am Hohentwiel (Stuttgart 1988).
- B. Cunliffe (ed.), The Oxford illustrated prehistory of Europe (Oxford, Oxford University Press 1994).
