= Levantine Bronze Age =

Culture of eastern Spain, 2200–1500 BC

Levantine Bronze or Bronze of Levante or Valencian Bronze Age
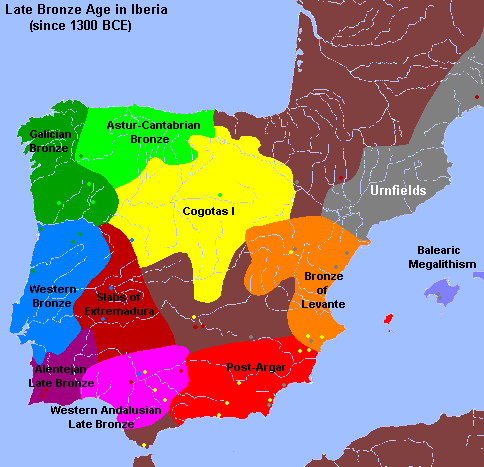
- Geographical range: East Spain
- Period: Bronze Age
- Dates: c. 2200 — c. 1500 BC
- Preceded by: Bell Beaker culture
- Followed by: Iberians
- Defined by: Miquel Tarradell

Named after its regional range, the Levantine Bronze Age (or Bronze of Levant, or Valencian Bronze) refers to a culture extended over the actual territory of the Valencian Community, in the "Levante" or eastern side of the Iberian peninsula. Its chronological range was between 2200 BC and 1500 BC.

It is considered an autonomous culture in relation to the Argaric culture by Miquel Tarradell in the sixties. The main aspects that allow the distinction of the Valencian Bronze from that of El Argar are the scarcity of metallic objects, the lack of carinated cups and ceramics, and the lack of the rite involving the inhumation of the deceased under its home floor.

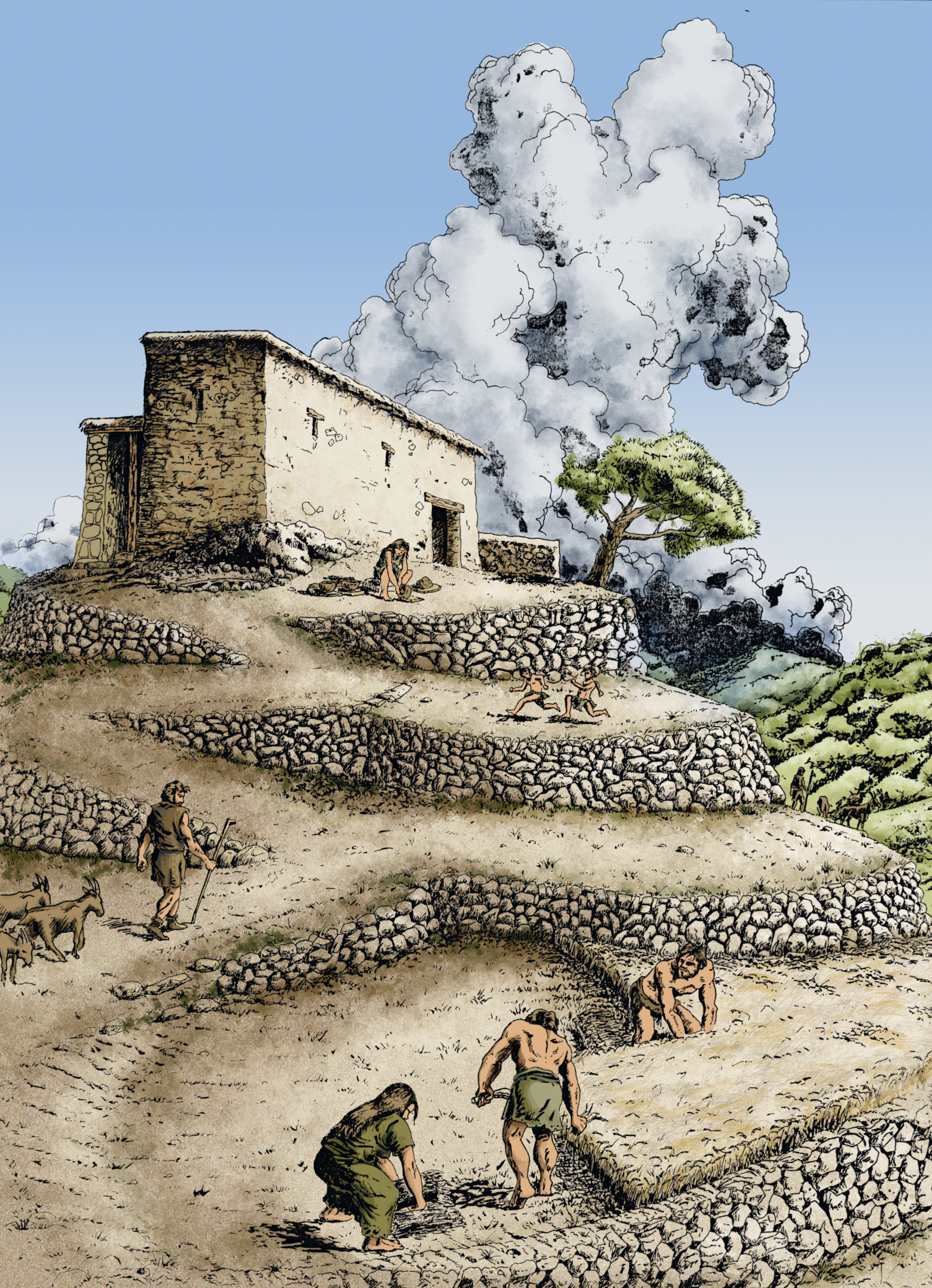
Lloma de Betxí, reconstruction

The economy was involved mainly in agriculture and herding. The metallurgy was much more developed in the southern part by the influence of the near Argaric culture.

Oppida were defended by natural elements, trenches, walls and towers. The houses were rectangular and the walls had stone basements.

Caves were used as funerary places.

== Genetic profile ==
Individuals from diverse archaeological sites were tested, a male from the barrow or collective burial mound known as Túmulo Mortòrum (Cabanes) had Y-chromosome R1b-P310, and a male inhumated in a cave near Lloma de Betxí had subclade R1b-Z195. Other individuals were tested from Cueva del Puntal de los Carniceros (Villena), Coveta del Frare (La Font de la Figuera), La Horna (Aspe) and Cabezo Redondo (Villena), belonging also to haplogroup R1b, but it is difficult to relate them to a given culture as the Vinalopó valley stands amid the Argaric culture, the Valencia Bronze Age and Motillas (or Manchego Bronze) areas.

== Gallery ==
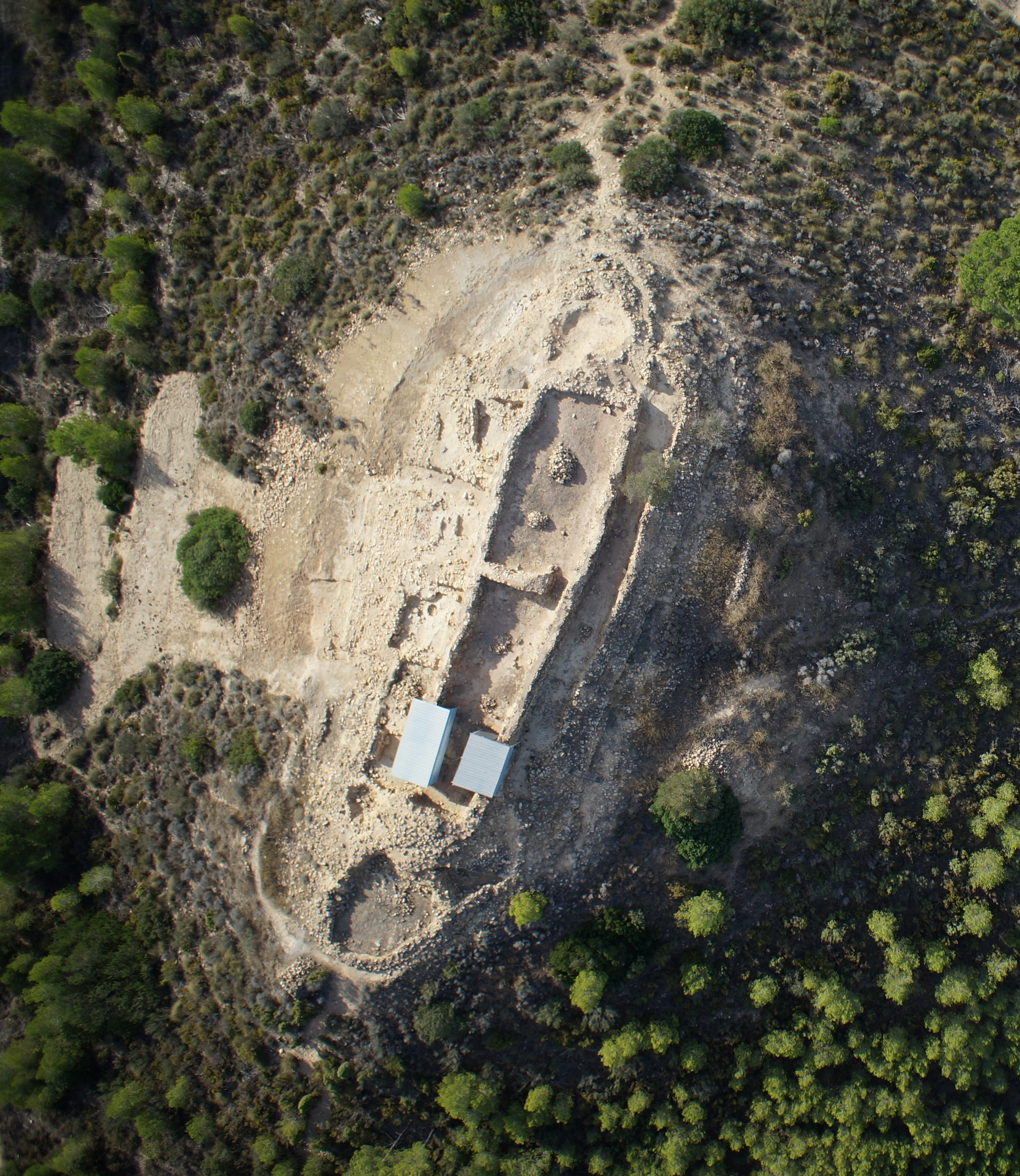
Lloma de Betxí site (Paterna)

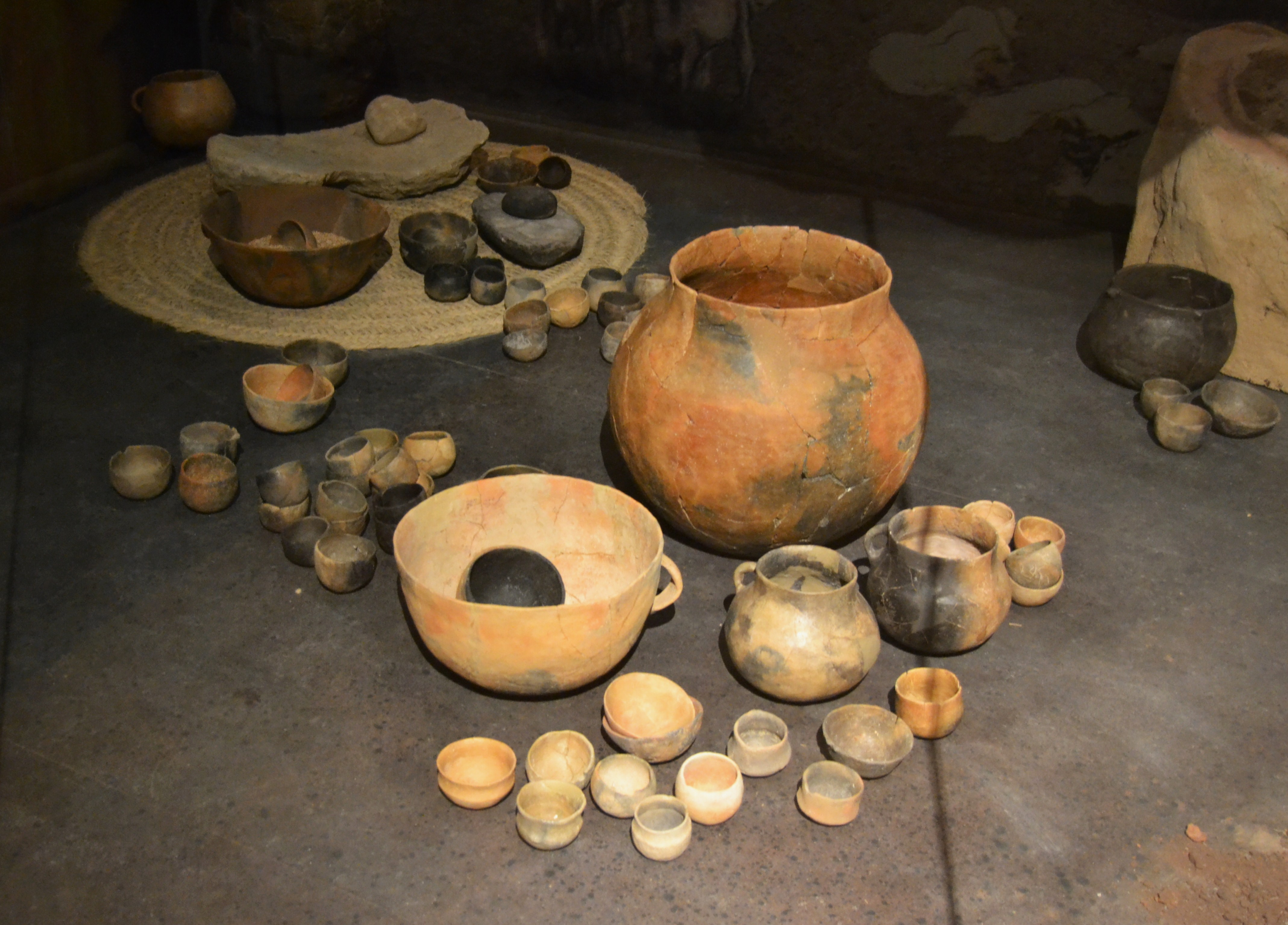
Ceramics found in Lloma de Betxí

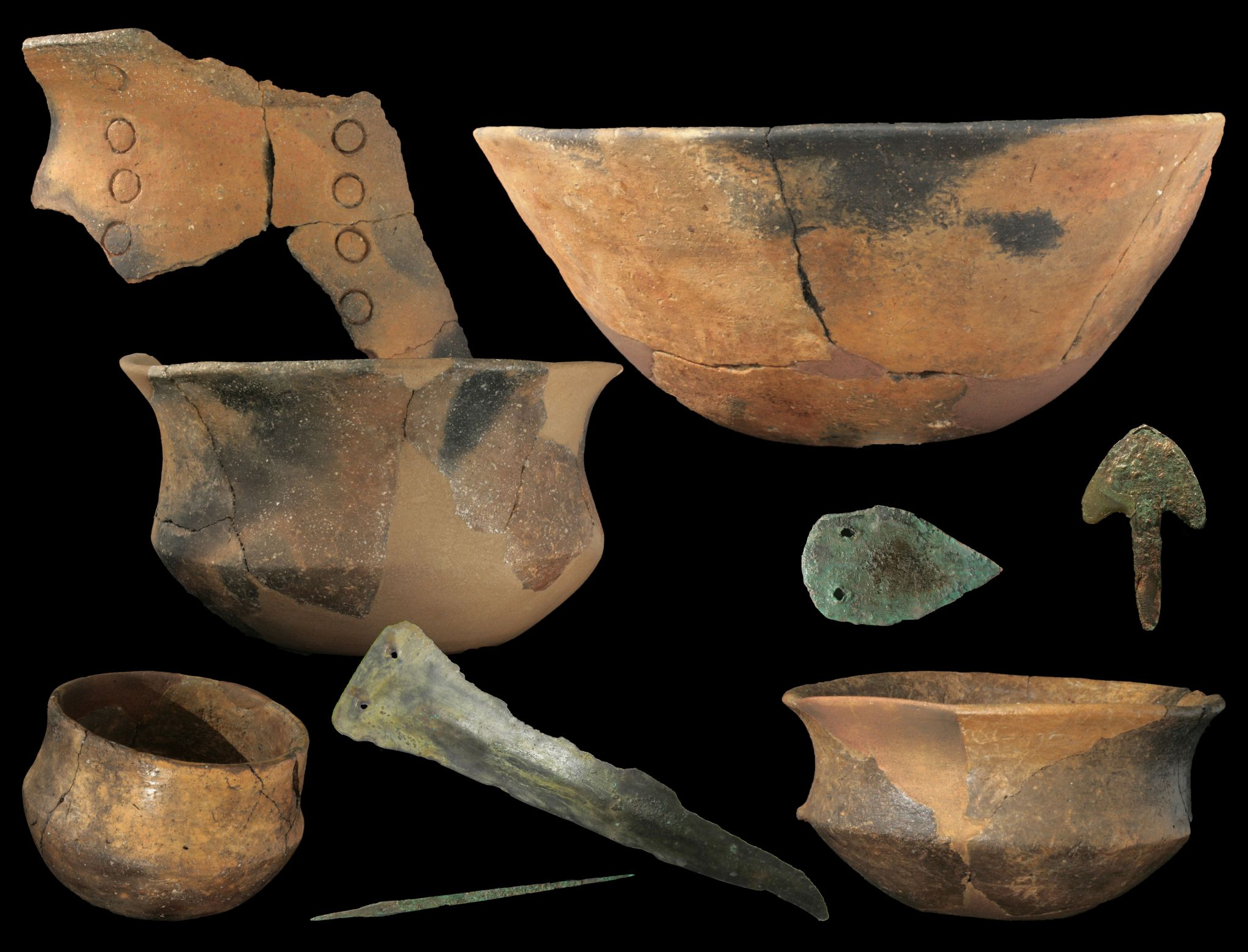
Some findings from Tossal del Mortórum

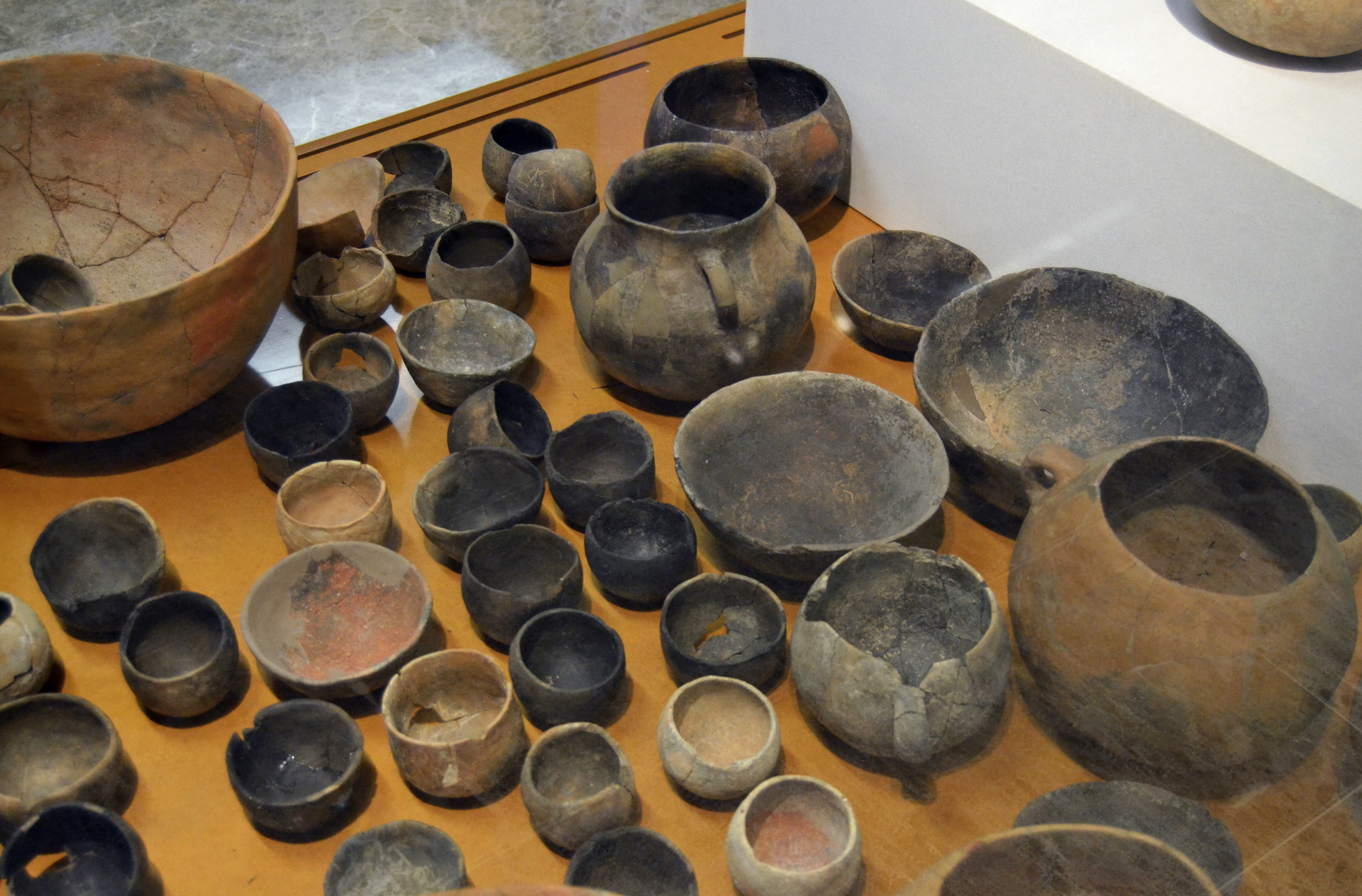
Ceramics

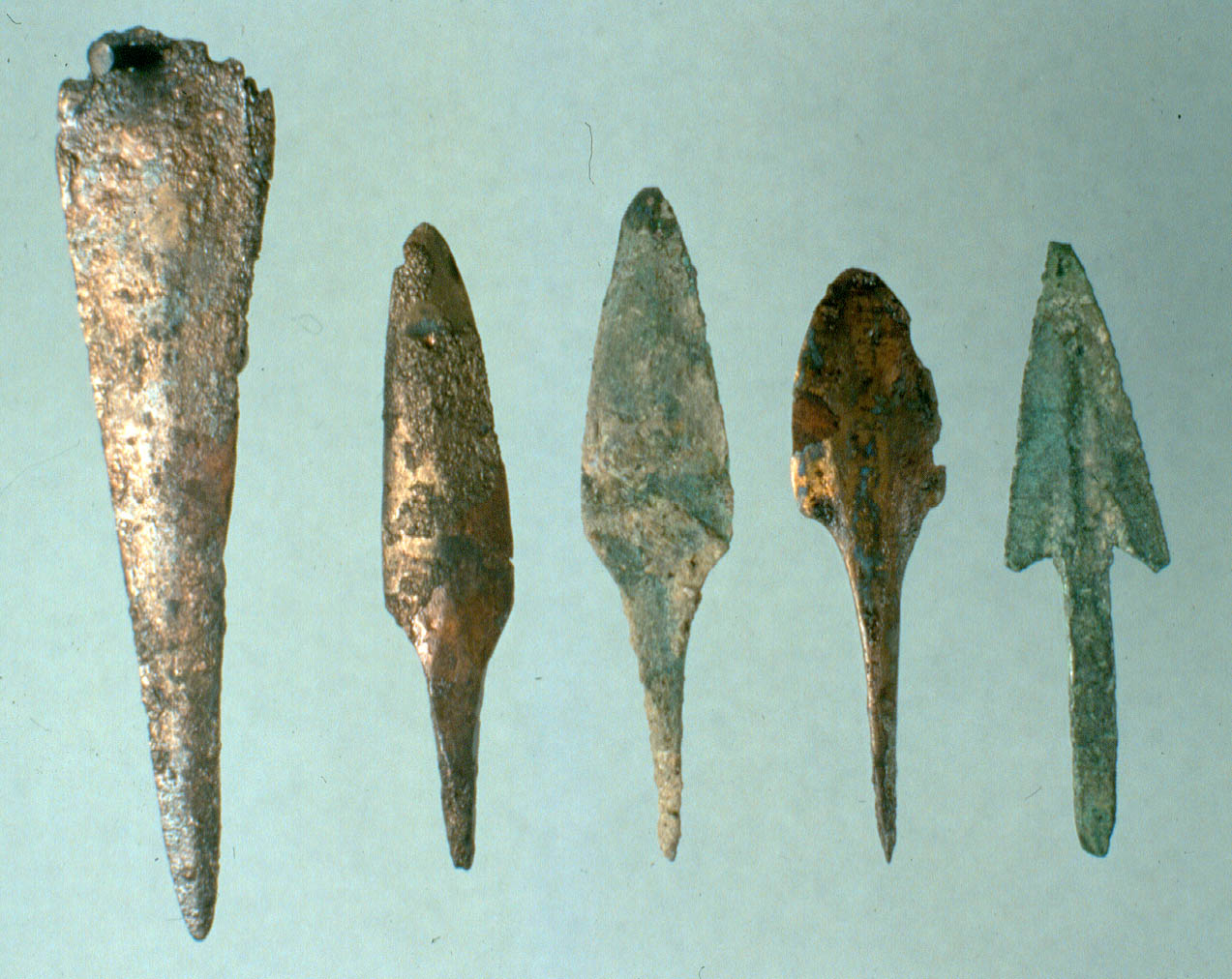
Weaponry

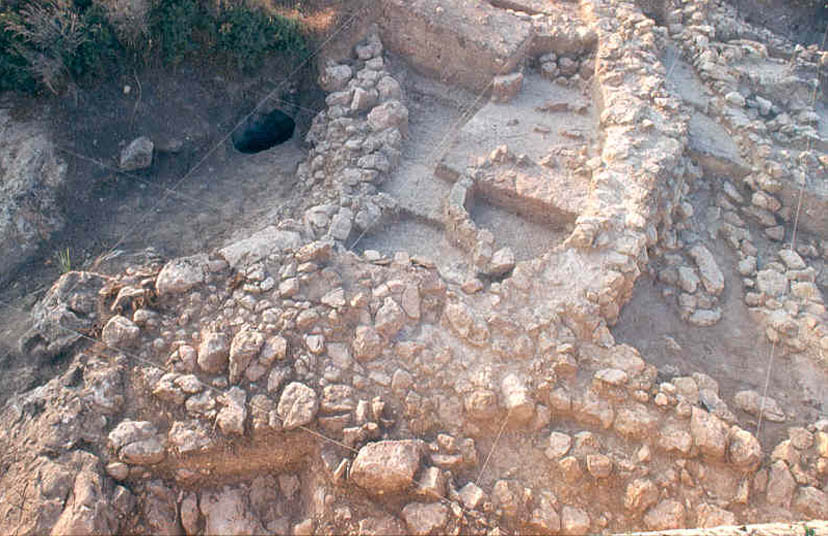
Muntanya Assolada site (Alzira)

== See also ==
- Atlantic Bronze Age
- Las Cogotas
- Motillas
- Argaric culture
- Pyrenean Bronze
- Lloma de Betxí
- Muntanya Assolada
- Les Raboses
