= Les Raboses =

Coordinates: 39.6902°N 0.3473°W

The archaeological site of Les Raboses is located on the mountain with the same name in the municipality of Albalat dels Tarongers (Baix Palancia). This deposit is framed chronologically in the Bronze Age.

== History ==
The site was found by the prospecting works carried out in the 1940s, by Andrés Monzo Nogues. The materials found in these surveys are being investigated and preserved by the Servicio de Investigación Prehistórica (SIP) de Valencia. The site was prospected and excavated again in 1987-89 by Eva Ripollés.

== Location and environment ==
The site of Les Raboses is inside the Camp de Morvedre region. Its location, on a hilltop is characteristic of the Bronze Age culture. Its environment is hilly and also frames the Palancia river basin, which has served as a communication hub between the interior and the coast since ancient times. It is delimited by the Garbí on the west and the mountains of Sant Esperit on the east. Their lithologies are formed by limestone materials and red sandstones, which are dominant. The top is elongated, and the site is very close to Barranco de Segart, which is a natural step between the Valle del Turia and Palancia.

Geomorphologically it belongs to structural domain of the Iberian System. The landscape is characterized by an abrupt relief, with heights below 600 meters, which corresponds to a mid-mountain environment. The Palancia river is the real structural axis of the region. Its rain regime is irregular, with large swings between summer and winter months.

== Climatology and vegetation ==
Orographic characteristics lead to different microclimates: thermomediterranean in the plains, mesomediterranean, with more rainfall, in shady areas and in the mountains. During the Sub-Boreal, humidity had been higher than it is today, so the species characteristics of a thermomediterranean / mesomediterranean floor (Quercus faginea, Pinus sylvestris, Quercus suber), growing at lower altitudes because of it.

== Chronology ==
The start of the use of the site of Les Raboses would be at some point during the Early and Middle Bronze Age, and it would not reach the Final Bronze.

== Interpretation ==
The extension excavated in Les Raboses is about 90 m^{2}. The potential of the site is large and it is estimated that its surface may be 2500 m^{2}. The available space was modified by building structures, based on four terracing walls, which would create the space used for the construction of rooms and entries or passageways. The upper platform of the site was occupied by a room structure, which used the face of the first terracing wall as an internal wall. The lower zone would consist of a solid trapezoidal structure, with a possible controlling or defensive function. The materials used in construction are local rodeno slabs, limestone blocks of the very top, land, clays and plant cover elements, which are reflected in the imprints.

In some nearby sites of the Bronze Age, as the Puntal de Cambra (Villar del Arzobispo), the Lloma de Betxí (Paterna), Muntanya Assolada (Alzira) or Mola de Agres, the presence of important buildings that required a huge collective effort is noticed, so it may be guessed that certain hierarchical elements that coordinate these efforts had existed.

== Bibliography ==
- Ripollés, E. (1994): Les Raboses (Albalat dels Tarongers): Un yacimiento de la Edad del Bronce en el Baix Palància. ("Les Raboses (Albalat dels Tarongers): A site of the Bronze Age in the Lower Palancia.") Archive Levantina Prehistory, XXI, 47-82.
- Ripollès, E. (2000): "Notas entorno a la tipología, cronología y origen de una punta de flecha de hueso localizada en el yacimiento de les Raboses (Albalat dels Tarongers, Valencia): las puntas con doble hilera de aletas de la edad del bronce", Quad. Preh. Arq. Cast., 21, 95-108

== See also ==
- Prehistory Museum of Valencia
