= Pyrenean Bronze =

Archeological culture in Western Europe

- Alternative names: North-East Bronze or Northeastern Bronze
- Geographical range: provinces of Lleida, Barcelona and Girona, departments of Pyrénees-Orientales and Aude
- Period: Early Bronze Age
- Dates: c. 2300–1650 BC
- Preceded by: Bell Beaker culture, Veraza culture
- Followed by: Urnfield culture

The Pyrenean Bronze (also known as Northeastern Bronze) is a regional European Bronze Age culture, known from archaeological facies, that spread through the Spanish provinces of Girona, Barcelona, Lleida and the eastern half of Huesca; also it spread through the French departments of the Pyrenees-Orientales and Aude.

From the Bell Beaker culture (2750-2300 BC), two regional styles appeared in Catalonia, one being the Pyrenean and the other the Salomó (from which the North-East Group was derived). These two styles coexisted at the same time in the provinces of Barcelona and the south of Lleida. From 1650 A.C. the Pyrenean ceramic style gave way to carinated cups, to pots with smooth or indented cords, as well as to vessels with button appendages on the handle.

Few settlements are known: Lo Lladre (Llo, Pyrenees-Orientales), Collet de Brics (Ardèvol, Lleida), Institut A. Pous (Manlleu, Barcelona), Roques del Sarró (Lleida), Cedre (Santa Coloma, Andorra).

Advanced bronze metallurgy was developed: flat axes, needles, rivet daggers, arrowheads, as well as a diadem and two spiral bracelets found in the Montanissell cave. Possibly many of the techniques used had a North Italian origin in the Polada culture (2200–1600 BC).

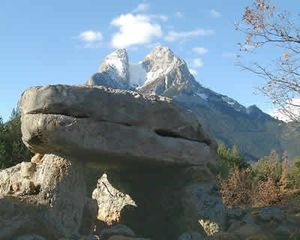
Dolmen of Molers, in Saldes

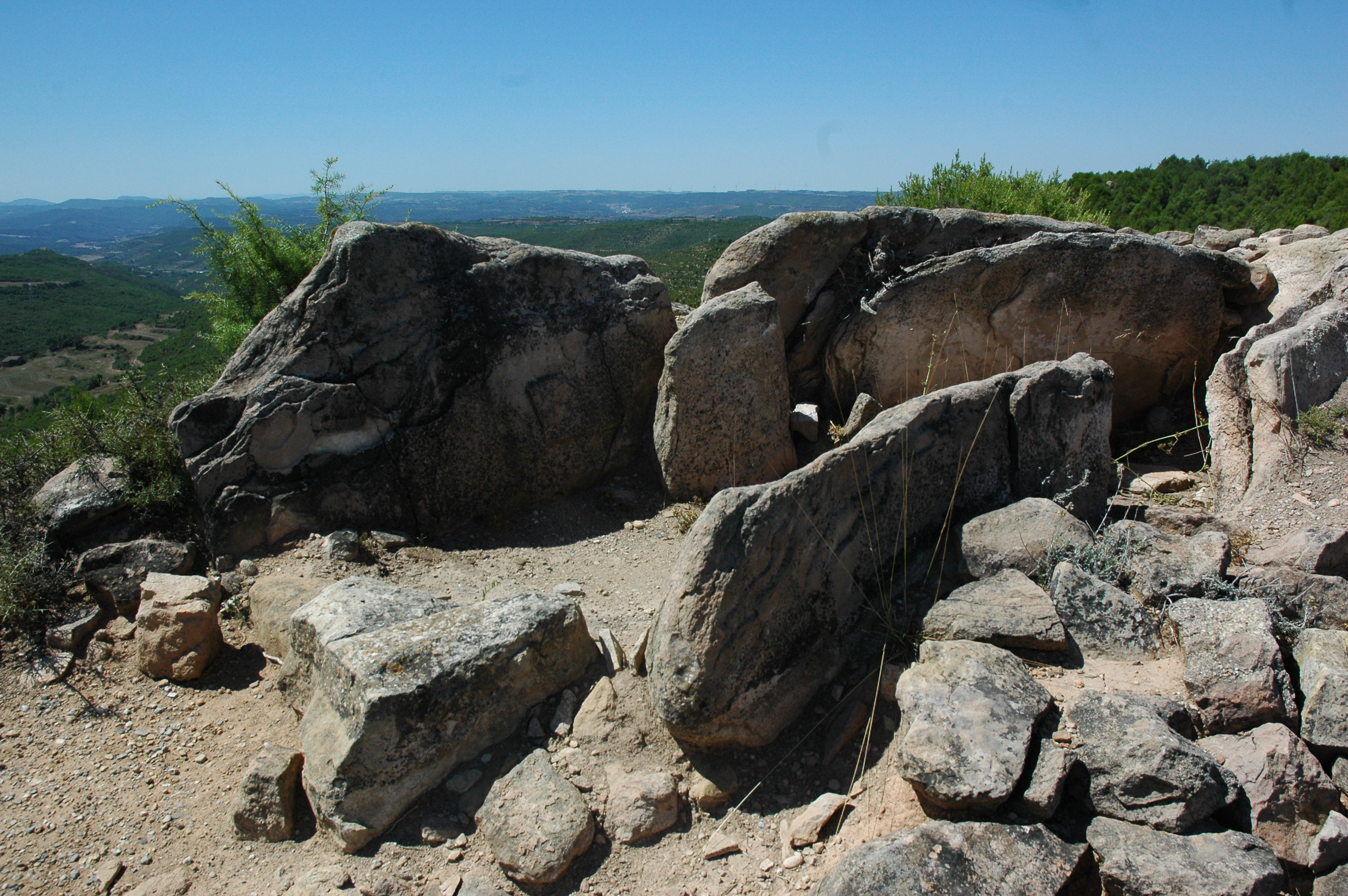
Dolmen of Maioles, in Rubió

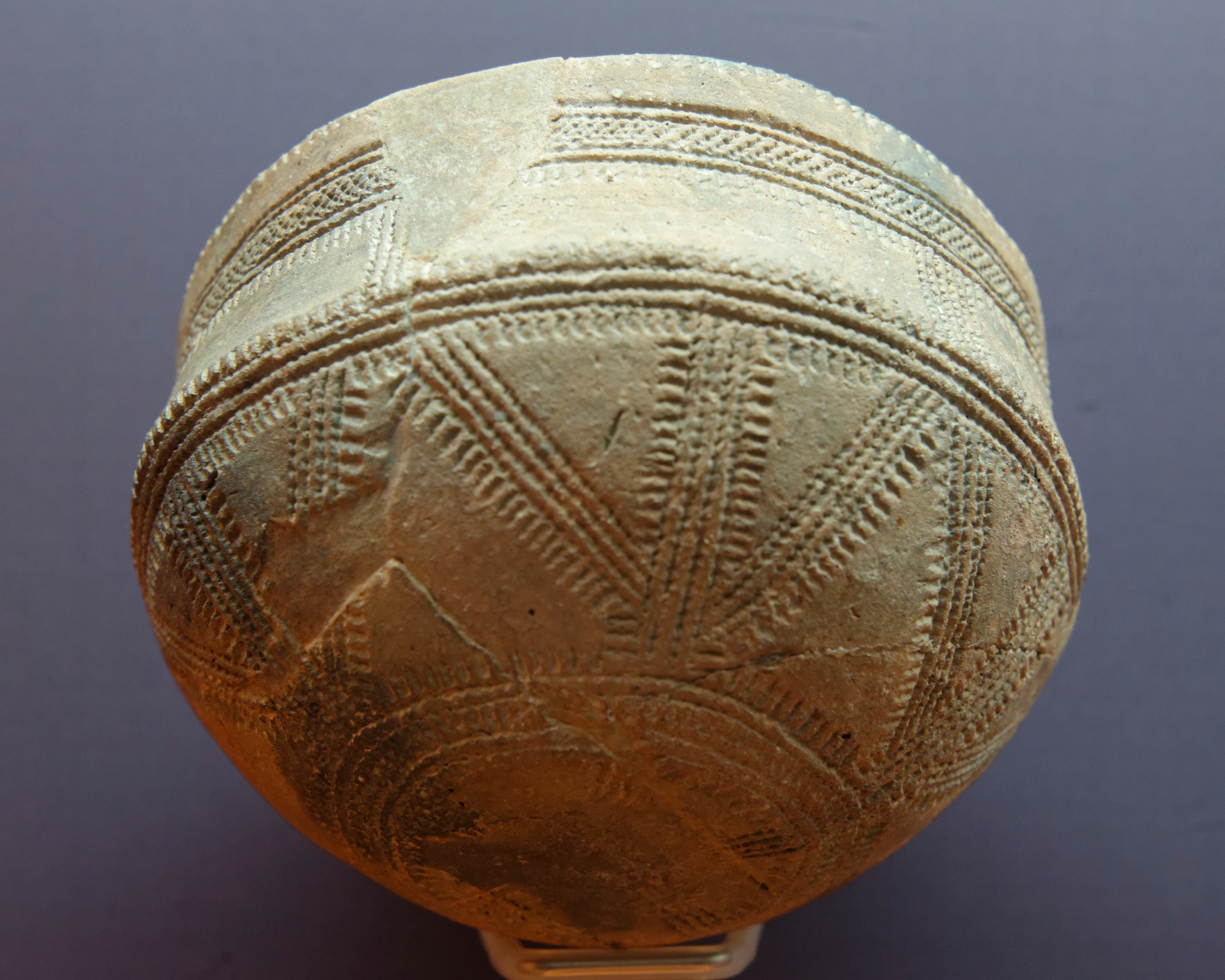
Carinated bowl with epicampaniforme decoration, from La Riba site (Sant Just Desvern, Barcelona)

Several funeral formats were used:

- pits such as Mas d’en Boixos (Pacs, Barcelona), Bosc del Quer (Sant Julià de Vilatorta, Barcelona), Can Bonastre (Martorell, Barcelona).
- reuse of silos, such as Camp Cinzano (1950-1650 BC).
- reuse of Chalcolithic hypogea: Carrer Paris (Cerdanyola del Vallès, Barcelona).
- hypogean pits (wells with a side chamber), for collective use: Mas d’en Boixos (Pacs, Barcelona), Bosc del Quer (Sant Julià de Vilatorta, Barcelona), Can Bonastre (Martorell, Barcelona).
- cists like Camp Cinzano (Vilafranca del Penedès, Barcelona), or Vall de Miarnau (Llardecans, Lleida).
- caves with collective burials: Bòfia de Sant Jaume (Montmajor, Barcelona), Cova M del Cingle Blanc (Arbolí, Tarragona), Cova de la Pesseta (Torrelles de Foix, Barcelona), Galls Carboners (Mont-ral, Tarragona), Cova del Gegant (Sitges, Barcelona), Montanissell cave (Call de Nargó, Lleida).
- paradolmens or cave-dolmens such Tossal Gros (Torroella de Montgrí) in Girona, Masia (Torrelles de Foix, Barcelona), Tafania (Ventalló, Girona), Balma dels Ossos (Sallent, Barcelona), Cova Verda (Sitges, Barcelona), etc.
- dolmens (Pyrenean chambers or simple chambers) with stone mounds: Creu de la Llosa, Serrat d'en Jacques, Santes Masses (Solsona, Lleida), Dolmen de Molers (Saldes, Barcelona), Castelltallat (Sant Mateu de Bages, Barcelona), Serra de Clarena (Castellfollit del Boix, Barcelona), Maioles (Rubió, Barcelona), etc.

With regard to the megalithic traditions of the Pyrenean Bronze Age, the menhir and cromlech of Mas Baleta (La Jonquera, Girona) also must be included.

== Genetic profile ==
Some individuals who lived in the Pyrenean Bronze area were genetically tested. From the collective funerary cave known as Grotte Basse de la Vigne Perdue, near Narbonne, an individual was assigned to Y-chromosome haplogroup R1b-Z195 (being its ancestor Haplogroup R-DF27). Also from another collective funerary cave, the Cova del Gegant (Sitges, Barcelona), a male from the middle of the second millennium was assigned to Y-chromosome R1b-P310. Another individual from the Can Roqueta II necropolis in Sabadell (Barcelona), was from the subclade R1b-P312. A male buried in the collective inhumation hypogeum found in Miquel Vives street (Terrassa, Barcelona), also was assigned to R1b-P310.

== See also ==
- Polada culture
- Rhône culture
- Levantine bronze
