= Font de Mussa Mosaic =

Historical piece

Mosaic de la Font de Mussa
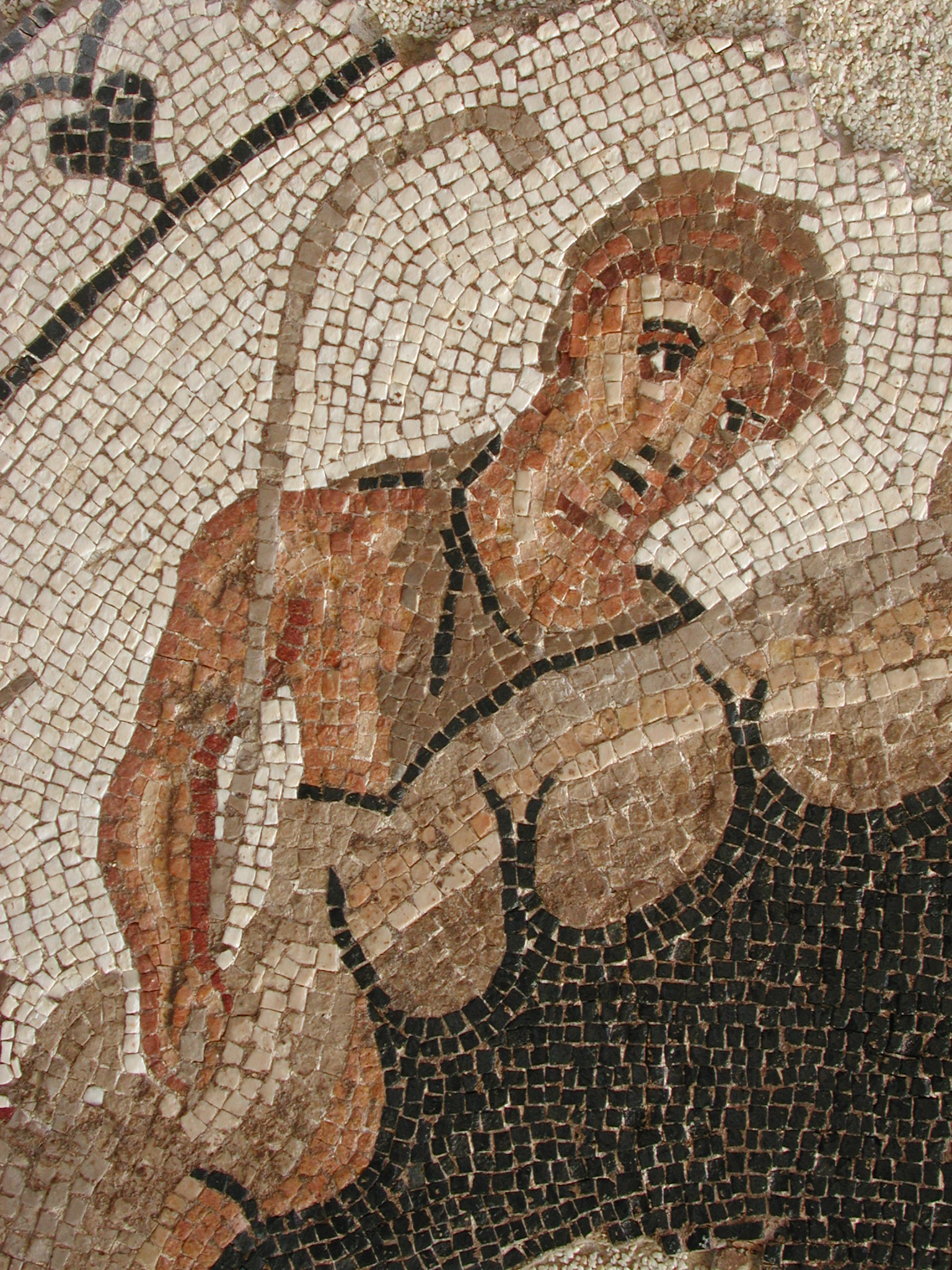
- Detail of the Mosaic, with Faustulus represented.
- Artist: Unknown
- Year: approx. 1st-2nd century Discovered in 2001 in Font de Mussa (Benifaió)
- Type: Mosaic
- Medium: Marble
- Dimensions: 550 cm × 425 cm (220 in × 167 in)
- Location: Prehistory Museum of Valencia, Valencia

The Mosaic de Font de Mussa (Mosaic from the Source of Mussa, in English) is a Roman mosaic found in Benifaió (Ribera Alta, Land of Valencia) that dates to the 1st or 2nd century. It is located in the Museum of Prehistory of Valencia, where it is one of the most highlighted pieces.

== Description ==
It is a mosaic of opus tessellatum decorated with tesselles of marble of 6 millimeters.

It presents a central decoration polychromated showing figures that represent the shepherd Faustulus and his brother in front of a cave where there is a wolf that would suckle Romulus and Remus.

The remaining decoration of the mosaic is bichromatic, in white and black. It consists of borders with plant motifs, including lobed and serrated grapevine leaves, grape pendants, and various alternating flowers with four and six petals. There are two corolla designs resembling a crater, stems with enveloping leaves, and other motifs. Additionally, there are geometric patterns that form crosses, flowers, and stars.

A portion of the mosaic is missing, a longitudinal strip located in the central area. This loss is the result of municipal construction work carried out in the past decade. In the northwest corner, there was a white marble staircase resembling a ramp with perpendicular moldings serving as steps. This staircase provided access to a lower space where this mosaic floor was located.
