= Rhône culture =

Bronze Age culture in France and Switzerland

- Geographical range: Eastern France, western Switzerland
- Period: Early Bronze Age
- Dates: c. 2200 BC-1500 BC
- Preceded by: Bell Beaker culture
- Followed by: Tumulus culture

The Rhône culture was an archaeological culture of the Early Bronze Age (c. 2200-1500 BC) located in eastern France and western Switzerland, centred along the Rhône river. The culture developed from the local Bell Beaker culture, possibly with further migrations from central Europe.

The metallurgy and ceramics of the Rhône culture are particularly similar to those of the Straubing group in Bavaria, suggesting contacts or shared cultural influences between the two regions. The economy features innovations such as the introduction of new cereal crops and a pasture-based economy, with intensified cattle farming.

== Ethnic identity ==
For Bernard Sergent, the origin of the Ligurian linguistic family (which he considers distantly related to the Italic and Celtic families) can be traced back to the Rhône and Polada cultures, both strongly linked to Central European Unetice traditions.

== Artefacts and characteristics ==
=== The Thun-Renzenbühl axe ===
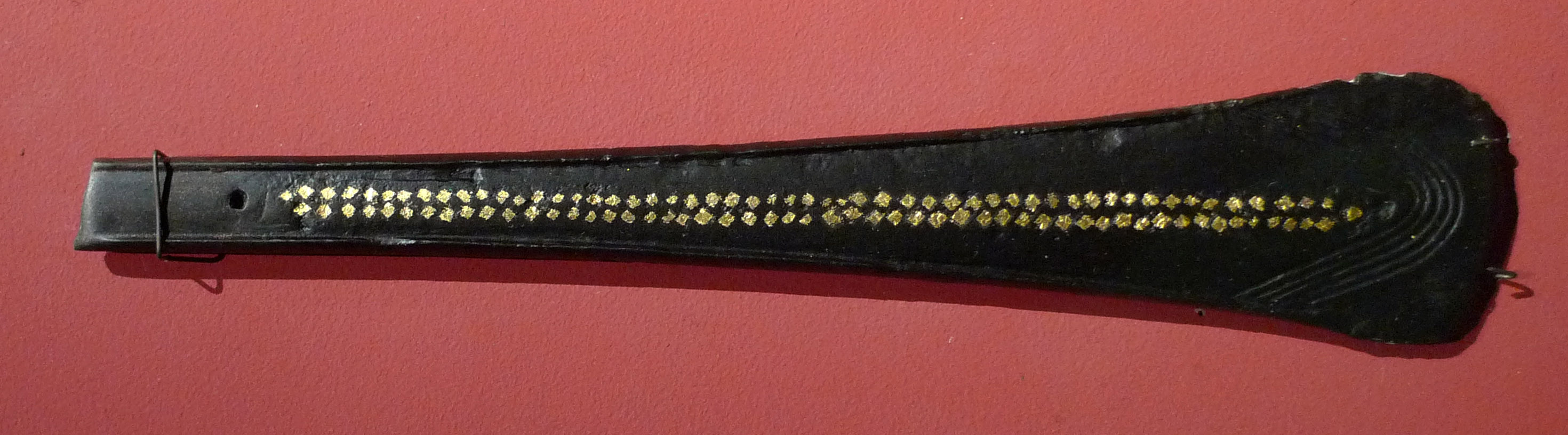
The Thun-Renzenbühl axe

The Thun-Renzenbühl axe (c. 1800 BC), found near Thun and attributed to the Rhône culture, is one of the earliest examples of the use of damascening technique in the world. The gold inlay decoration on the axe may also have a numerical, astronomical meaning.

Its complex decoration and relatively poor casting quality indicate that it served primarily as an object of prestige or status.

== Gallery ==
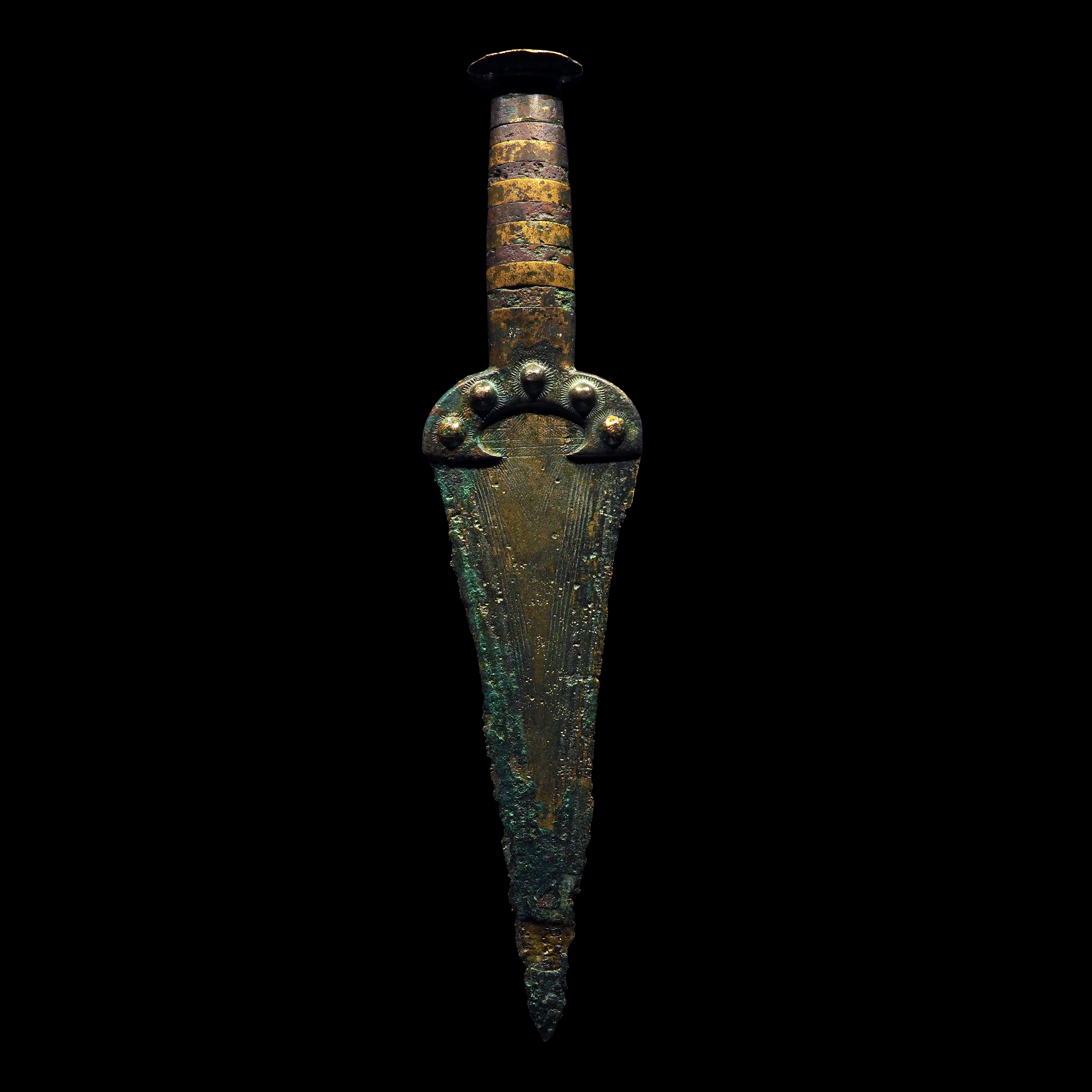

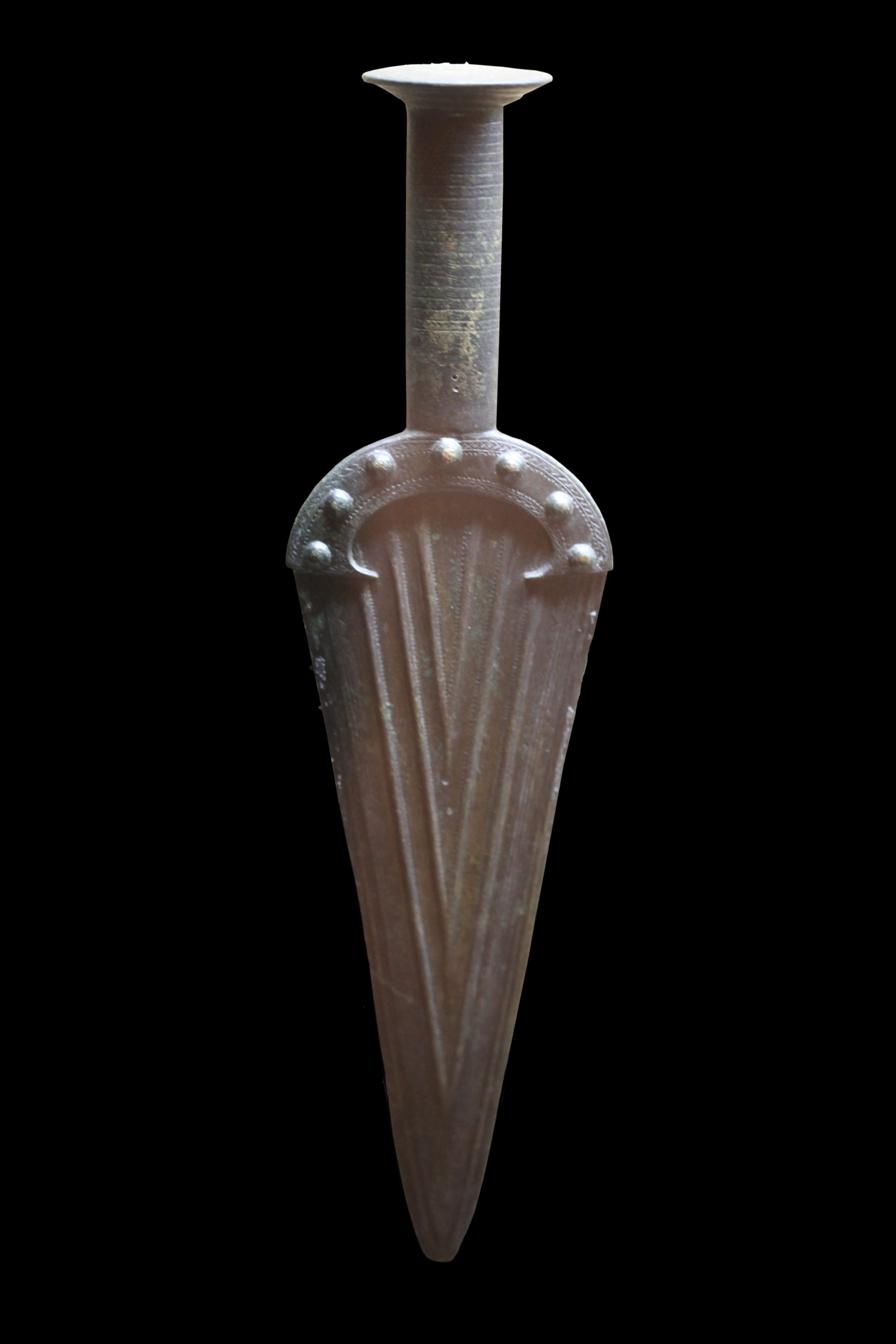

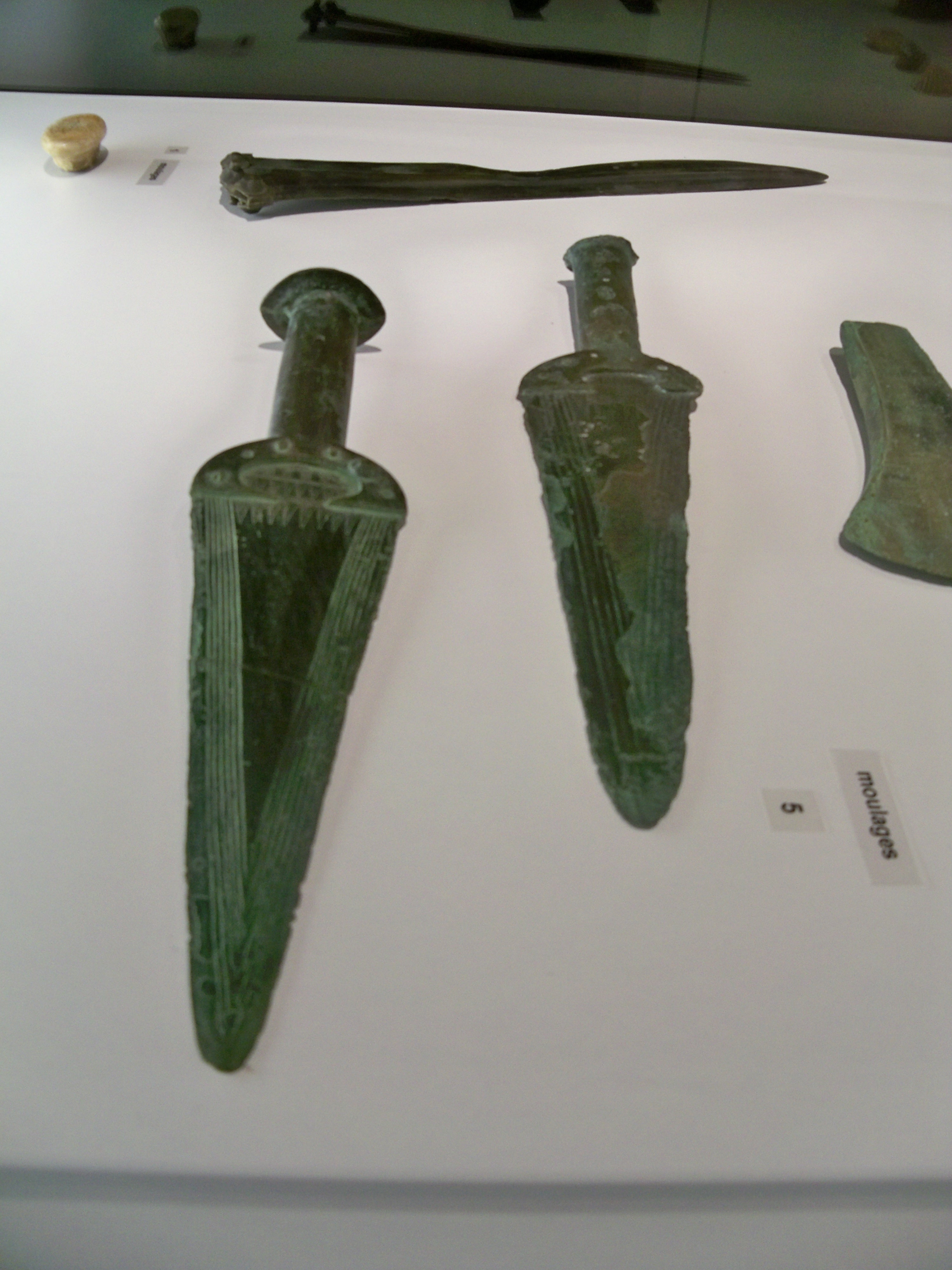

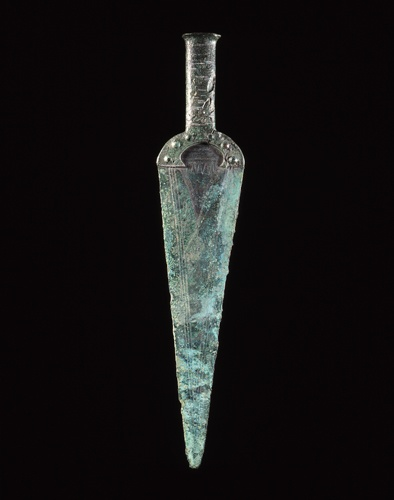

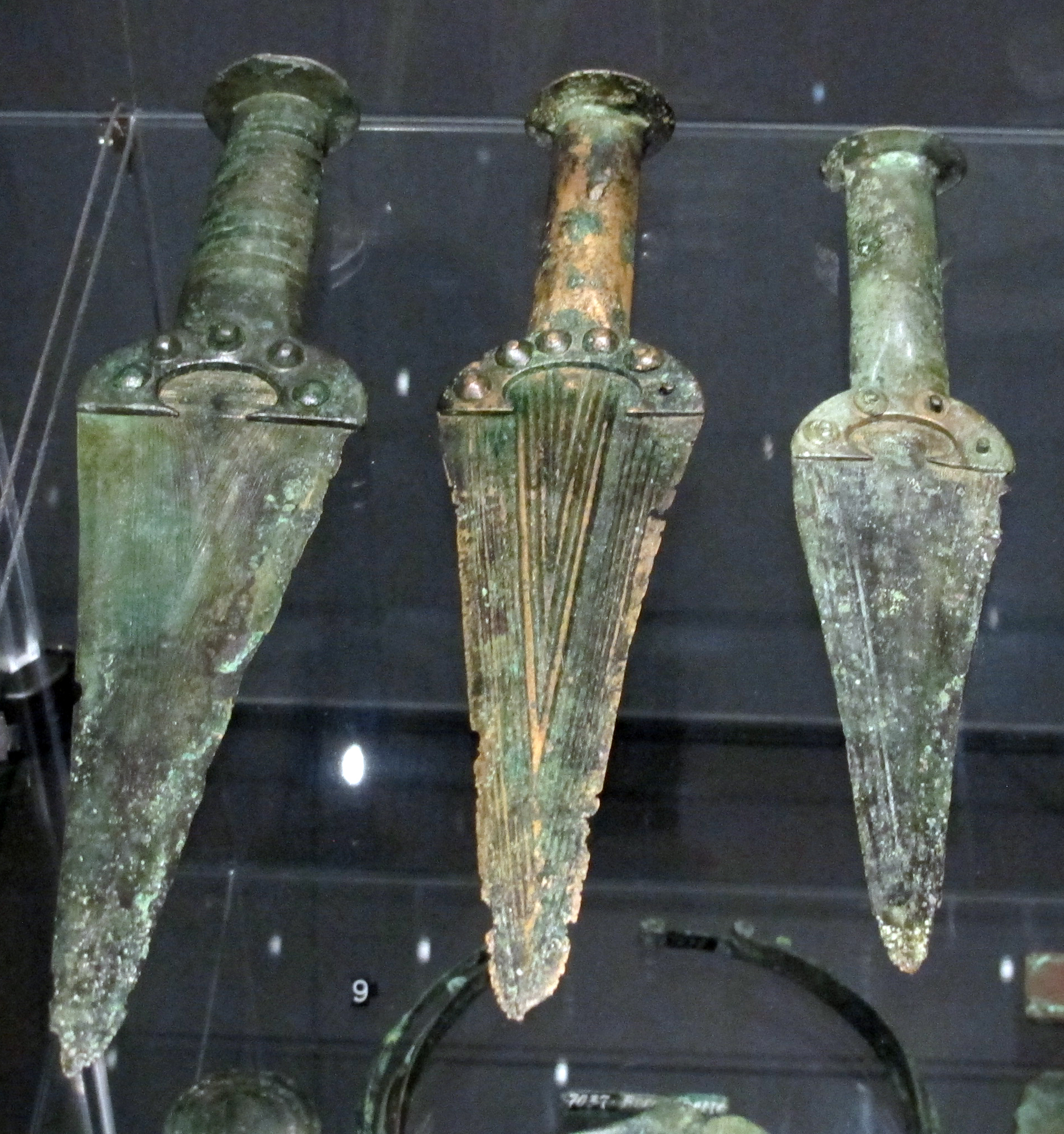

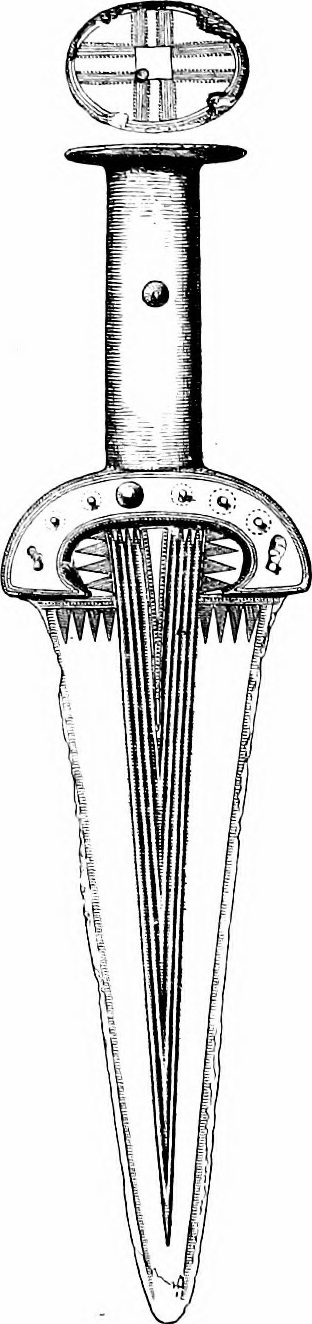

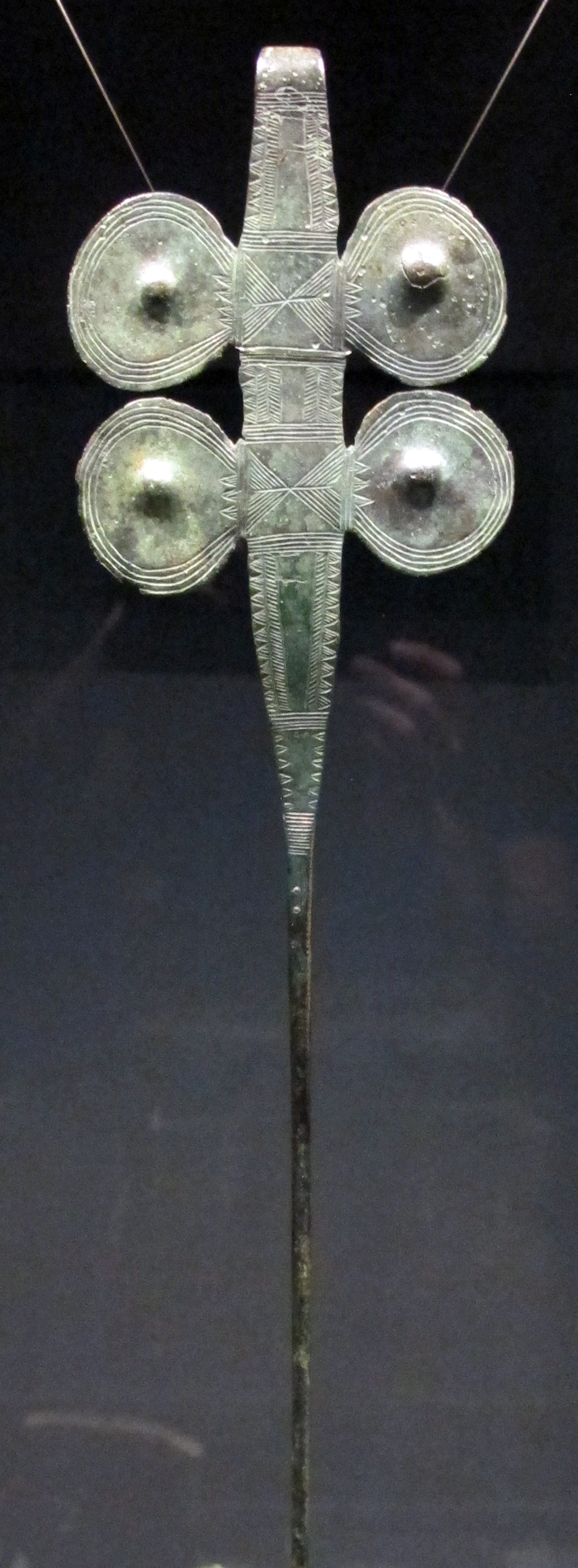

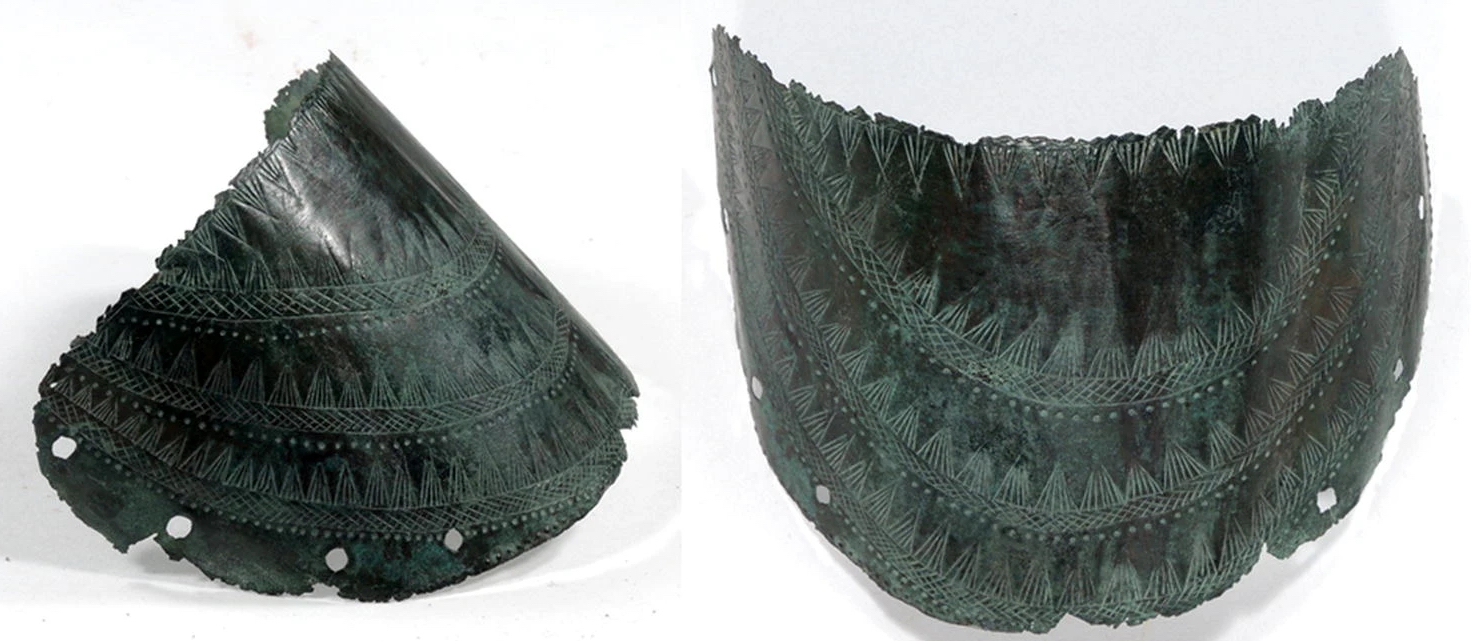

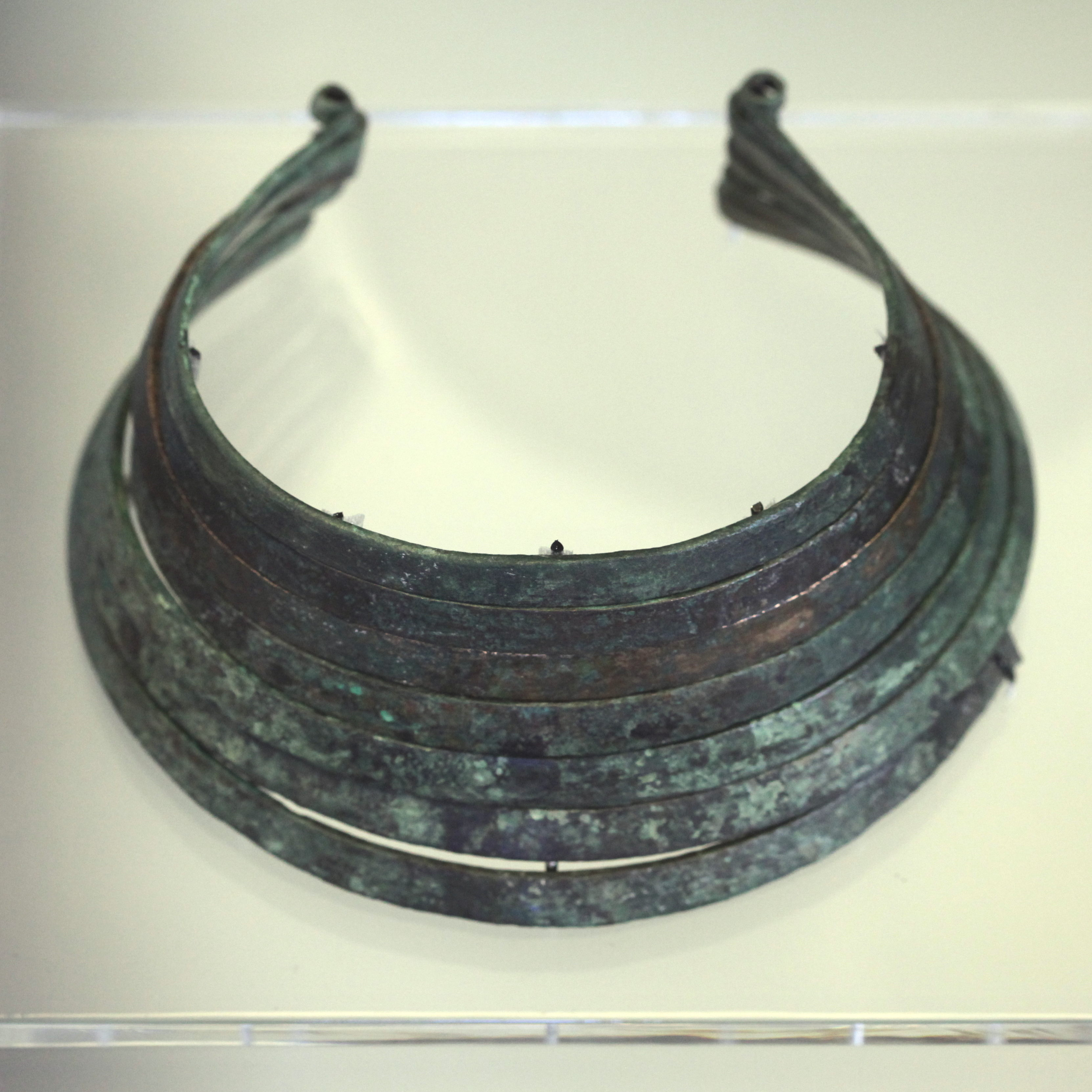

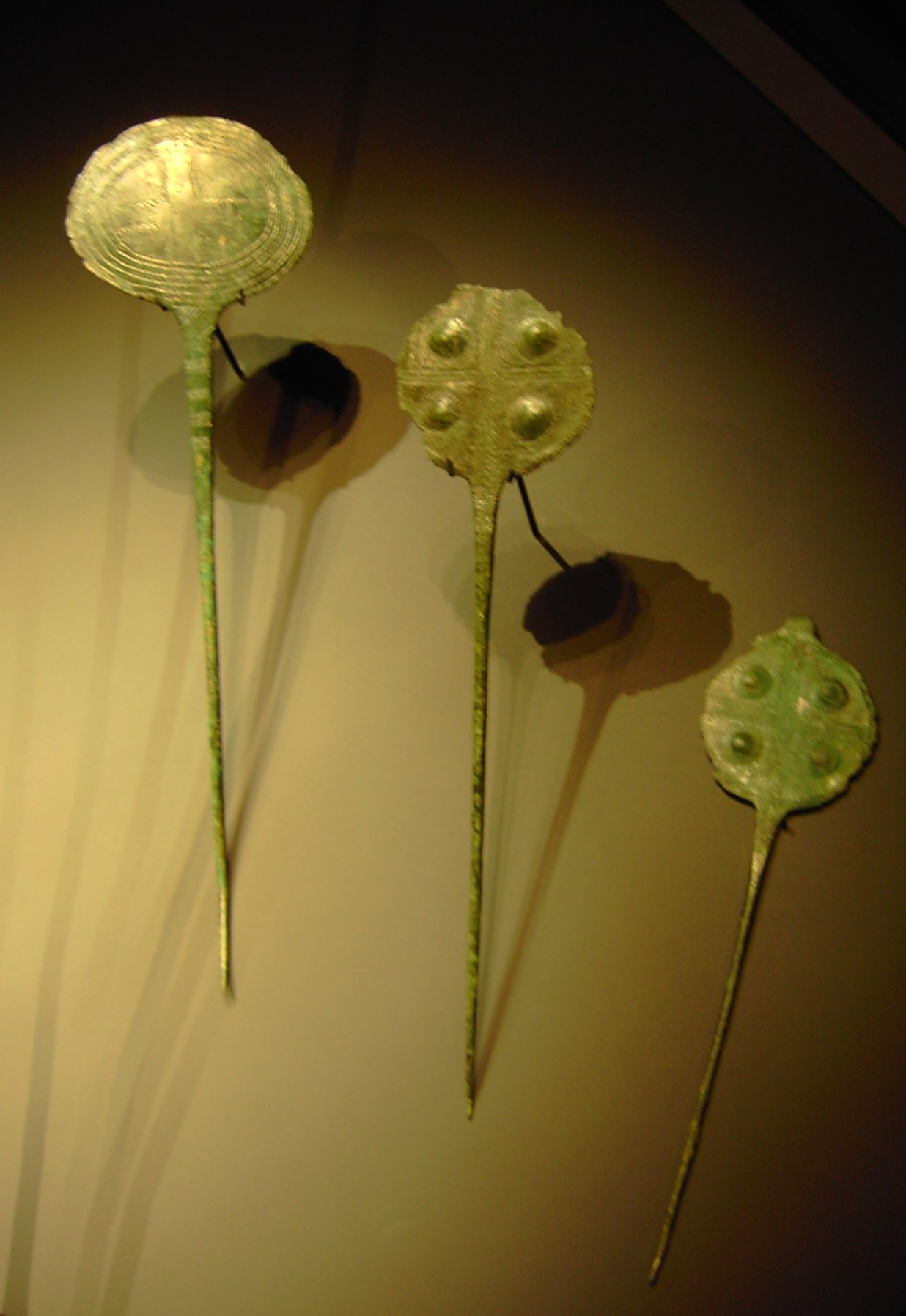
Dress pins with sun cross symbol, BC

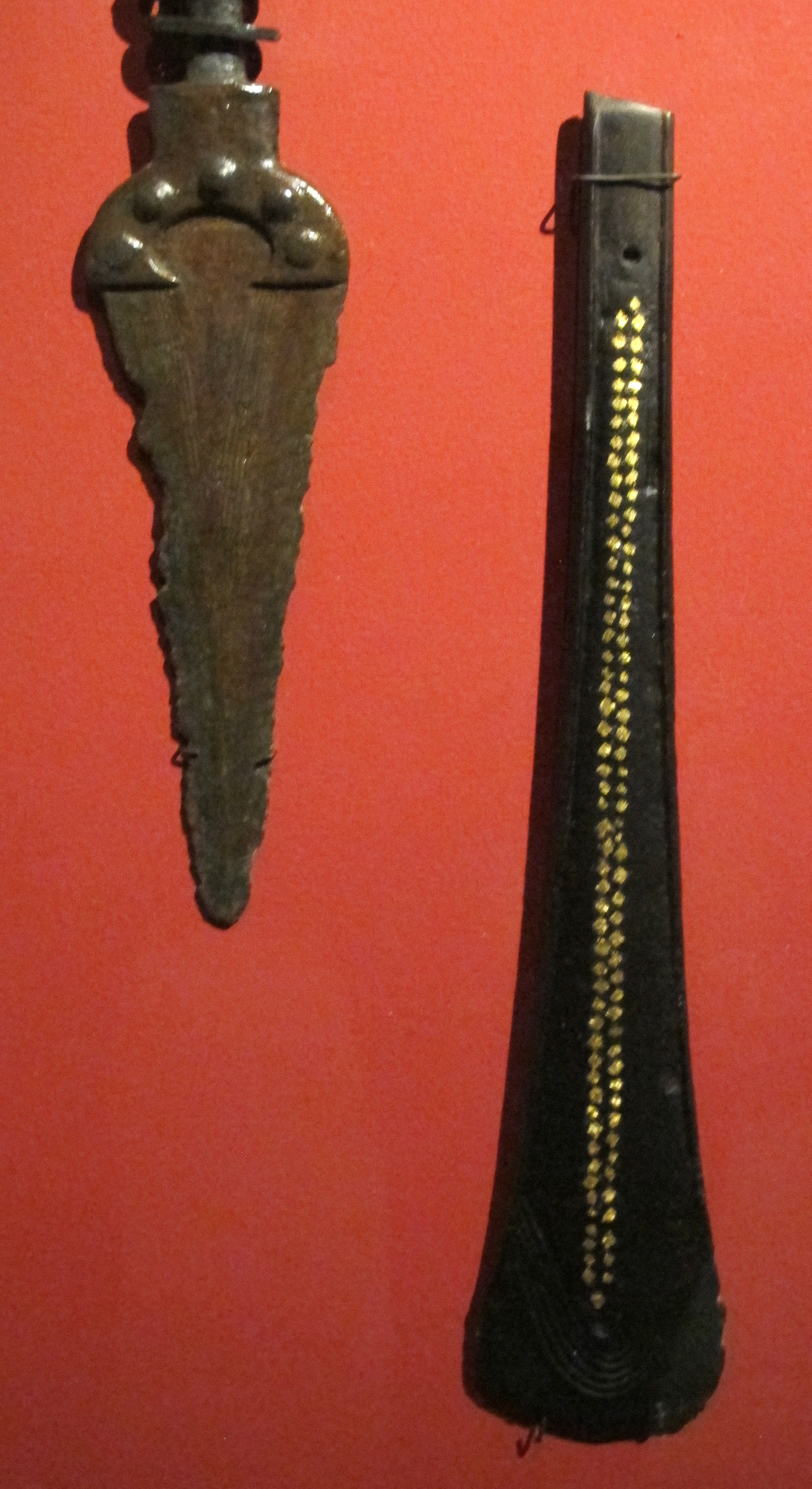

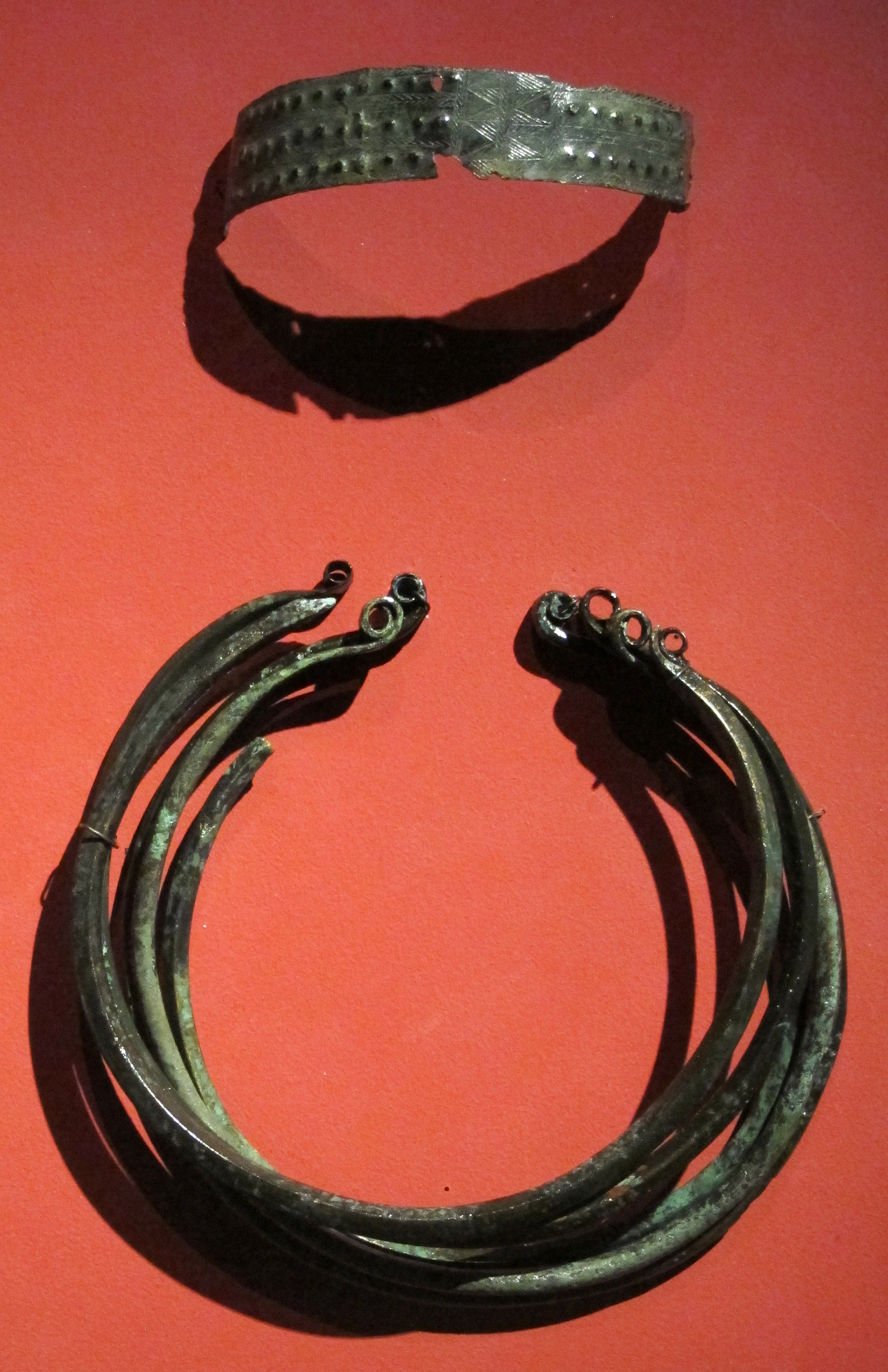

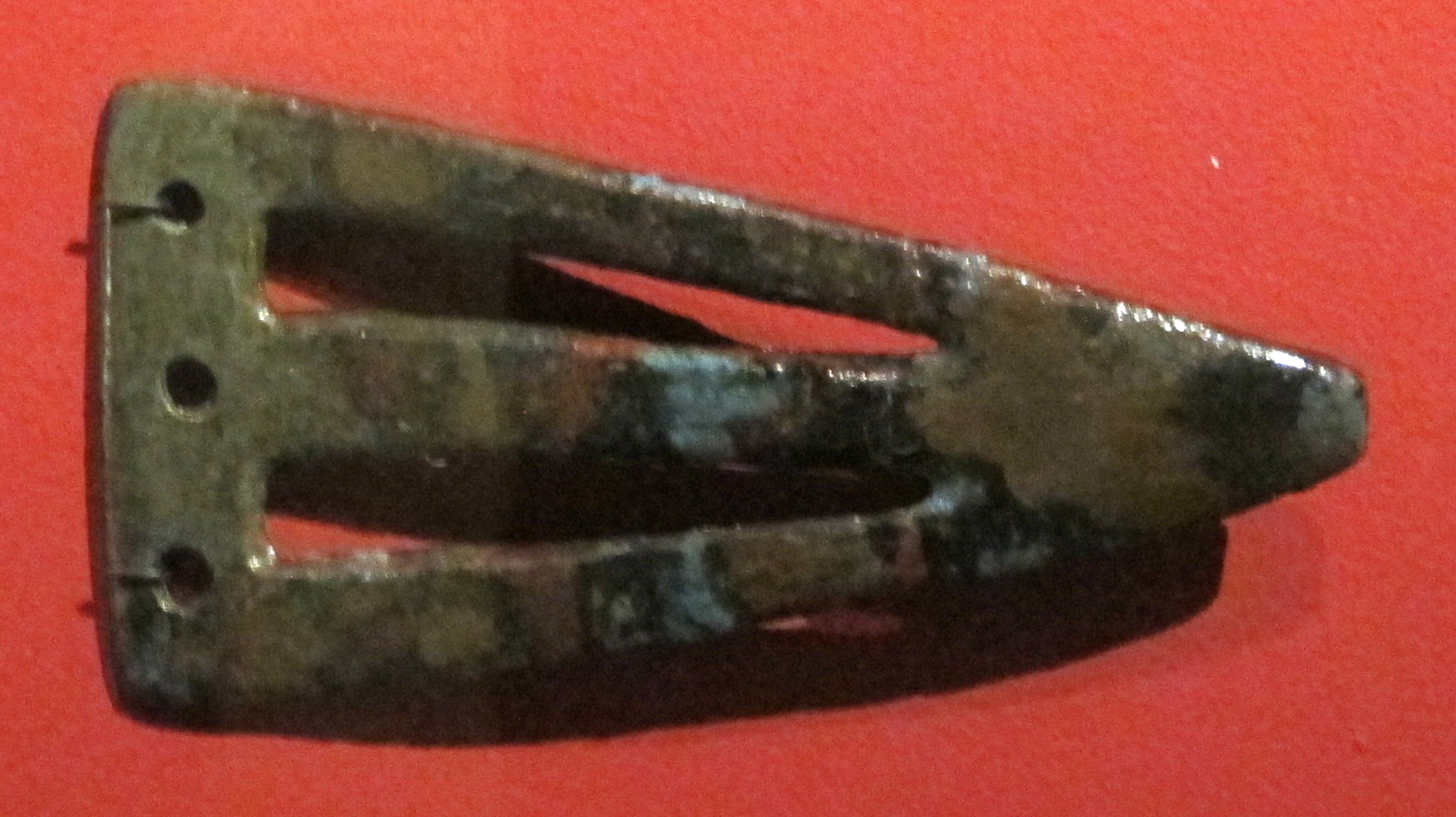

== See also ==
- Únětice culture
- Bronze Age Britain
- Armorican Tumulus culture
- Polada culture
- Pyrenean Bronze
- Ottomány culture
- Wietenberg culture
- Tumulus culture
- Nordic Bronze Age
