= Muntanya Assolada =

Bronze Age settlement in Alzira, Valencia, Spain

Muntanya Assolada is a Bronze Age settlement located on the right bank of the Xúquer river, in Spain, built on the top of a spur of the Corbera mountain range, dominating the river plain from a height of 227 metres (745 ft) above sea level. It is located in the municipality of Alzira, Valencia, Spain.

Excavation campaigns began in 1978, under the direction of Bernat Martí Oliver, and continued until 1996, and work on the site was resumed in 2004. From the 1990s Rosa Enguix Alemany and María Jesús de Pedro joined the direction of the site. At present the excavated area covers 700 square metres (7,500 sq ft) and includes different structures, like a central street and rectangular departments on both sides; a wall of two meters wide that preserves almost three meters of height (6.6 × 9.8 ft); occupancy soils and abandonment episodes; livestock stabling; and terracing of the slopes to expand its surface.

At present the site is property of the Alzira City council, and the new beginning of the excavations by the Servei d'Investigació Prehistòrica has as objective the consolidation of the exhumed structures and its signposting for visitor access.

A nearby burial cave indicates the continuity in the use of natural caves as necropolis, and an individual burial has been found in a pit in the interior of the area too. On the other hand, the recovered remains show a wide chronological sequence between the Early Bronze and the Late Bronze.

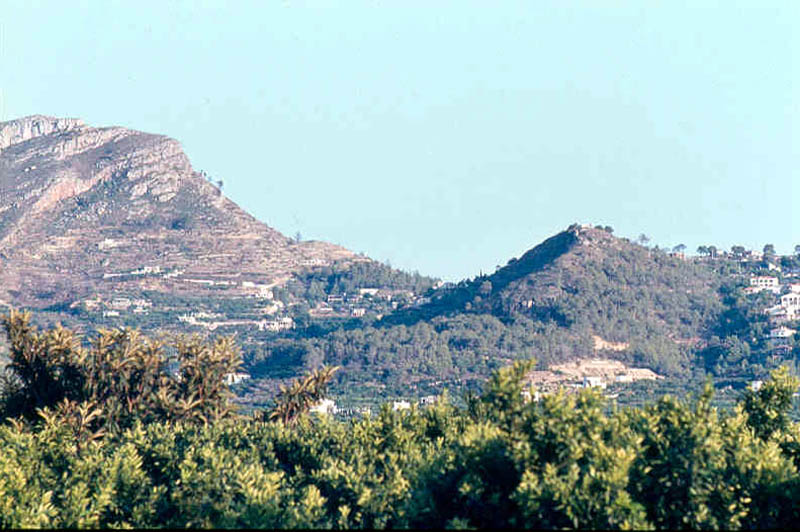
Location of the Muntanya Assolada

== Location ==
On the right bank of the Xúquer river is located the Muntanya Assolada Bronze Age village of Alzira. The settlement was built on the top of a spur of the Corbera mountain range, west of Tallat Roig, between the Murta and the Aixavegó ravine, dominating the plain of the river from a height of 227 metres above sea level. The toponym "Muntanya Desolada" refers to the partial collapse of the summit that occurred in autumn of 1783, the night of 24–25 October. Until then the place was known as Muntanya de la Font del Baladre.

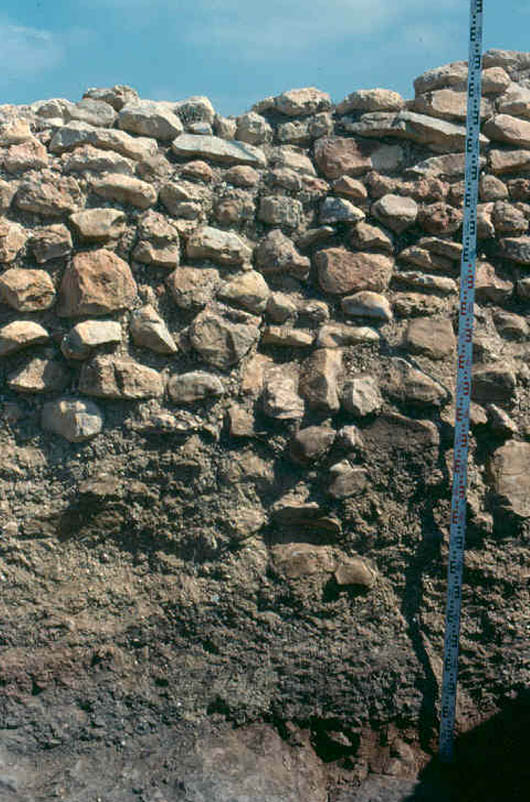
Wall area

== Archaeological interventions ==
The excavations carried out by the Servei d'Investigació Prehistòrica began in 1978 and continued until 1996, resuming again from 2004. The area currently excavated covers more than 700 m^{2} (7,500 sq ft) and corresponds to different room structures with anthropic deposits and evidences of the different activities developed there, such as occupation soils and abandonment episodes in which fire was detected, perhaps due to the combustion of materials accumulated by livestock stabling, and terracing of the slopes to gradually expand the surface of the village. In its upper part, can be seen a central street and departments on both sides. In one of them it has been documented a domestic oven for cooking bread or toasting cereals. And in the other, the entrance has stone steps.

The site is surrounded by a wall that is almost two meters wide and stands three meters high (6.6 × 9.8 ft). It was built on a summit that has been terraced by solid stone and clay buildings arranged in slope, thus prolonging the settlement on the slope. The existence of different levels of occupation, documented by stratigraphy and remains, is corroborated by the remodeling of the structures, some of them quickly and intentionally filled to give way to new construction lines. However, it seems to indicate that it was inhabited continuously throughout the Bronze Age.

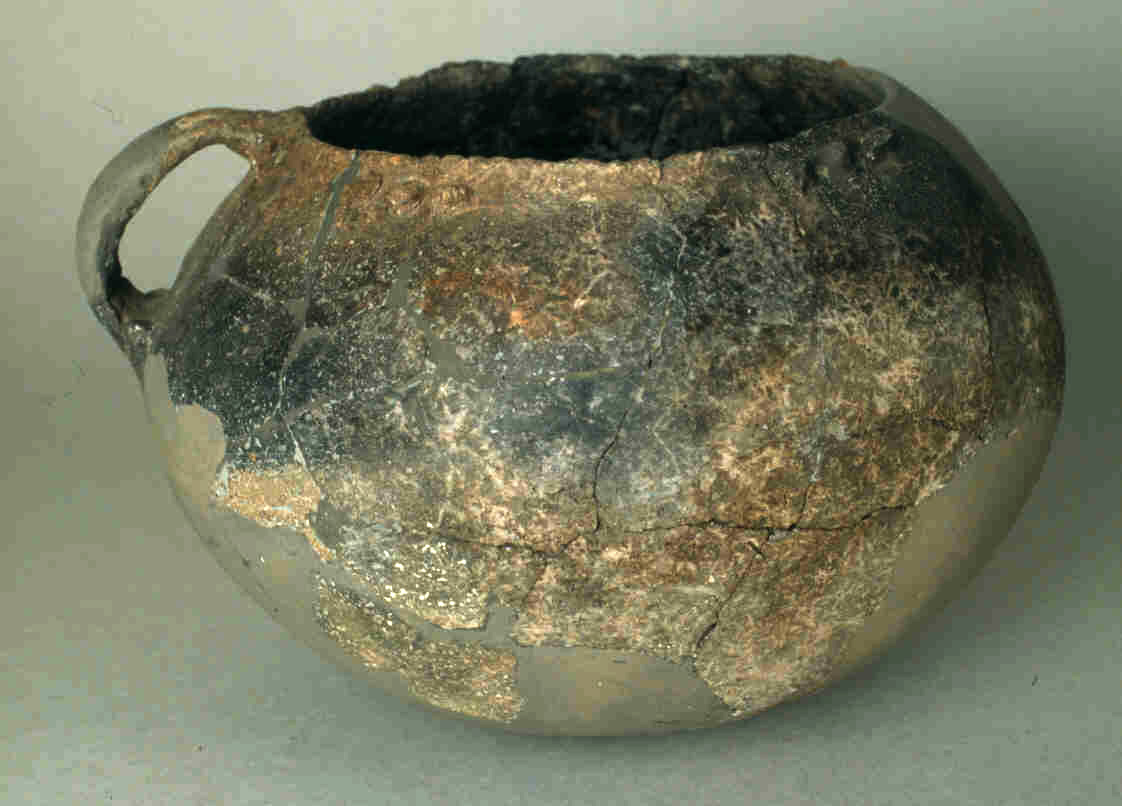
Ceramic pottery

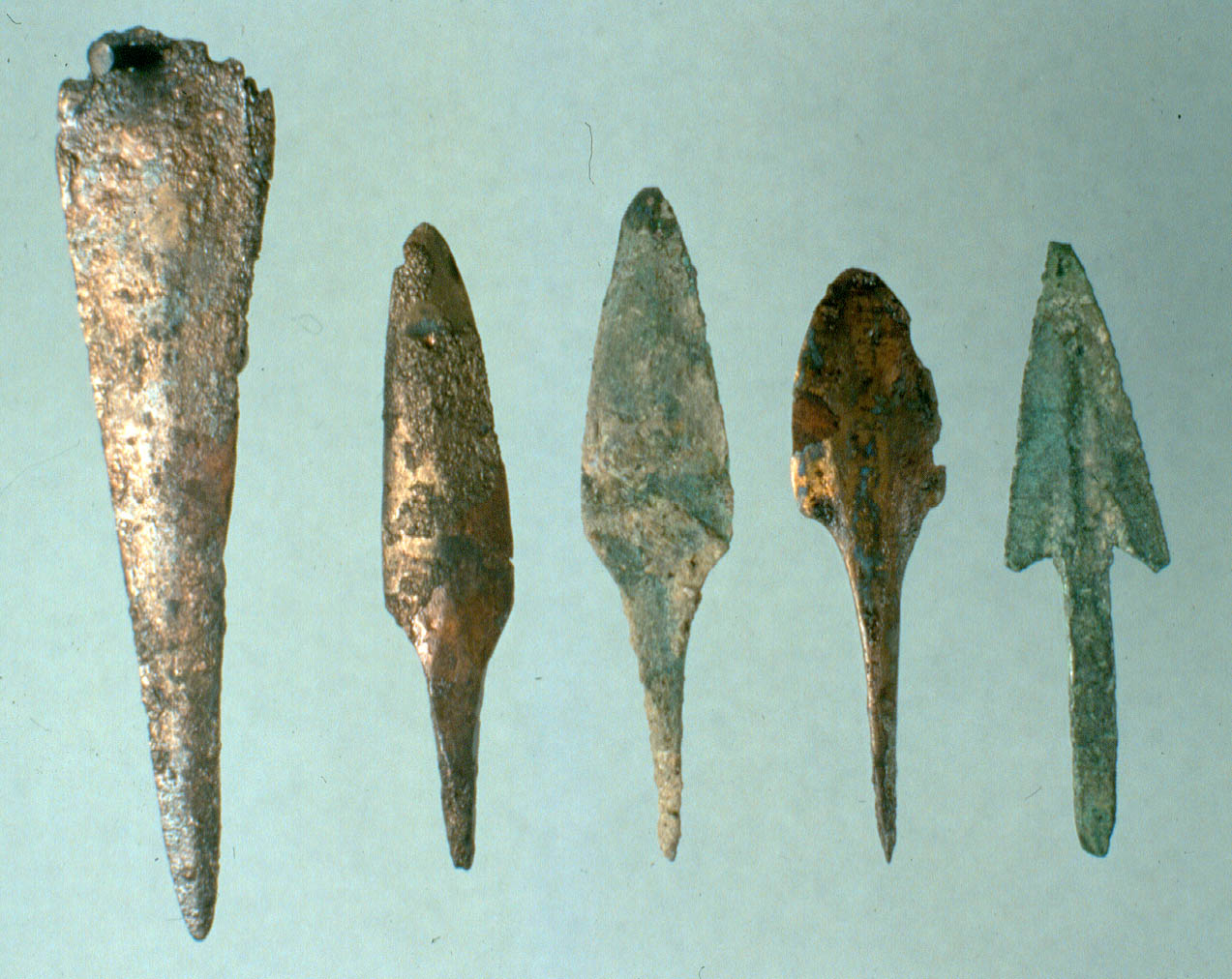
Metallic tips

== Archaeological remains ==
The remains are deposited in the Museu de Prehistòria de València. The pottery shows a variety of shapes, such as cups and bowls, pots and storage urns, fairing and geminated vessels, or spoons; and decorative motifs such as incisions, dots, typed strings, or burnished decoration. Among the metallic objects are gravers, arrowheads, a dagger of rivets, and a chisel, as well as other elements linked to the metallurgical activity, such as slags, a stone hammer and a ceramic crucible. The lithic industry has a good representation of sickle and flint arrowheads, polished stone tool and numerous remains of the lithic reductions. The bone industry is represented by gravers, spatulas and chisels, and by a ring and different ivory buttons. The fauna remains show the results of an agricultural village with sheep and goats predominating, the ox being used as an animal of draft and strength, and as a producer of meat and milk. Also the pig was raised, and there are remains of horse and dog. The hunt of the deer, beyond the necessary protection of the crops against herbivores, indicates the existence of a remarkable vegetation cover. The dating of a set of fauna from the lower layer of a space existing between the upper wall and a thickened structure, that is attached to it, has provided a date of 3470 ± 70 BP, between 1890 BC and 1690 BC.

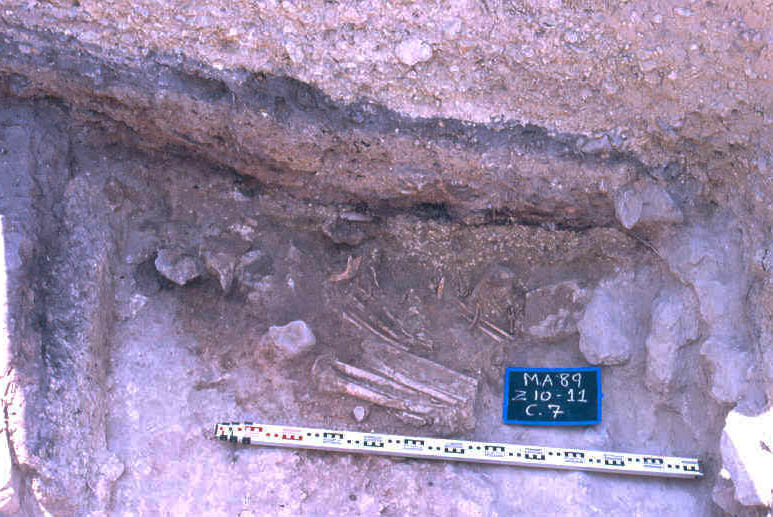
Human burial

== Human burials ==
The presence of human burials in the site is attested by the excavation of a small sepulchral cave immediately near the village, in the escarpment of its south-east side, which provided remains of a minimum of four individuals, animal bones and part of the grave goods that are with the buried. On the other side, in its westernmost southern slope, in the space delimited by a wide wall and by different stone courses that follow along the outer slope, a circular grave was excavated that contained another human burial, under a sedimentation of more than two meters (6.6 feet) of depth. The buried was in fetal position, right lateral decubitus, with the legs folded and the feet crossed. The right arm was elongated behind the back and the hand crushed by a block. The left arm was flexed in front of the body and the hand stretched below the face, missing most of the skull and upper maxilla. The absolute dating of this individual by C-14 has provided a date of 3760 ± 40 BP, between 2210 BC and 2130 BC.

== Relevance in its context ==
The Muntanya Assolada has been considered as a typical village of the Valencian Bronze Age, according to some decorative motifs of the pottery, globular and tall carena, the archaism of the lithic industry, the copper metallurgy, or the sepulchral cave found next to the village. The end of its habitation is related to the Late Bronze, attending to the fairing vessels with flared profile and with a pronounced angle of inflection, the flat bases or the presence of authentic bronze in the metallic objects. In fact, the typology of the vessels of Muntanya Assolada corresponds to what is usual in the villages of the Valencian Bronze Age. However, in their highest levels, such shapes as the mentioned fairing vessels are accompanied by the geminados, bowls and outgoing edge pots, considered more-evolved. The two absolute dates are shown in accordance with a sequence from the Early to the Late Bronze Age. La Muntanya Assolada and other nearby sites represent the continuity of a settlement that spans from the Bronze Age to the Iberian Culture, in a permanently occupied territory such as the Ribera del Xúquer.

The site was abandoned in the final period of the Middle Bronze Age or Late Bronze, to give way to a settlement located on the plain, first on Cases de Montcada, during the Late Bronze Age on Escoles Pies and during the Iron Age on the L'Alteret de la Vintihuitena of Albalat, to occupy later the slope of the highest hills with the arrival of the Iberian Culture.

== Bibliography ==
- De Miguel, M.P.; Ballesteros, J.M.; de Pedro, M.J.; Martí Oliver, B. (2007). "Malformación congénita cervical en una mujer de la Edad del Bronce procedente de la Muntanya Assolada (Alzira, Valencia)". IX Congreso Nacional de Paleopatología, Morella (póster).
- Enguix, R. y Martí, B. (1988). "La Cultura del Bronce Valenciano y la Muntanya Assolada de Alzira: Aproximación al estado actual de su investigación". Archivo de Prehistoria Levantina, XVIII, Valencia, pp. 241–250.
- Martí Oliver, B. (1983). "La Muntanya Assolada (Alzira, Valencia)". Lucentum II, Alicante, pp. 43–67.
- Martí Oliver, B. (1983). "La Muntanya Assolada (Alzira, Valencia). poblado de la cultura del Bronce Valenciano". XVI Congreso Nacional de Arqueología (Murcia 1982), Zaragoza, pp. 259–268.
- Martí Oliver, B. y de Pedro, M.J. (1995): Los poblados de la Cultura del Bronce Valenciano: Modelo tradicional y nuevas excavaciones. Homenaje a la Dra. Dª Milagro Gil-Mascarell Boscà, Extremadura Arqueológica, V, Cáceres-Mérida, pp. 101–114.
- Martí Oliver, B. y de Pedro, M.J. (1997). "Sobre el final de la Cultura del Bronce Valenciano: Problemas y progresos". Saguntum-PLAV, 30, Valencia, pp. 59–91.
- Martí Oliver, B.; de Pedro, M.J. y Enguix, R. (1995). "La Muntanya Assolada de Alzira y las necrópolis de la Cultura del Bronce Valenciano". Saguntum-PLAV, 28, Valencia, pp. 75–91.
