= Prehistory Museum of Valencia =

Archaeological museum in Valencia, Spain

Coordinates: 39°28′42″N 0°22′59″W

The Prehistory Museum of Valencia
- Museu de Prehistòria de València
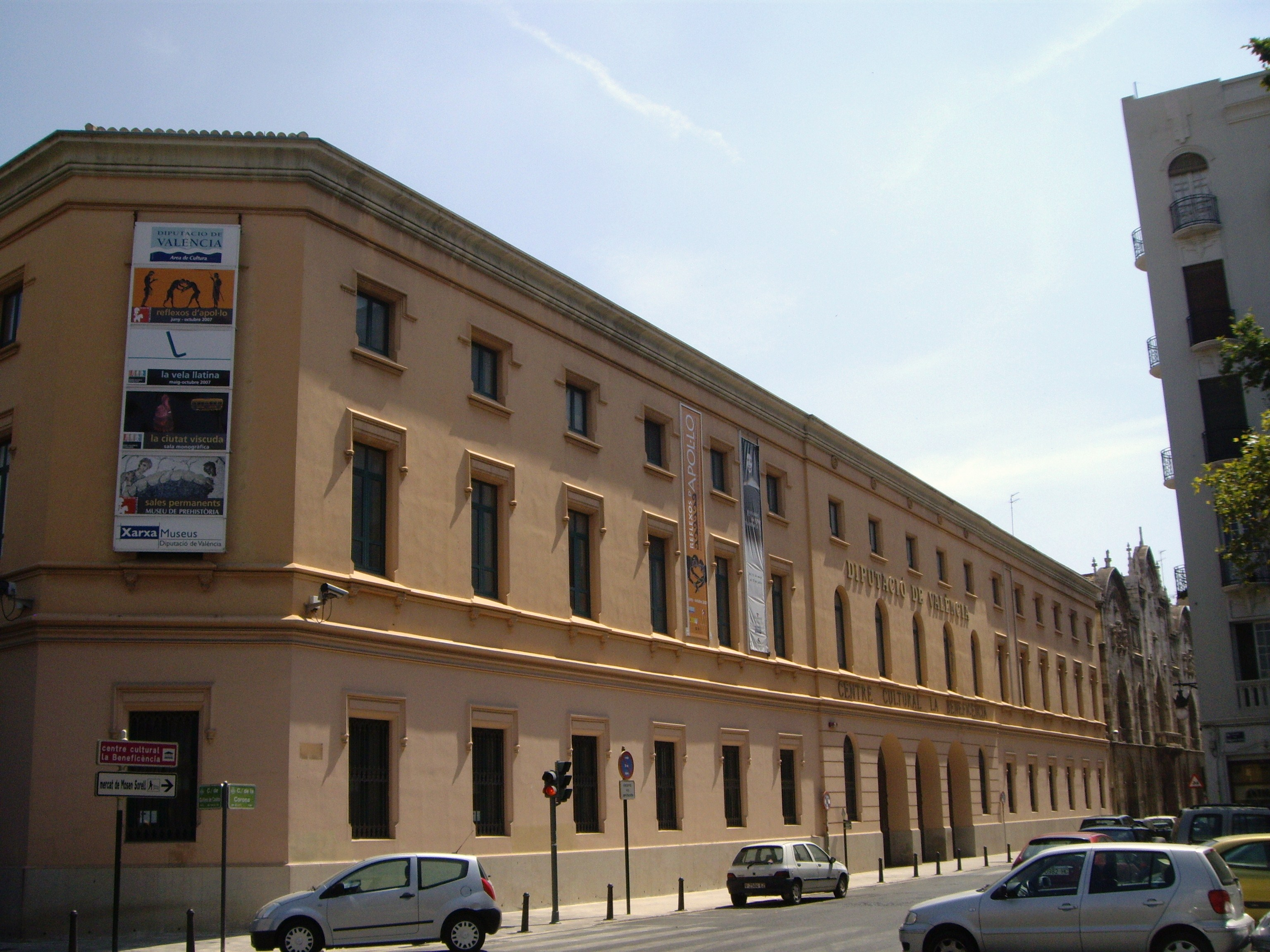
- Established: 1927
- Location: 36, Corona street – Valencia, (Spain)
- Type: Archaeological museum
- Curator: Diputación de Valencia
- Website: www.museuprehistoriavalencia.es

The Prehistory Museum of Valencia is a museum of the city of Valencia, in Spain, that exposes archaeological materials covering from Paleolithic to the Visigoths period.

From 1982, it has been part of The Old House of Charity, built in 1841 which highlights the Byzantine style church built in 1881. The Font de Mussa Mosaic is one of the most highlighted pieces.

In 1995 began the complete restoration of the building, carried out by the architect Rafael Rivera. The House of Charity, now the Museum of Prehistory, has a ground floor and two stories arranged around five courtyards. On the ground floor are located the shop, cafeteria, two temporary exhibition rooms, workshops, warehouses and the Restoration and Quaternary Wildlife laboratories, as well as offices of the Prehistoric Research Service, while the Church has become the Hall. On the first floor are the Library and the Permanent Facilities dedicated to Paleolithic Neolithic and Bronze Age. On the second floor permanent galleries devoted to the Iberian culture and the Roman World.

== Prehistory Research Service ==
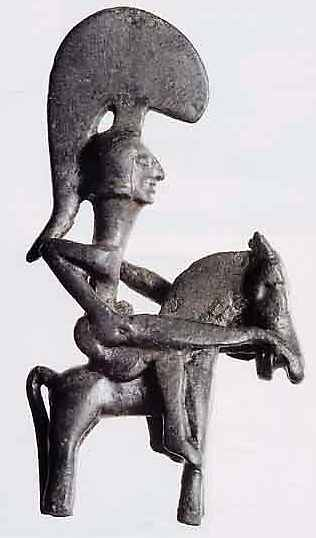
The Mogente Warrior, Iberian work housed in the Valencia Museum of Prehistory.

The Prehistory Research Service (Servicio de Investigación Prehistórica, SIP) of the Diputación of Valencia and the Museum of Prehistory are founded in 1927 at the request of Isidro Ballester Tormo as a scientific institution dedicated to research, preserve and promote the archaeological heritage of Valencia. In the museum have worked some of the most notable archaeologists of Spain Lluís Pericot Domingo Fletcher or Enrique Pla, who directed the SIP, or Miquel Tarradell Miracles Gil-Mascarell or Carmen Aranegui, who worked closely with this service. Since its creation, the SIP developed an intense archaeological field work as in the Bastide de les Alcuses of Moixent, the Black Cave (Cova Negra) of Xàtiva, the Cova del Parpalló of Gandia or Tossal de Sant Miquel of Llíria. The materials obtained from these excavations soon formed a collection whose scientific and heritage value has made the SIP and its museum one of the most important in Spain.

Currently, research projects cover all phases of the Prehistory and Antiquity of Valencia, with major actions developed in Cueva de Bolomor in Tavernes de la Valldigna, where appeared the oldest human remains in Valencian lands. Also excavations are conducted at the Eneolithic sites of Fuente Flores y Cinto Mariano (Requena), in the Bronze Age sites of Lloma Betxí (Paterna) and Les Raboses (Albalat dels Tarongers), in the Iberian villages of Bastida de les Alcusses and Los Villares (Caudete de las Fuentes) and the Ibero-Roman city of La Carencia de (Turís).

== The Library of the Prehistory Research Service ==
The SIP library was created in parallel with the Valencia Museum of Prehistory in 1927. It is a specialized library which began its bibliographic collection with donations and acquisitions. During the formation of the Library, the acquisitions of monographs were made taking into account a range of needs and would include: general works or reference, other studies that discuss the prehistory and archaeology prior to the founding of the SIP and those dealing with the latest advances in archaeology.

Similarly, from the outset there was the need to create a network of exchanges of publications, in order to increase the number of copies and to publicize the institution's own publications. Initially it was planned with the "Archivo de Prehistoria Levantina" although due to economic difficulties, it took 16 years between publication of the first and the second volume, as a result, the bibliographic exchange was performed with the Annual Report.

=== Publications ===
The SIP research task obtains results that are disseminated through scientific publications. The SIP edits the journal "Archivo de Prehistoria Levantina", and the series of monographs "Serie de Trabajos Varios" as well as catalogs of exhibitions held by the SIP, brochures, educational books, monographs, etc.

== See also ==
- List of museums in Spain
