= Carinate =

Shape in pottery, glassware and artistic design

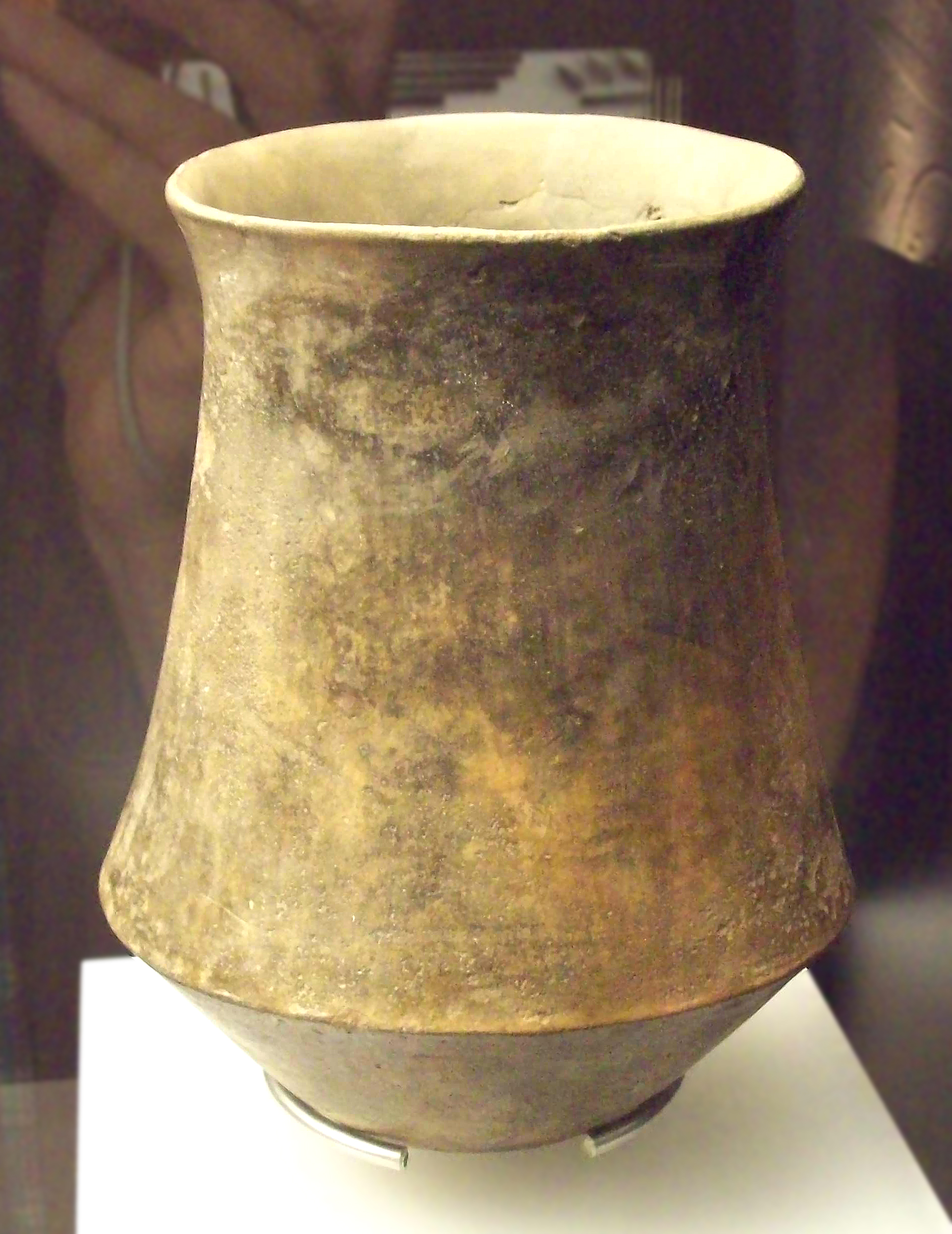
Argaric carinated vessel (Bronze Age)

Carinate is a shape in pottery, glassware and artistic design usually applied to amphorae or vases. The shape is defined by the joining of a rounded base to the sides of an inward sloping vessel. This design is seen in ancient cultures such as recovered in archaeological digs in such sites as the palace of Knossos in Minoan Crete. An alternative adjectival form of this design is carinated.

== See also ==
- Fluting
