= Lloma de Betxí =

Coordinates: 39.5269°N 0.5097°W

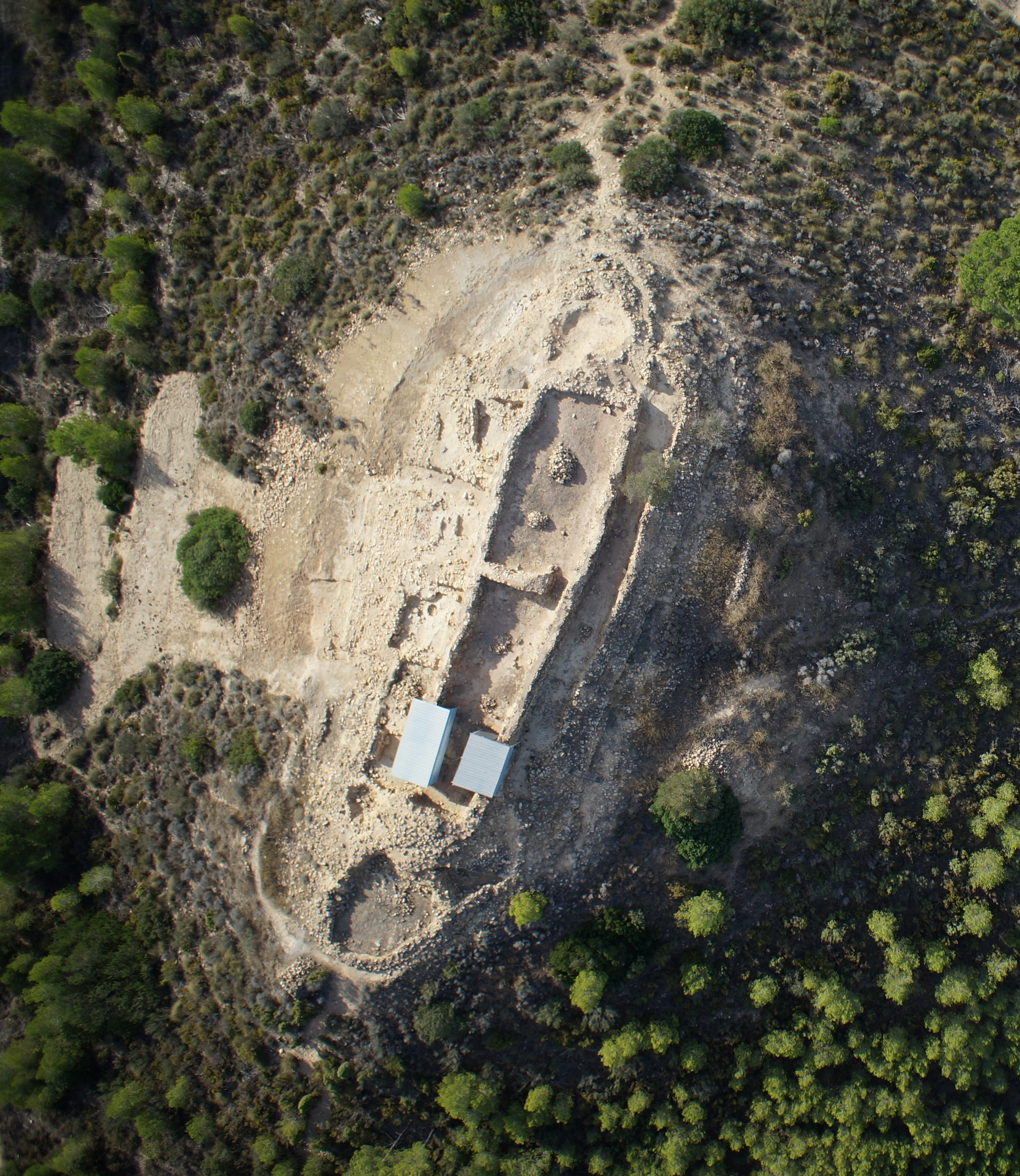
Orthophoto made by a drone of the Lloma de Betxí.

The Lloma de Betxí is a Bronze Age archaeological site in the municipality of Paterna (Valencian Community (Spain). It is on the top of a hill at 99m over the sea level and 30m over the surroundings. It is in the county of Paterna, nearby the Turia river, close to Valencia city. The chronology of the site: 1800 – 1300 B.C., part of the Valencian Bronze Age.

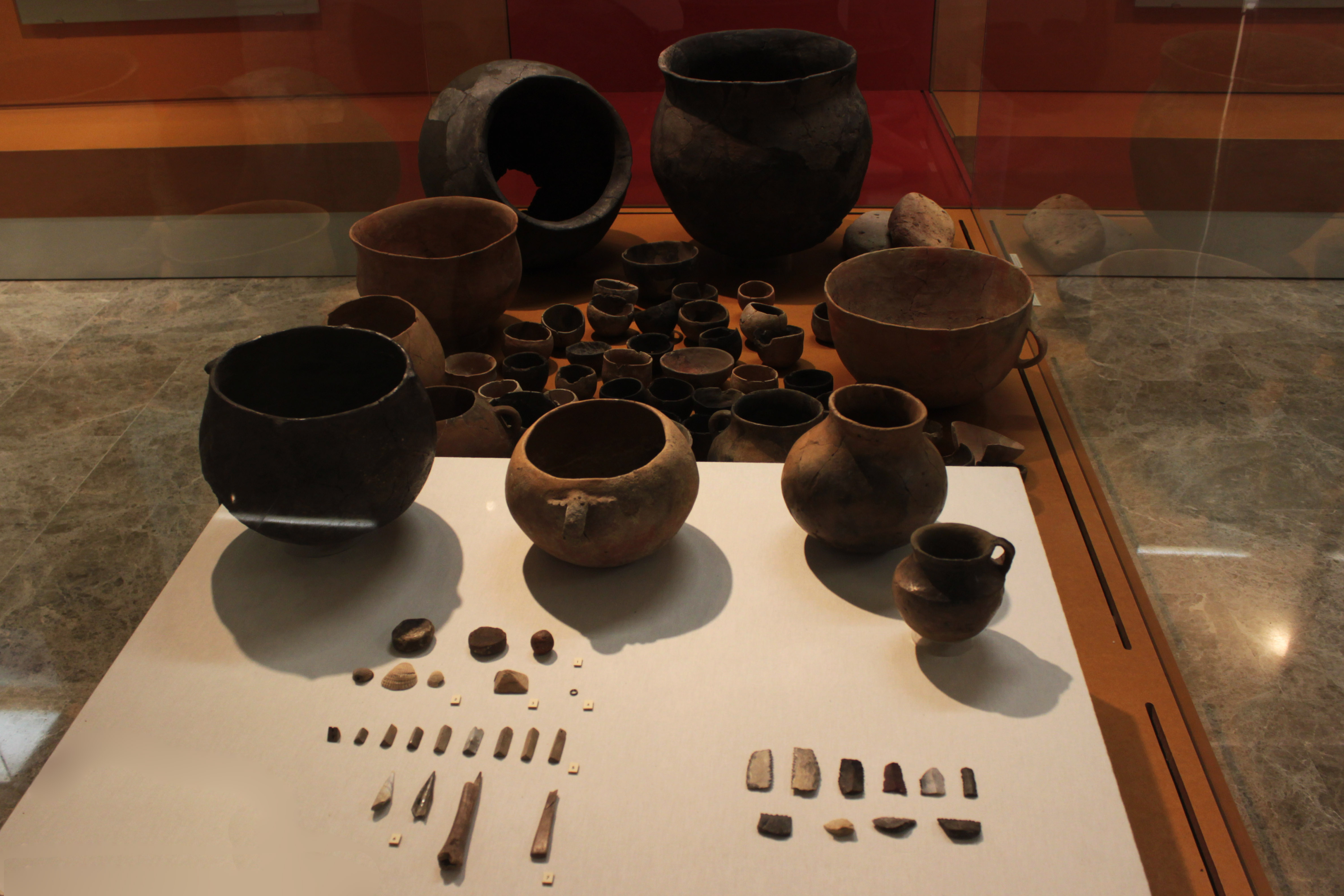
Pottery and flint tools found at Lloma de Betxí (Prehistory Museum of Valencia)

== Historiography and Excavation ==
The first information about the site appeared in 1928 and the author was Gómez Serrano. The next reference was included in the Gran Enciclopedia de la Región Valenciana, in 1973.

The first excavation was carried out in 1984 by Helena Bonet, Joan Bernabeu and María Jesús de Pedro. The excavations continued since 1985, under the management of María Jesús de Pedro, and ended in 2013. The recovered material was placed into the Museo de Prehistoria and Servicio de Investigación Prehistórica of the Valencian government.

== Chronology ==
Establishing the time frames for the Valencian Bronze Age is difficult. There are two main geographic areas: the argaric culture in the southern part, and the Valencian Bronze in the northern part. Three periods are considered: Early and Middle Bronze 1800/1700 - 1300/1200 B.C.; Late Bronze 1300/1200 – 1000/900 B.C. and Final Bronze 900 – 700 B.C. The chronology for the Lloma de Betxí is: 1800 -1300 B.C.

The Bronze Age period in Valencia shows evidence of a rise in the population, compared with the previous stage. The differences between the different sites of the Bronze Age in the area are considerable in terms of location, visibility and size.

== Location and Environment ==
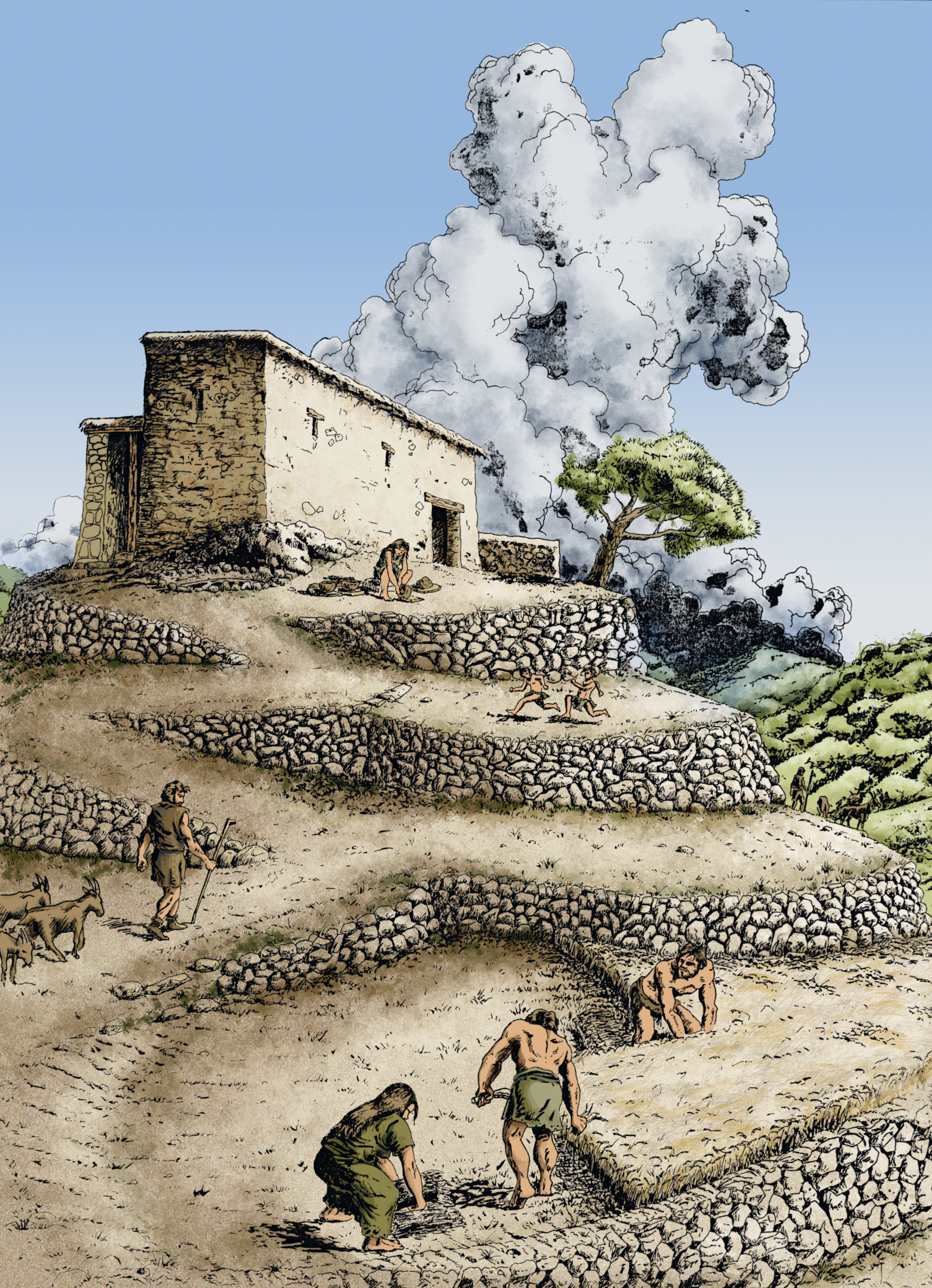
Interpretation of Lloma de Betxí settlement

The settlement is located in a small elevation, composed of clay, over a bed of stones and gravel. The size is 50x20 m and the orientation is NW-SE, and rises 30m over the surrounding plane. The area nearby presents two different environments: the Turia alluvial plain, with very productive soils, and the mountain zone that is close to the river in the north, with a low agricultural potential. In general, the agricultural possibilities of the surrounding area of Lloma de Betxí are quite good. The vegetation during the Subboreal period is typical of a Thermo-Mediterranean zone, with an eroded forest. But there was variability in some areas such as the close areas to the river bed and in the shaded spots of the mountains. The climate in the period was more humid than today, so the eroding of the vegetation would be caused by human intervention on the environment.

== Subsistence Bases ==
During the third and second millennium B.C., the economy basis of the society, are not changed by the metallurgy of copper, in the area of Valencia. The changes are associated with farming and cattle raising. The most characteristic are those related to the grain crops (sickles, storing pottery, mills, etc.). Other vegetables were also grown such as peas and beans. Also the acorns, which were very important for the cattle feeding too.

The fauna remainings show how important were the domestic species: sheep and goats, followed by oxen, pigs and dogs. During the Bronze Age, the activities related to cattle raising, were even more important than in the previous periods. The products associated with these activities, such as the milk, cheese, wool, etc., will continue to gain relevance. There were also deer bones in the site, showing the importance of hunting activities for these communities.

Metallurgic activities were also performed on the site. An anvil and the residues of smelting were found. Some ivory pieces were found in one storage area. These indicate that Lloma de Betxí was included in trading circuits.

The sedimentologic studies show important works on the topology of the elevation to make it suitable for the purposes of the inhabitants. The knowledge of the materials properties is evident, as it can be seen in the usage of clay for the cistern waterproofing.

== Funerary rituals ==
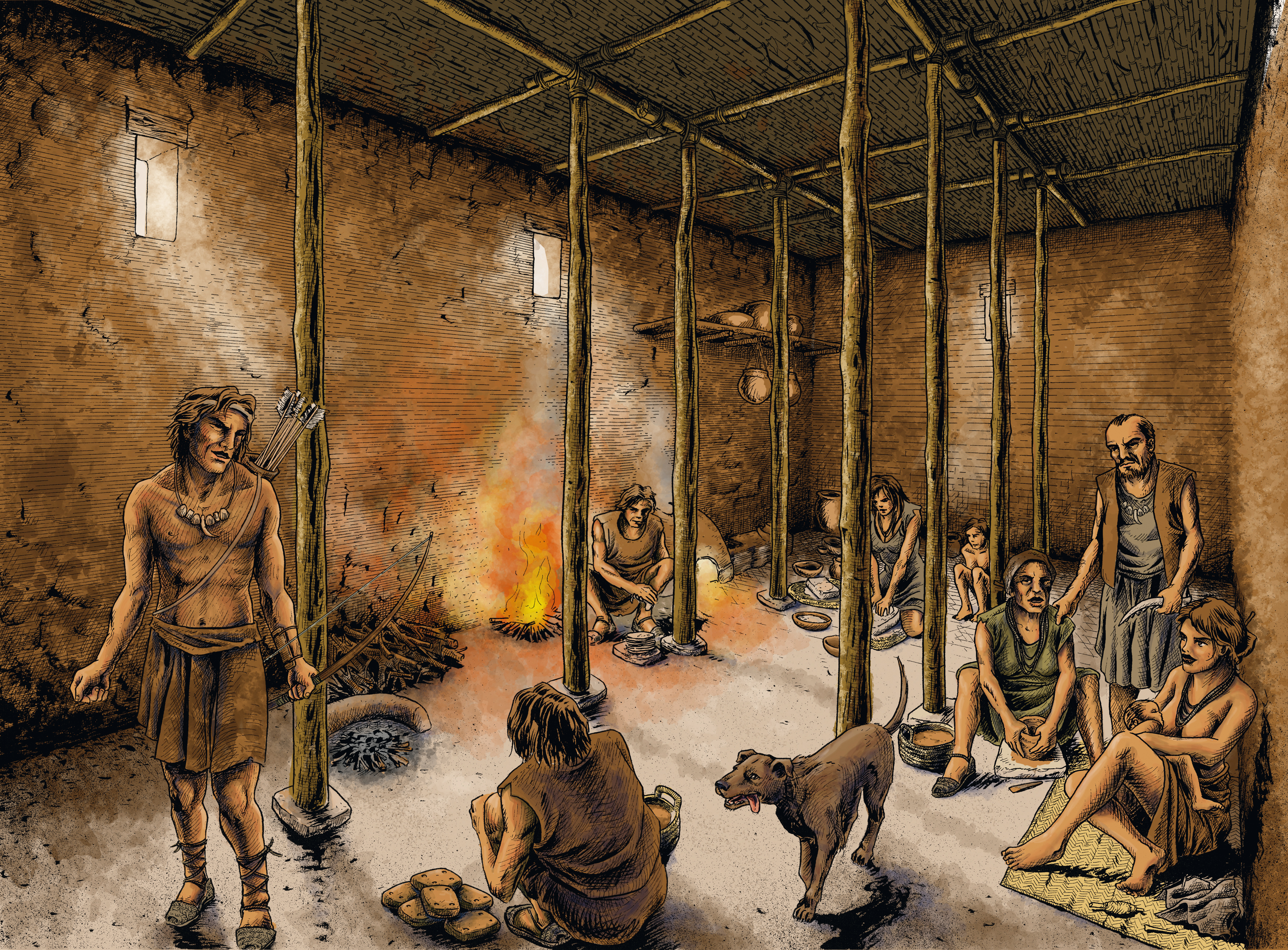
Lloma de Betxí indoor interpretation

The presence of human remains scattered among the remains of fauna is found. The handling of human remains is a fact in other contexts of the Bronze Age. This has been interpreted as the existence of a new funeral ritual. In addition, there appeared two human burials: a senile individual along the skeleton of a small canid, and other structure bounded by a circular stone in a fetal position with legs bent and arms.

== Interpretation ==
Lloma de Betxí is located on a small hill with a height of 99m above the sea level. The upper deck houses a construction of two rooms and a side corridor, with a total area of 3750 m2, including terracing. Defensive concerns should be in the background, due to the absence of walls and its low altitude. The visual control is minimal and the only visible nearby village, is the Carassols, across the Turia. Therefore, their exploitation would be related to the cereal crop in nearby lands.

Its cultural sequence is long and covers, based on the carbon-14, from the early Bronze Age and Middle (3725 ± 60 BP and 3505 ± 55 BP) to the last centuries of the second millennium B.C.

This site has provided relevant to the interpretation of the construction techniques of the Bronze Age elements. First, the presence of a complex system of terracing on the slope, which at the top are occupied by a building consisting of two large departments and a side corridor. The reconstruction of the two upper rooms, from the accumulated sedimentation, yields a result of a height greater than 4m. This allows considering the existence of an upper floor or attic, which could be used as housing or domestic space.

The model village, reminiscent of the Motillas, talks about a number of places where the economic activities, of a population living in the plains, are concentrated. The large central and higher structure could have been used as a communal space for storage and to carry out various economic and craft activities. In the archaeological record were not found clues of prestige items, but a lot of grain, enough to feed a small group. The size of the settlement does not seem to point to the site as a relevant location in a broad territorial framework and resembles a small village dedicated to agriculture.

== Bibliography ==
- Grau, E. (1990). L'ús de la fusta en jaciments valencians de l'Edat del Bronze a època visigoda. Dades etnobotànics i reconstrucció ecològica segons l'antracologia.
- Gómez-Serrano, N.P. (1929). D´Arqueología, excavaciones en Valencia” Anales del centro de cultura valenciana II, número 3 y 4.
- Llobregat, E. (1962). Los precedentes y el ambiente comarcal de la Valentia romana”. Papeles del laboratorio de Prehistoria de Valencia, número I
- Pla, E. (1973). Enciclopedia de la Región Valenciana, tomo VIII.
- Pedro de Micho, M. J. de. (1998). La Lloma de Betxí, (Paterna, Valencia) un poblado de la Edad del Bronce. Servicio de Investigación Prehistórica de la Diputación de Valencia, ISBN 84-7795-166-7.
- Pedro de Micho, M. J. de. (2006). "El grupo doméstico y las actividades de mantenimiento de una aldea de la Edad del Bronce, la Lloma de Betxí (Paterna, Valencia)”. Las mujeres en la Prehistoria.
- Pedro de Micho, M.J. de., Soler, B. (coord), Vivir junto al Turia hace 4000 años: la Lloma de Betxí, Museo de Prehistoria de Valencia, 2015.
- Pedro Michó, M. J. y Grau Almero, E. (1991): «Técnicas de construcción en la Edad del Bronce la Lloma de Betxí (Paterna, Valencia) ». IInd Deià Conference of Prehistory, vol. I: Archaeological Techniques and Technology, Tempus Reparatum, Bar Internacional Series, 573, oxford, p. 339-353.
