= Facies (disambiguation) =

Facies is a body of rock with specified characteristics.

Facies may also refer to:

- Facies (medical)
- Facies of the pile dwellings and of the dammed settlements

== See also ==
- Feces
- Faces
