= Polada culture =

Bronze Age culture

- Geographical range: Northern Italy
- Period: Bronze Age
- Dates: c. 2200 — 1500 BCE
- Major sites: Lavagnone, Ledro
- Preceded by: Bell Beaker culture, Remedello culture
- Followed by: Terramare culture, Facies of the pile dwellings and of the dammed settlements

The Polada culture (22nd to 16th centuries BCE) is the name for a culture of the ancient Bronze Age which spread primarily in the territory of modern-day Lombardy, Veneto and Trentino, characterized by settlements on pile-dwellings.

The name derives from the small Polada peat bog (Stagno della Polada) in Lombardy, between Lonato del Garda, Menasasso, and Desenzano del Garda. The first findings attributed to this culture were discovered in the years between 1870 and 1875 as a result of intense activities of reclamation in that bog, and were collected by Giovanni Rambotti. The dating of carbon-14 on the finds place them between c. 1380 BCE and c. 1270 BCE. Other major sites are found in the area between Mantua, the Lake Garda and the Lake of Pusiano.

It was succeeded in the Middle Bronze Age by the facies of the pile dwellings and of the dammed settlements and the Terramare culture.

== Chronology ==
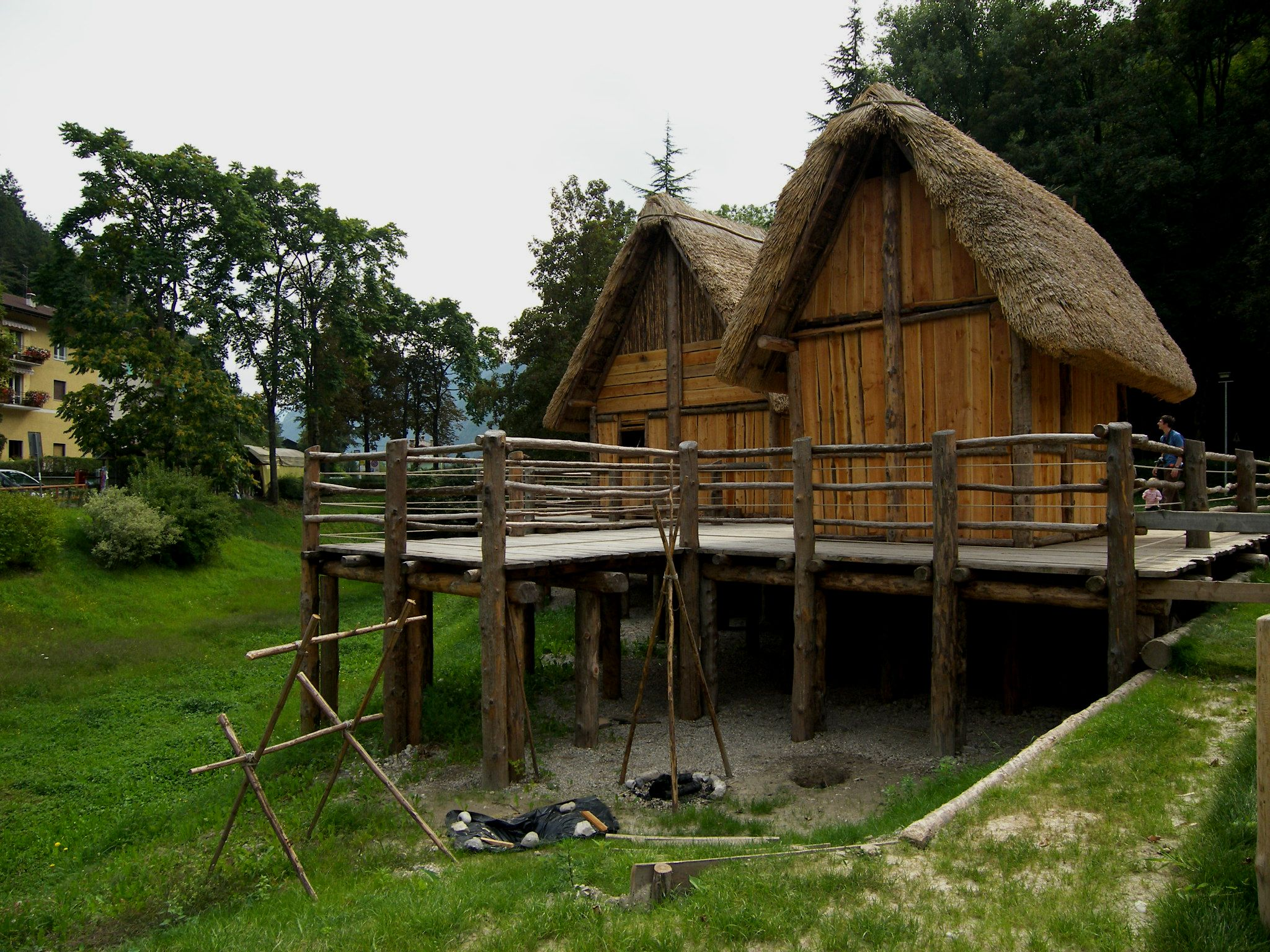
Molina di Ledro settlement reconstruction, Ledro Museum

The Polada culture is usually assigned to the period from 2200 to 1500 BCE, or according to A.F. Harding (2000) from 2400 to 1400 BCE, David-Elbiali & David (2009) limit the time span between 2200 and 1750 BCE.

The so-called tavolette enigmatiche or Brotlaibidol found at Polada and in the Lago di Ledro date from the more recent period of the South Alpine Early Bronze Age and are correlated with the Polada culture. According to the chronology proposed by Renato Perini, they correspond to the Bronzo Antico II and Bronzo Antico III (Polada-B context). These clay objects can be dated in Italy in a period from 2050 BCE (Polada B, Lavagnone 2) to 1400/1300 BCE (Lavagnone, Isolone di Mincio).

According to Paul Reinecke's chronological system, the Polada culture is included in the Bronze Age stages BzA2 to BzC2, but according to David-Elbiali & David (2009) only BzA1a, BzA1b and BzA2a, i.e. Early and Developed Early Bronze Age.

The settlement of Lavagnone 1 can be assigned to 2080/2050 BCE. Lavagnone 2 existed for 65 years (from 2050 to 1991/1985 BCE) and Lavagnone 3 began around 1984 BCE.

== Origin ==
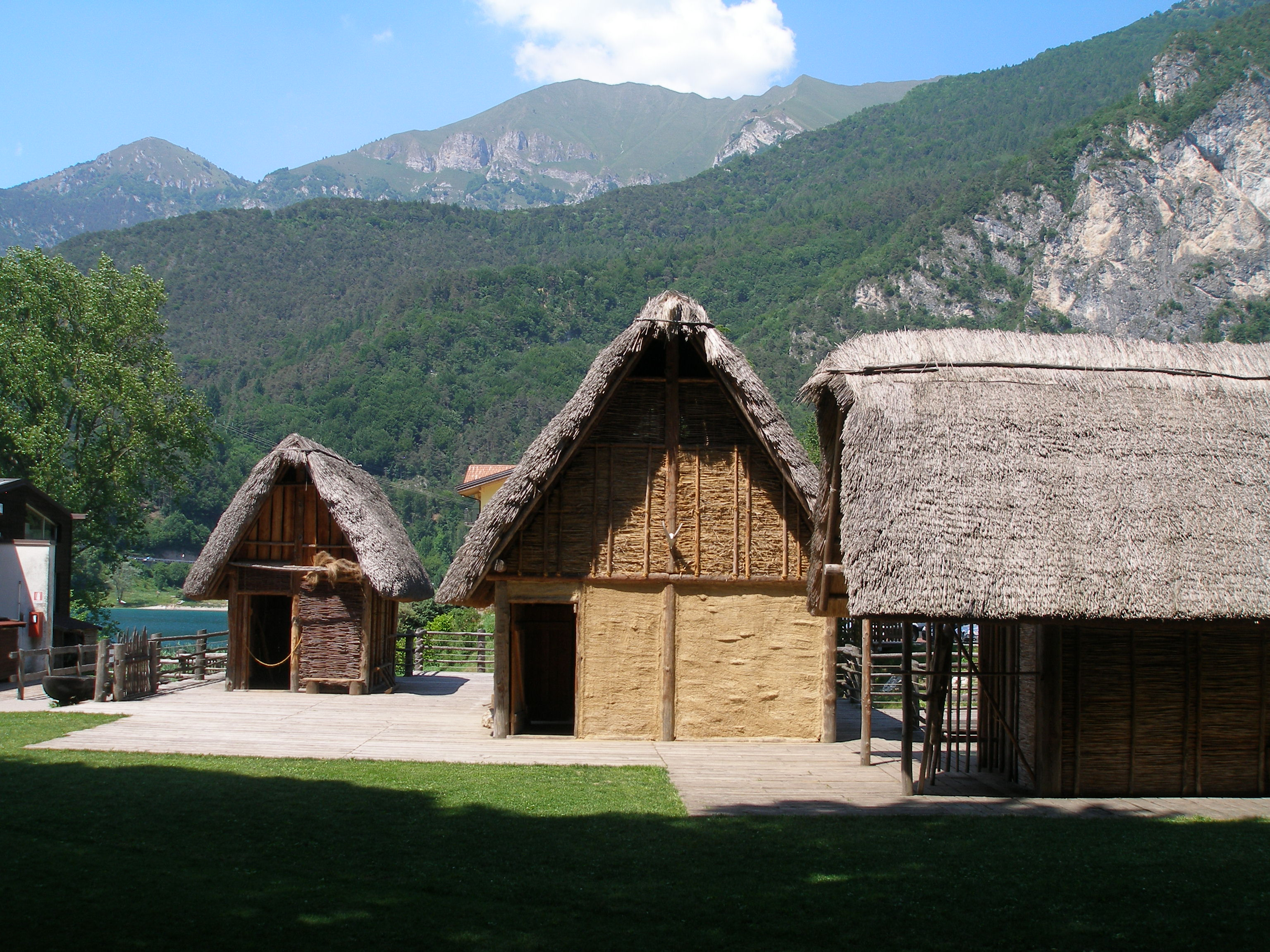
Molina di Ledro

There are some commonalities with the previous Bell Beaker Culture including the usage of the bow and a certain mastery in metallurgy. Apart from that, the Polada culture does not correspond to the Beaker culture nor to the previous Remedello culture.

Together with the Polada culture in Northern Italy, the following cultures lived around the Alpine arch:

- The Leithaprodersdorf culture and Unterwölblinger culture in Austria
- Straubing culture and Singen culture in Southern Germany
- The Rhône culture in Southern France
- Ljubljana culture in Slovenia

== Ethnic identity ==
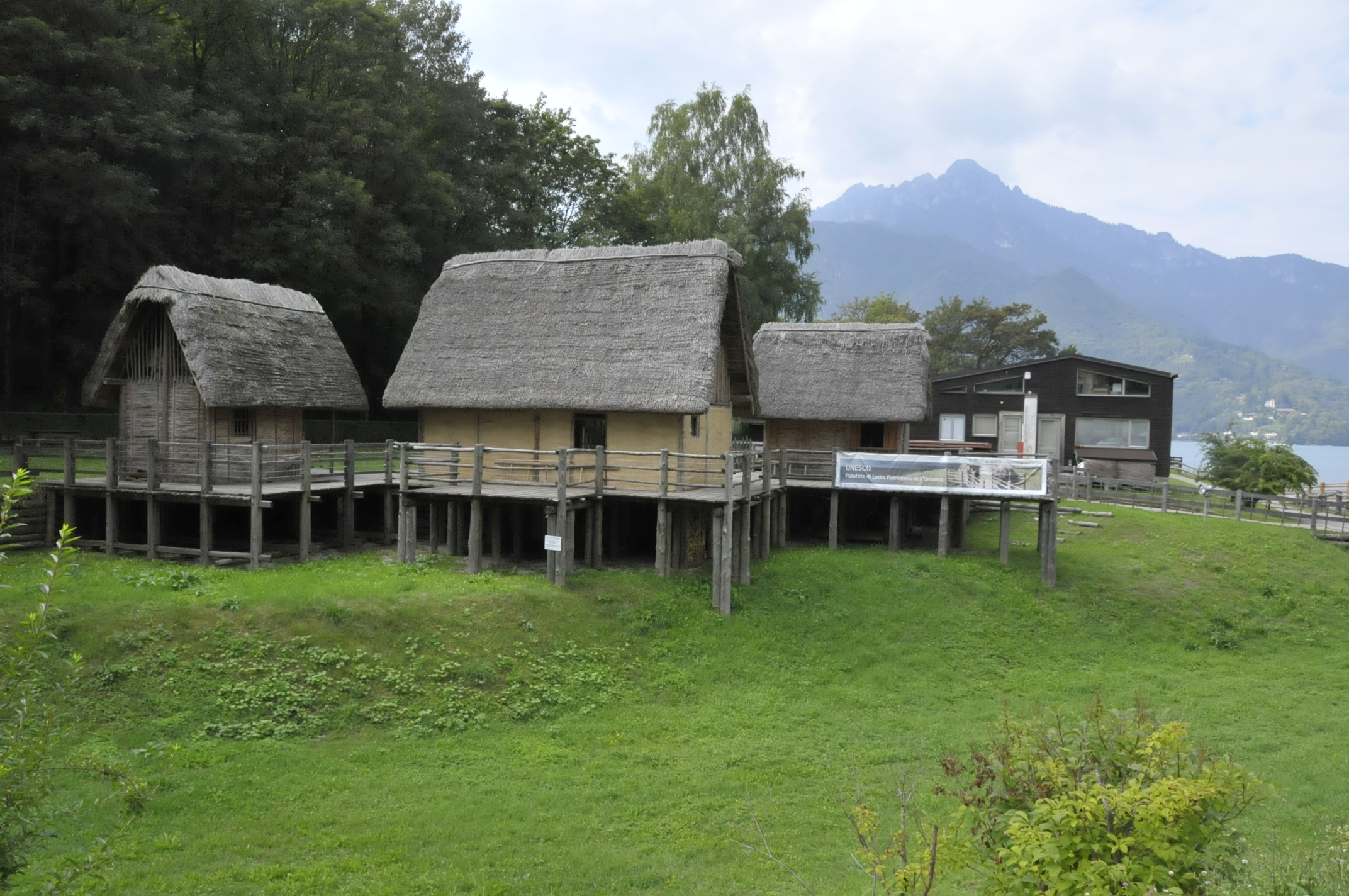
Molina di Ledro

According to Barfield the appearance of Polada culture is connected to the movement of new populations coming from southern Germany and from Switzerland.

For Bernard Sergent, the origin of the Ligurian linguistic family (which he considers distantly related to the Italic and Celtic families) can be traced back to the Rhône and Polada cultures, both strongly linked to Central European Unetice traditions.

Possibly inspired by scholars such as Wolfgang Helbig, Luigi Pigorini argued that the Italic peoples entered Italy from the north-Alpine region, initially establishing lake-dwelling settlements associated with the Polada culture.

== Diffusion ==
Most of the sites associated with this culture have been discovered in the vicinity of Lake Garda, between eastern Lombardy, Trentino and western Veneto, as well as around Lago di Viverone and Lake Maggiore in Piedmont. In eastern Veneto and Friuli, the Polada pottery shows strong affinities with contemporaneous materials from Lower Austria and Hungary, which points to the existence of close contacts with transalpine communities.

Its influences are also found in the cultures of the Early Bronze Age of Liguria, Romagna, Corsica and Sardinia (Bonnanaro culture).

== Settlements ==
The settlements in the area of lakes and marshes of Moraine are stilt houses resting on "drainage" of horizontal trunks, arranged in layered platform or cassette. They had a relatively limited extension, about a hectare, and a population between 200 and 300 people per village.

== Economy ==
The economy was based on breeding, hunting, farming, fishing and large-scale berry harvesting.

In a site of this culture, near Solferino, was found the oldest example of domesticated horse in Italy.

== Material culture ==
If the pottery is still coarse, other human activities grow and develop: lithic industry, in bone and horn, wood and metals. The Bronze tools and weapons show similarities with those of the Unetice Culture and other groups in the north of Alps including the Singen and Straubing groups.

== Gallery ==
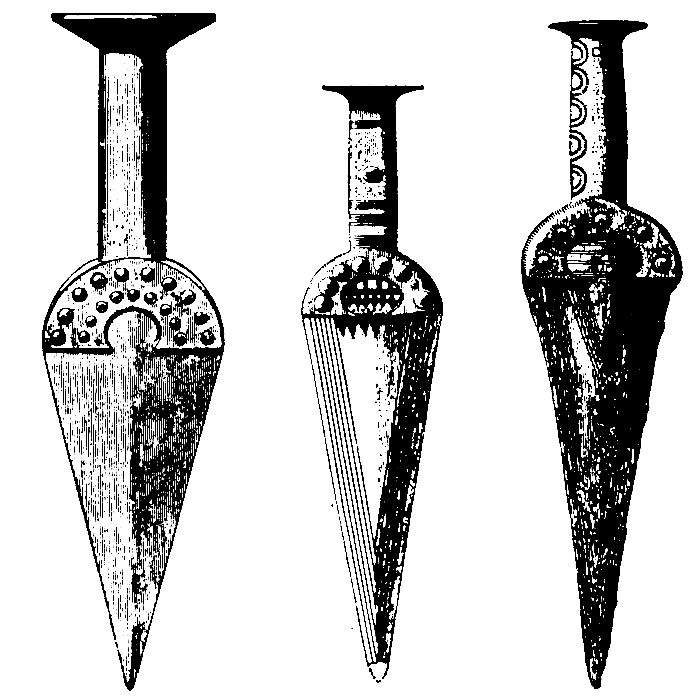
Bronze daggers

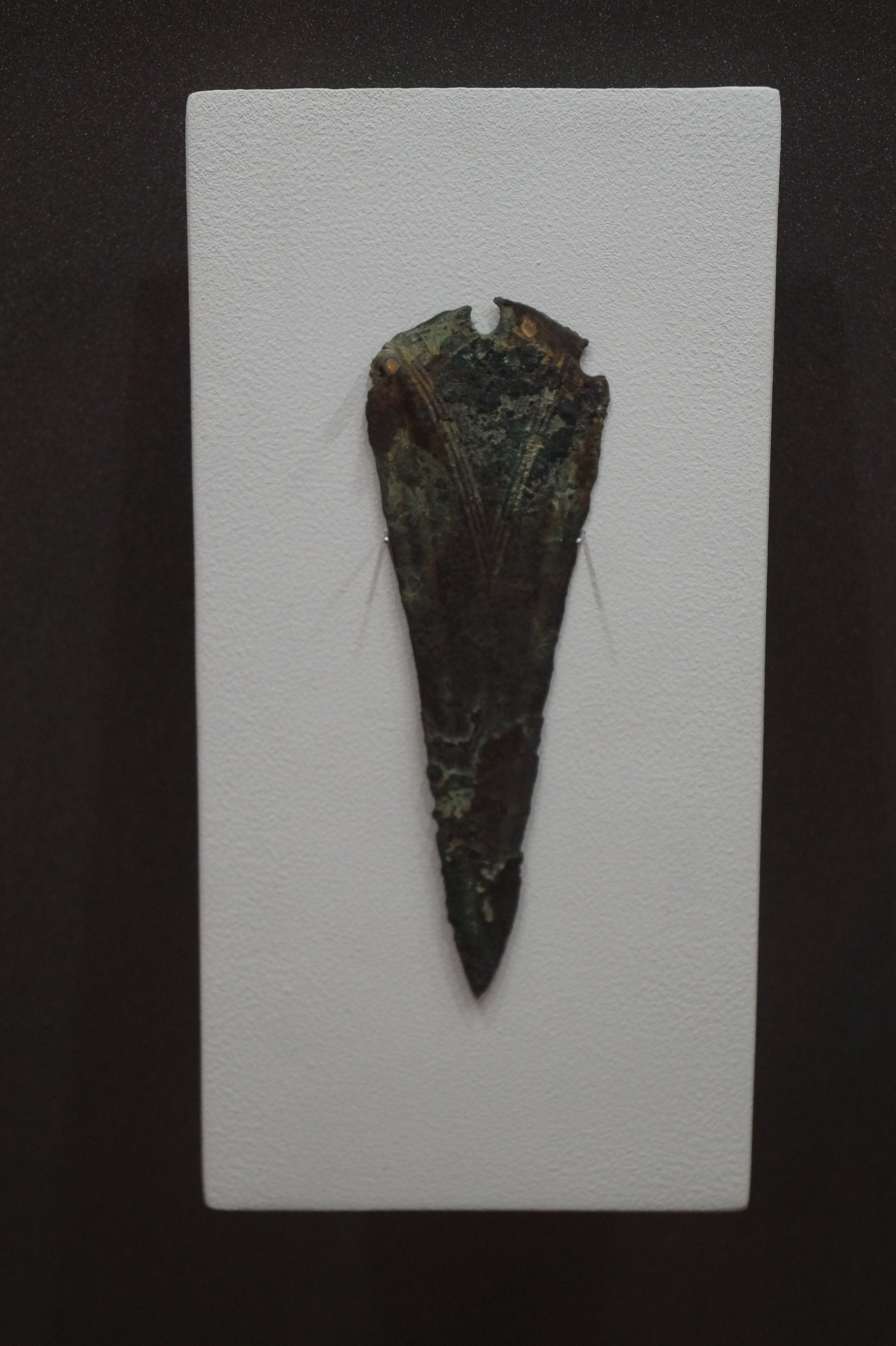
Bronze Dagger

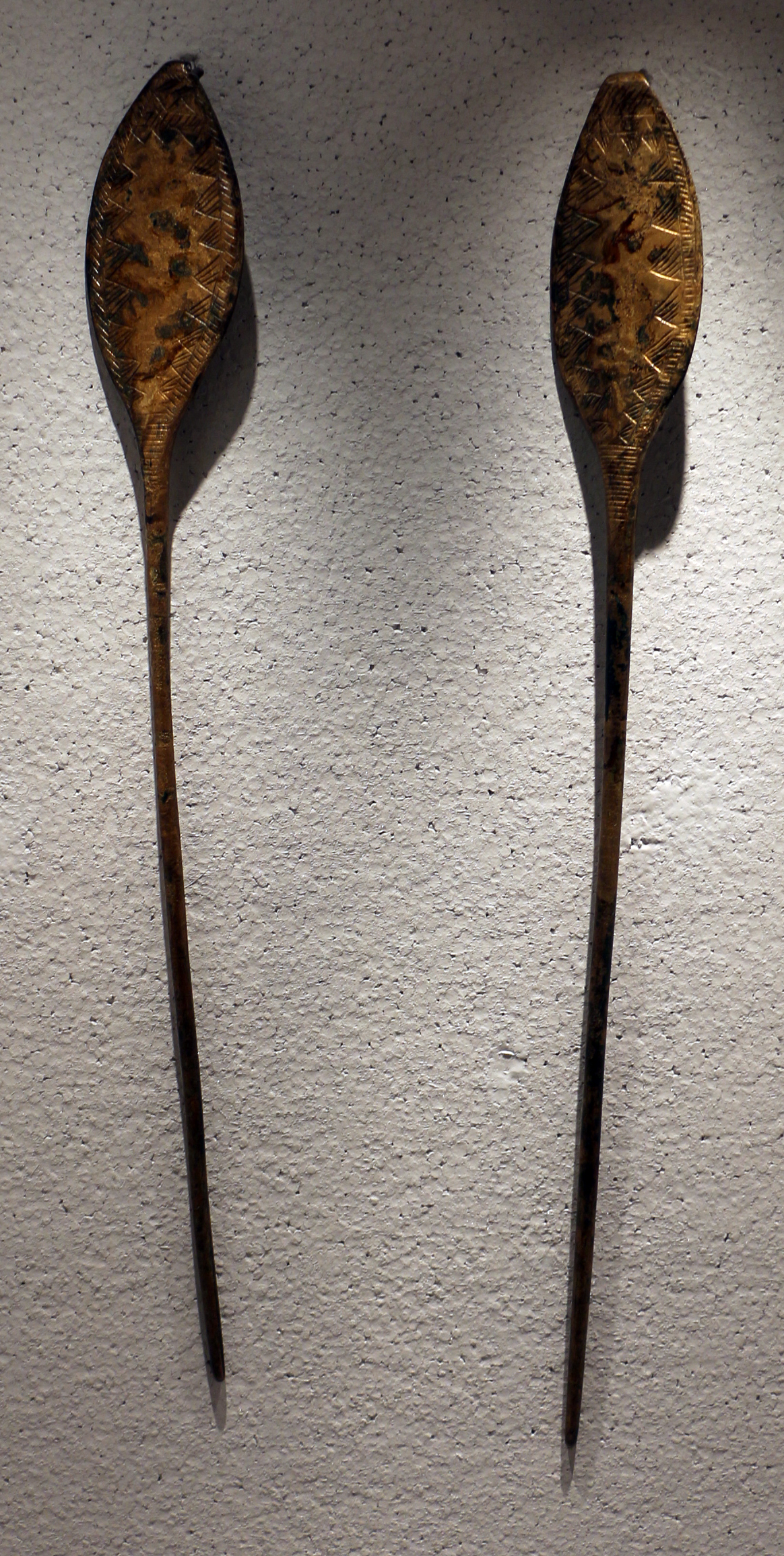
Bronze pins

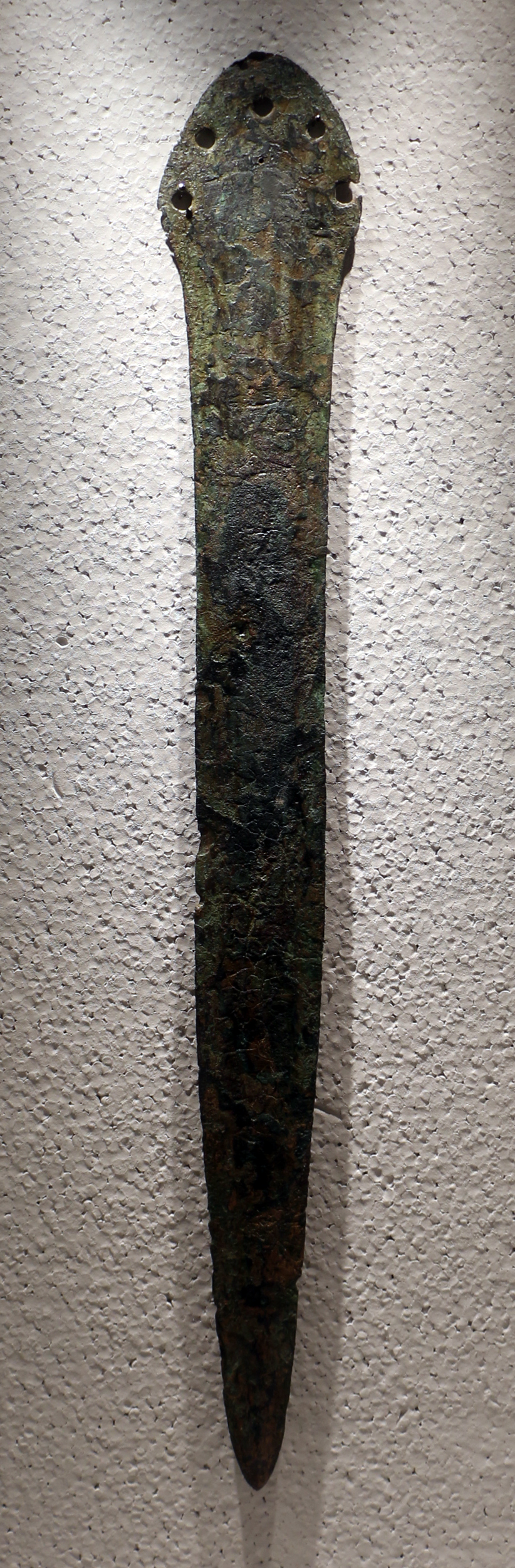
Bronze sword, c. 1600 BCE

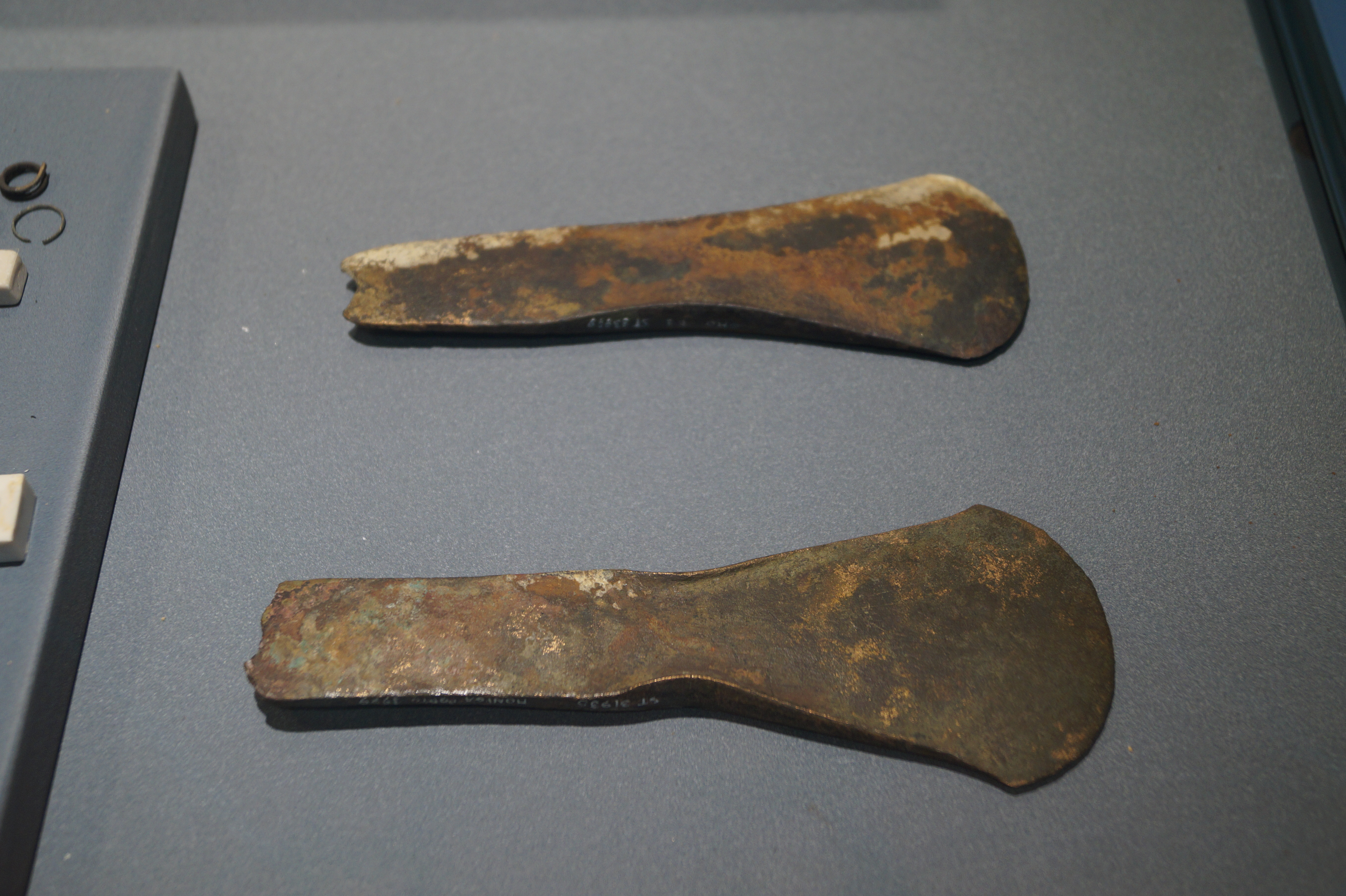
Bronze axes from Moniga del Garda

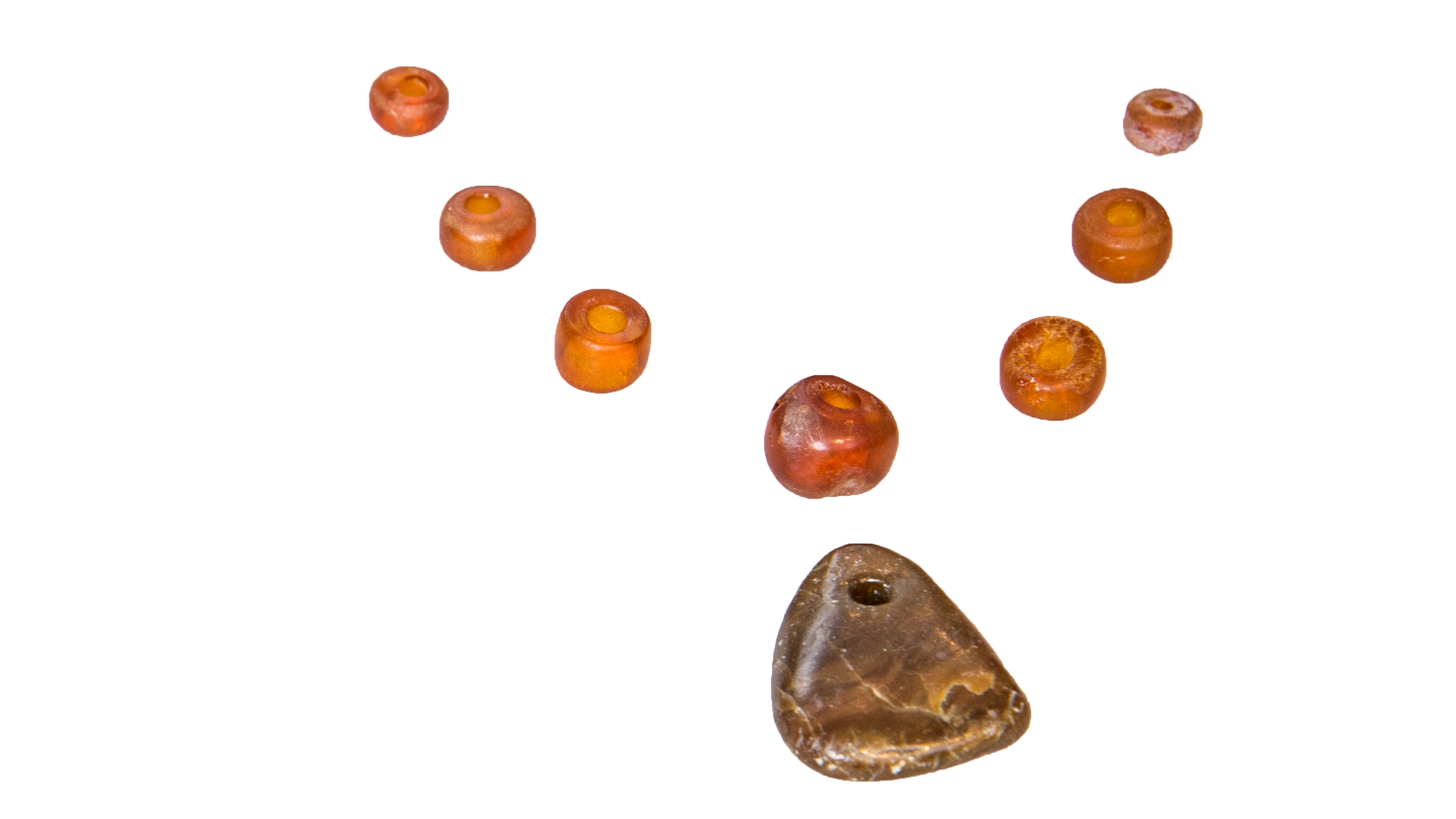
Amber necklace

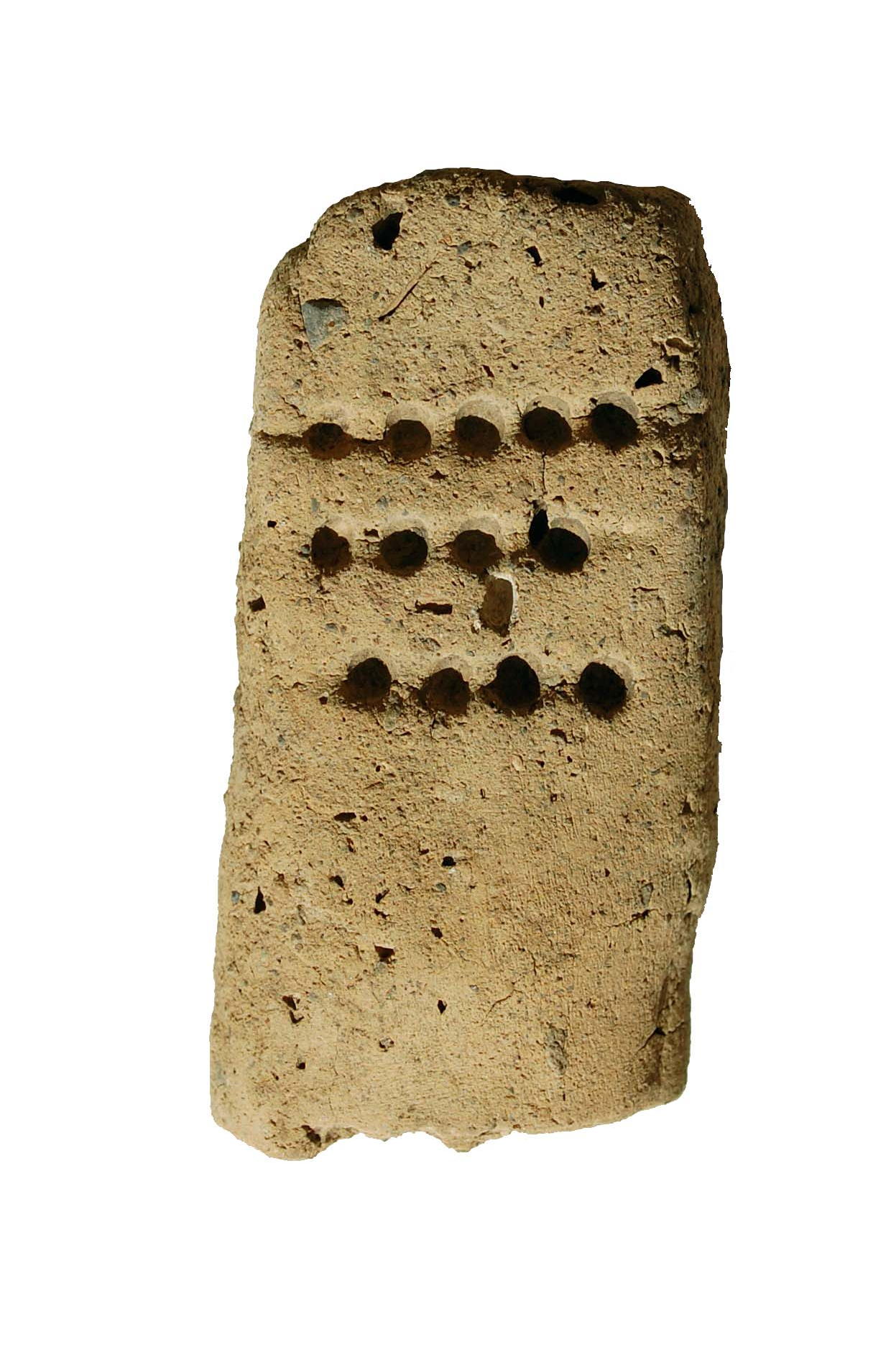
Tavoletta enigmatica - 'enigmatic tablet'

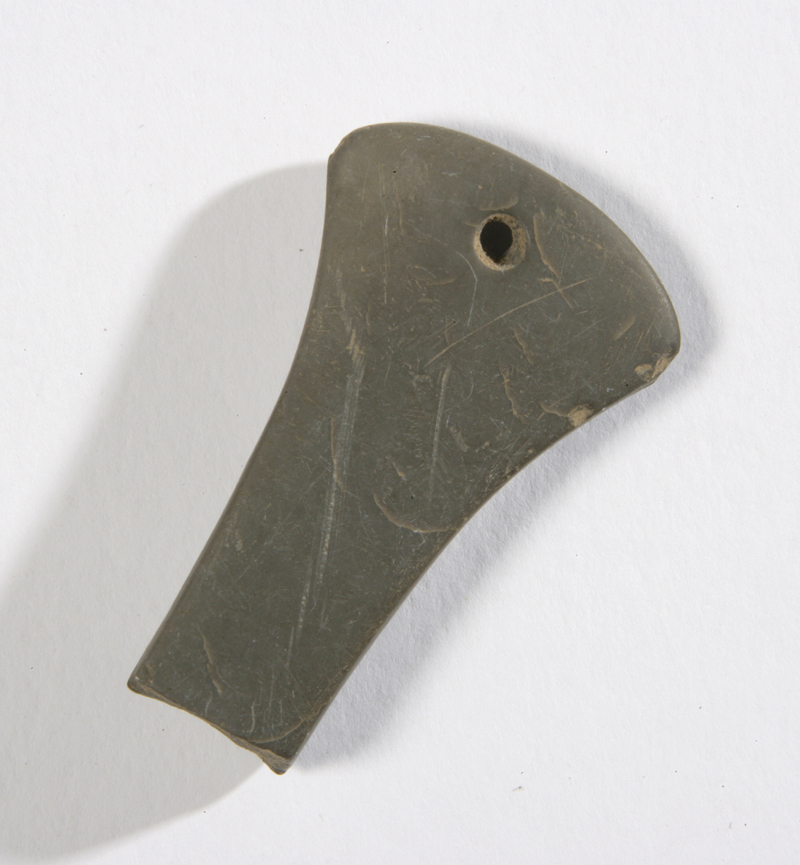
Stone wrist-guard

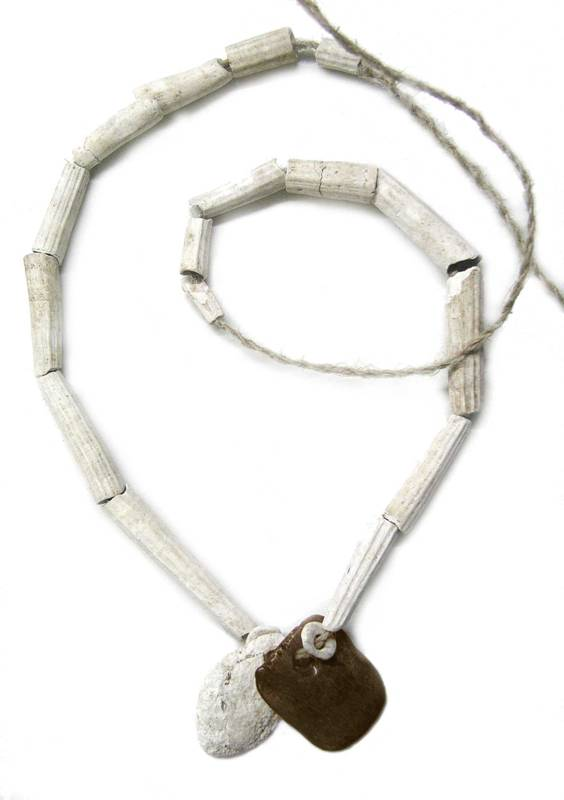
Necklace

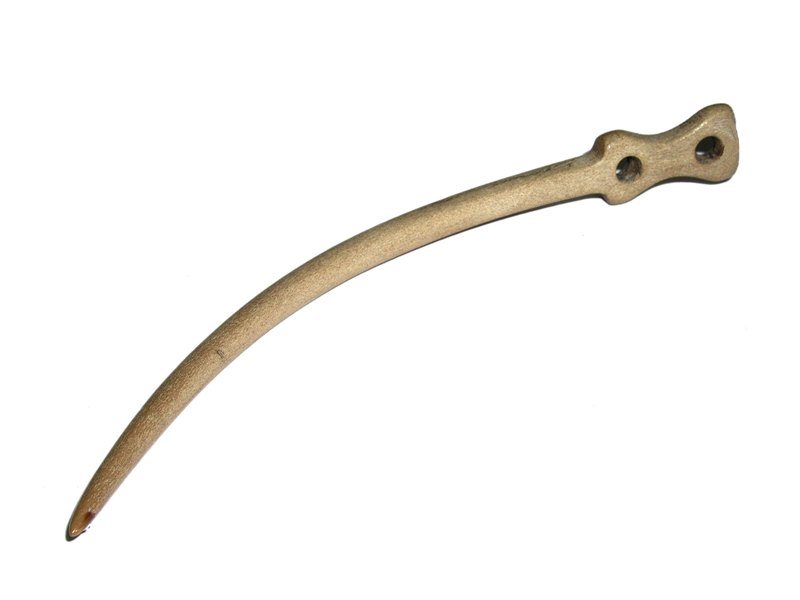
Bone pin

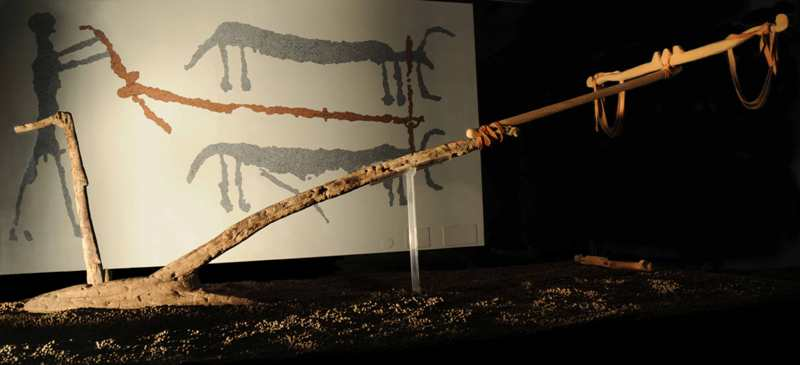
Plow

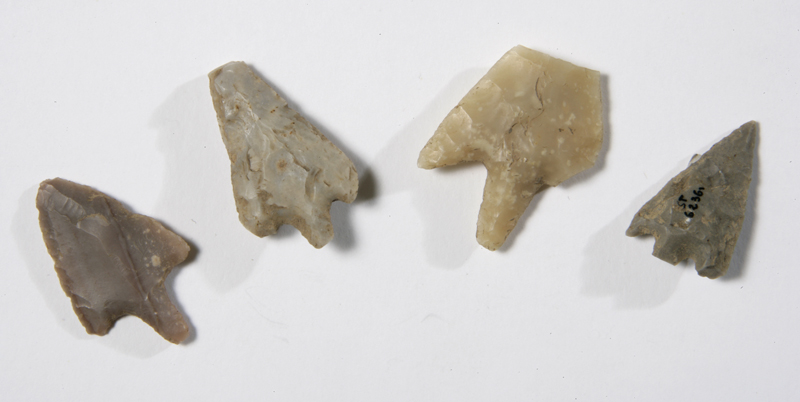
Flint arrowheads

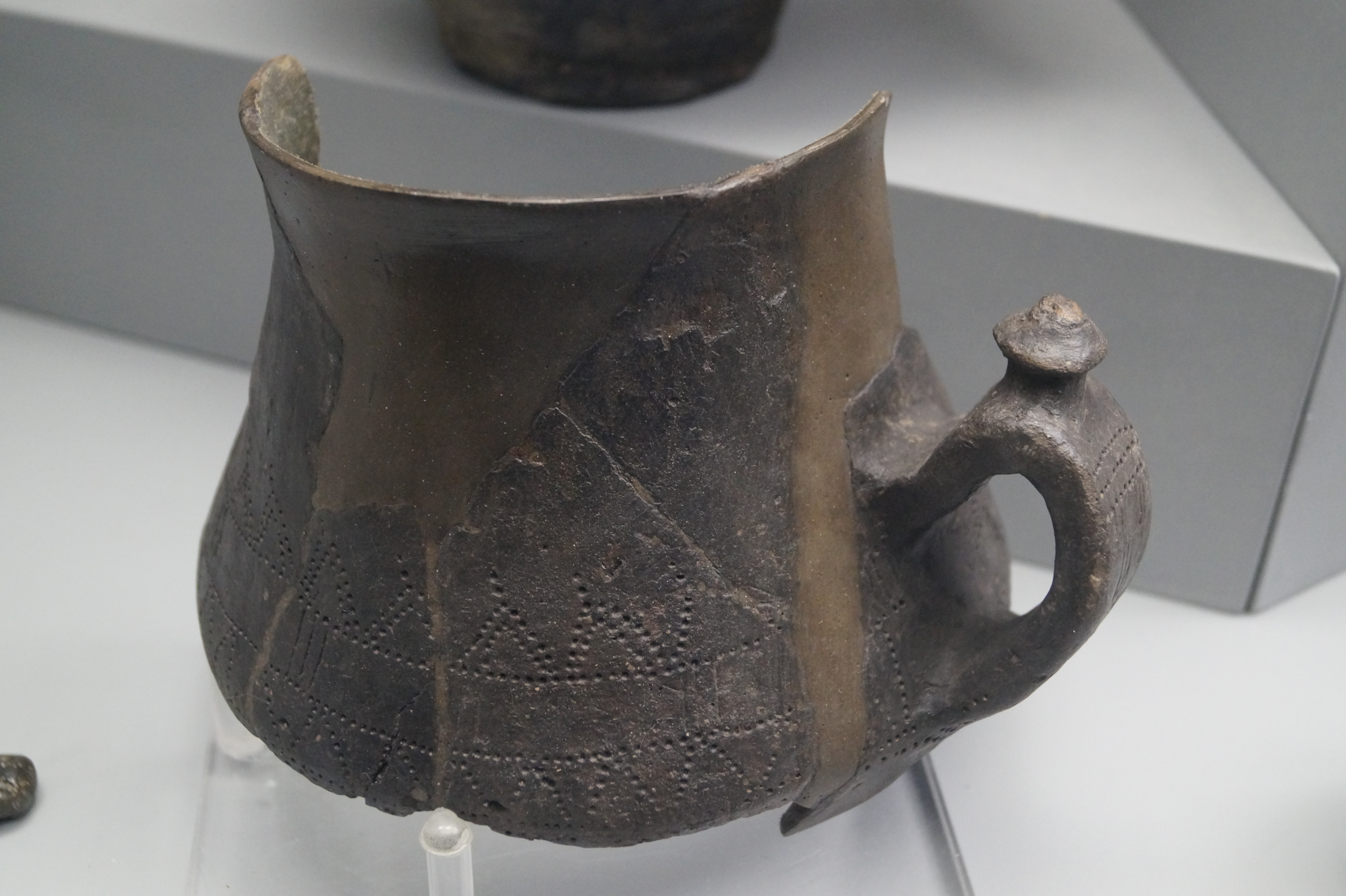
Pottery

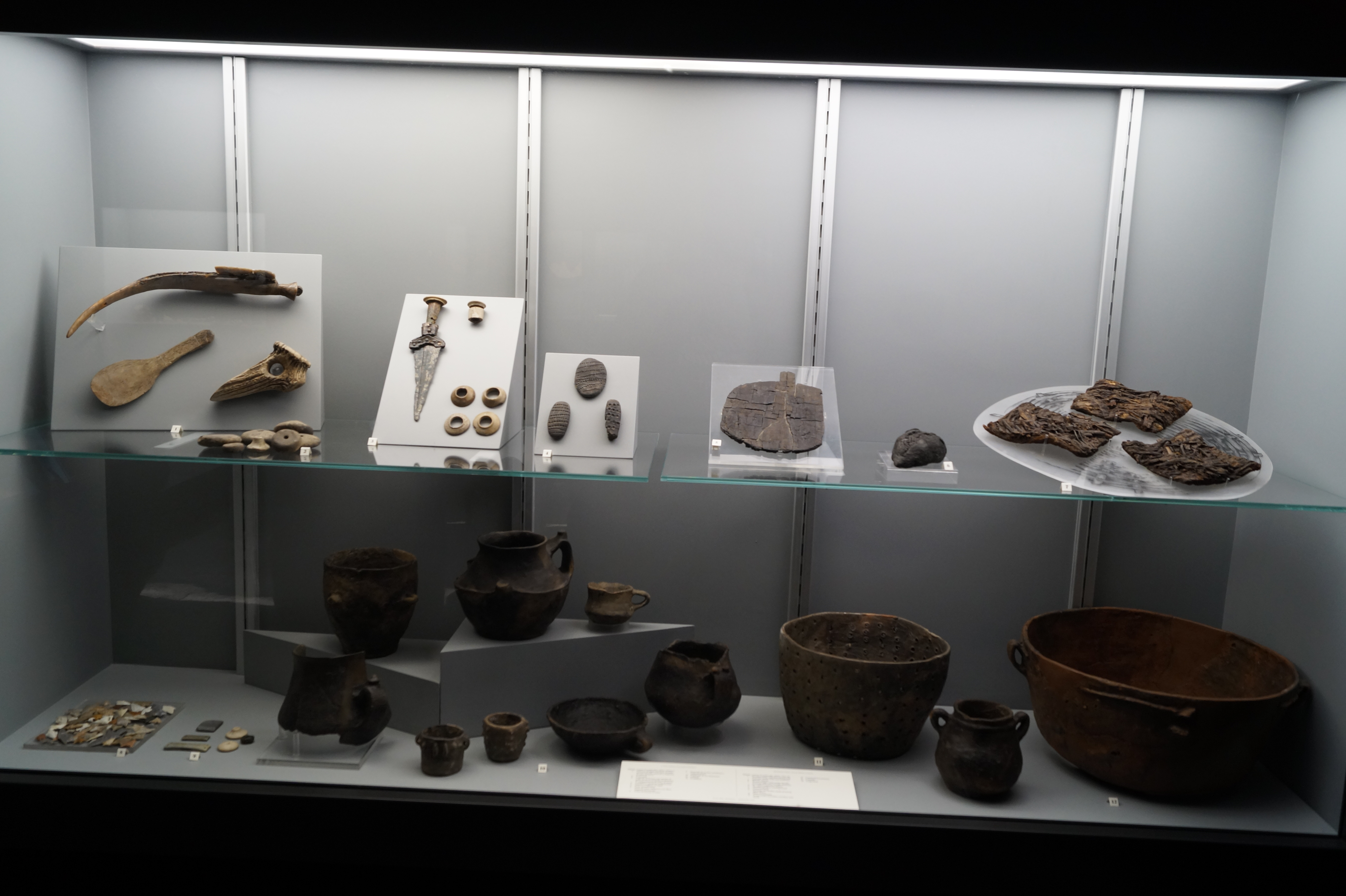
Various artefacts

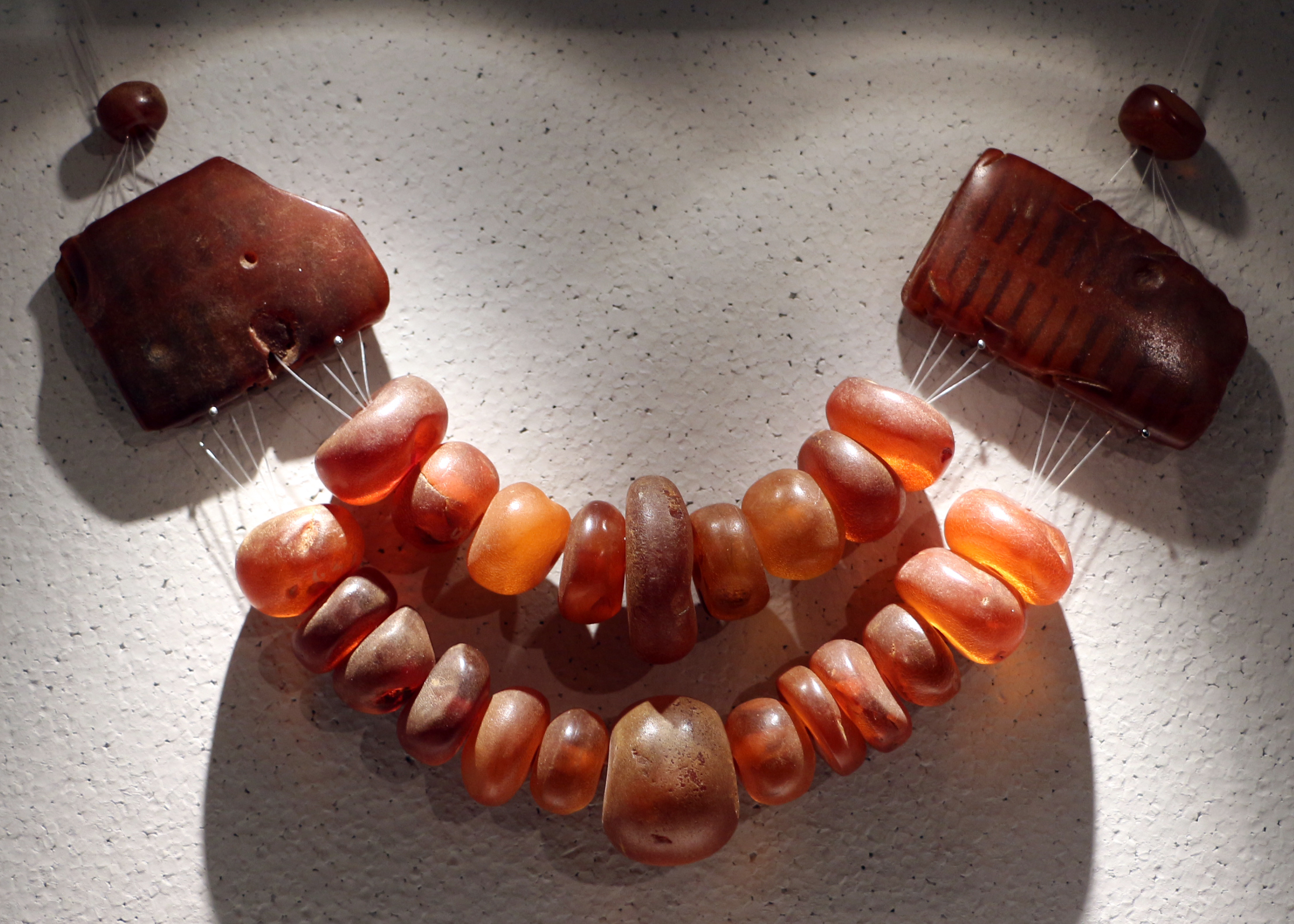
Baltic amber necklace, 16th-15th century BC

== Major sites ==
- Polada (Type-site)
- Alba Via Bubbio (Alessandria)
- Arbedo Castione im Canton Ticino
- Bande di Cavriana Scavo (Mantua)
- Barche di Solferino (Solferino)
- Canàr I (Rovigo)
- Castello Valsoda (Como)
- Castione dei Marchesi (Parma)
- Fiavé 3 (Trento)
- La Quercia di Lazise
- Lago di Ledro
- Lavagnone 4, Lavagnone 3/A und Lavagnone 2/A
- Lucone D
- Palude Brabbia (Varese)
- Remedello Sopra (Brescia)
- Romagnano (Trento)
- Saint-Martin de Corléans (Aosta)
- Savignano (Modena)
- Sorbara di Asola (Mantua)
- Torbole (Brescia)
- Vela di Valbusa (Trento)

== Paleogenetics ==
Male individuals from Trentino in the Bronze Age (Paludei di Volano, Romagnano and Solteri) mainly belonged to Haplogroup G-M201 and G-L497 more specifically, both associated with the Early European Farmers.

== See also ==
- Unetice culture
- Terramare culture
- Prehistoric pile dwellings around the Alps
