= Straubing culture =

Bronze Age archaeological culture in Europe

- Alternative names: Straubingen culture
- Geographical range: Southern Germany
- Period: Bronze Age
- Dates: c. 2150 – 1700/1500 BC
- Preceded by: Bell Beaker culture
- Followed by: Tumulus culture

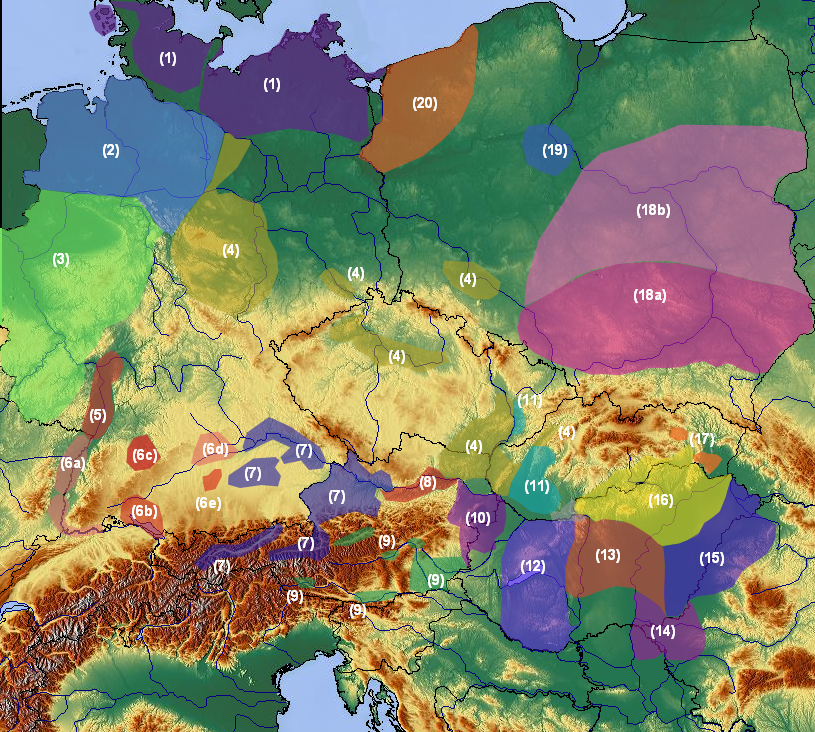
Archaeological cultures in Central Europe at the end of the III millennium and beginning of the II millennium BC. The Straubing Culture is shown in purple (7)

The Straubing culture (or Straubingen culture) is the name for a Bronze Age culture which spread primarily in the territory of modern-day Lower Bavaria and Upper Austria between the 22nd to 16th centuries BC.

The Straubingen culture was part of the Northern Alpine EBA, which is classified as the western-most part of the Danubian EBA which was extended from the Rhine Valley in the west to Upper Austria in the East. It was recognized as an autonomous culture by Karl Schumacher in 1917.

== Characteristics ==
=== Economy ===
The economy was sustained mainly by agriculture and the herding of diverse animal species. Important was also the metallurgic sector.

=== Dwellings ===
Hamlets constituted by one or two long-houses placed west of their graveyards. The houses were made of wood, with a North-South orientation; basically were longhouses composed by one or two naves.

=== Burials ===
The burial practices continued the Bell Beaker Culture rites involving sex-differentiated body positioning in a crouched position as with the orientation of the tomb. Some objects found with buried individuals were bronze daggers, bracelets, and even objects made of amber.

== Genetic profile ==
Y-DNA analysis with enough genetic coverage was obtained from 21 male individuals buried in the Lech valley, five sampled individuals had derived alleles placing them on the lineage spanning R1b-M269 to R1b-L11/P310, but were not covered at P312/S116; 15 sampled males had the subvariant R1b-P312/S116* (with no more derived alleles further downstream called). There was only a male from the I clade. The autosomal composition detected was ~13% Western HG, ~47% Anatolian farmer, ~38% Yamnaya.

== Gallery ==
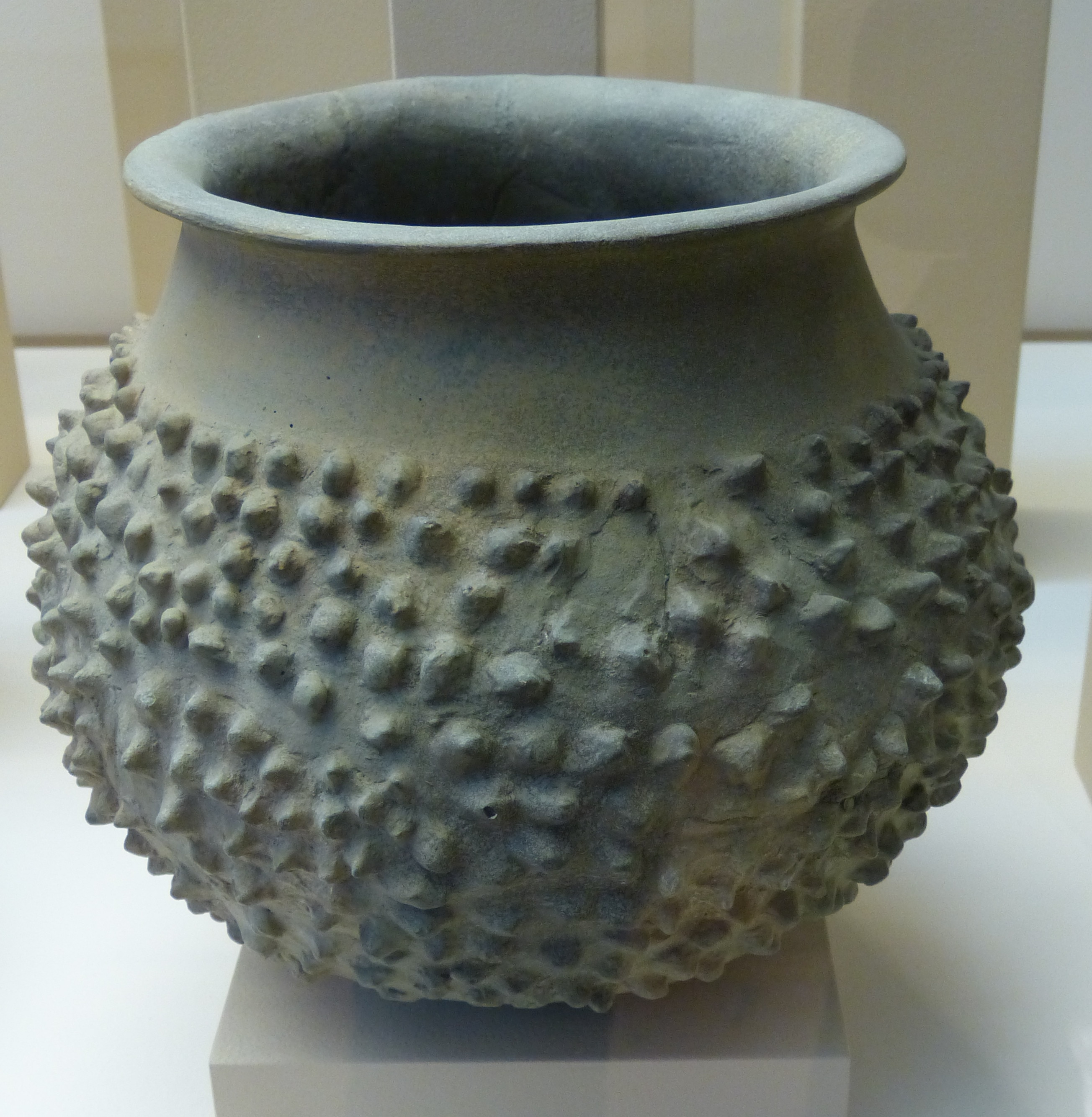

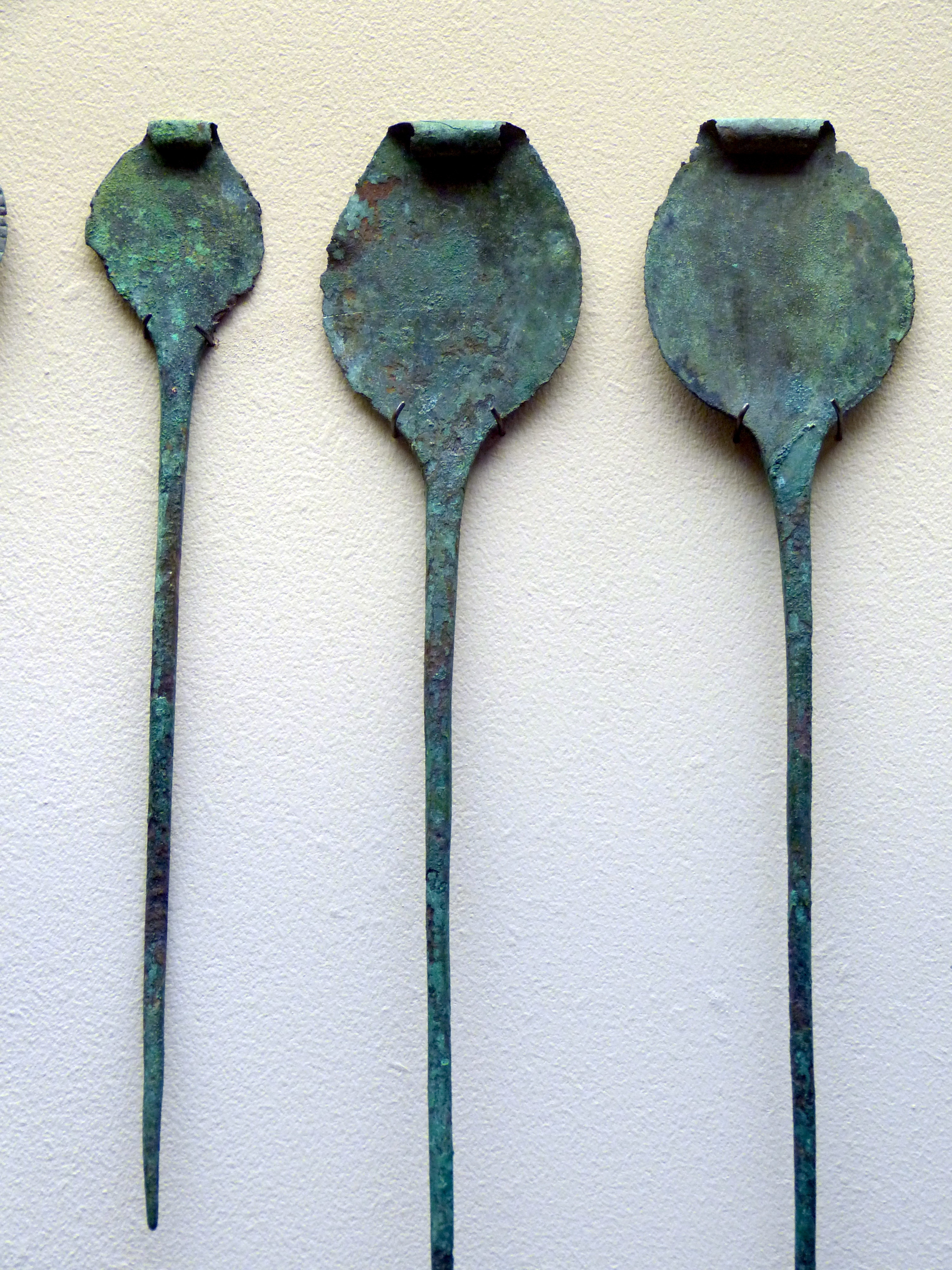

== Bibliography ==
- Gustav Behrens: Straubinger Stufe. In: Max Ebert (Hrsg.): Reallexikon der Vorgeschichte. Band 12: Seedorfer Typus – südliches Afrika. de Gruyter, Berlin 1928, S. 460.
- Hans-Jürgen Hundt: Katalog Straubing. Band 1: Hans-Jürgen Hundt: Die Funde der Glockenbecher-Kultur und der Straubinger Kultur (= Materialhefte zur bayerischen Vorgeschichte. Bd. 11, ZDB-ID 534018-4). Lassleben, Kallmünz/Oberpfalz 1958.
- Birgit Lißner: Zu den frühbronzezeitlichen Gruppen in Süddeutschland. In: Leipziger online-Beiträge zur ur- und frühgescheschichtlichen Archäologie. Bd. 13, 2004, ISSN 1612-4227, S. 69–88, online (PDF; 655 KB).
- Karl H. Rieder: Archäologie um Ingolstadt. Ergebnisse der letzten 3 Jahre. Ausstellung des Landesamtes für Denkmalpflege. 5.–27. November 1983. Historischer Verein, Ingolstadt 1983.
- Angelika Wegener-Hüssen, Gerd Riedel (Red.): Ingolstadt und der oberbayerische Donauraum (= Führer zu archäologischen Denkmälern in Deutschland. Bd. 42). Theiss, Stuttgart 2003, ISBN 3-8062-1716-5.

== See also ==
- Unetice Culture
- Polada culture
