= Facies of the pile dwellings and of the dammed settlements =

- Geographical range: North Italy
- Period: Bronze Age
- Dates: c. 1800-1300 BC
- Preceded by: Polada culture
- Followed by: Proto-Villanovan culture, Luco culture

The facies of the pile dwellings and of the dammed settlements (Italian: facies delle palafitte e degli abitati arginati) is a cultural aspect of the Middle to Late Bronze Age (c. 1800 to 1300 BC) that developed between eastern Lombardy, Trentino and western Veneto, north of the Terramare. It was followed in the Final Bronze Age by the Proto-Villanovan culture and by the Luco culture.

The continuity with the previous Polada culture of the Early Bronze Age seems to be unbroken. The villages, as in the previous phase, are on stilts and they were concentrated in the area of the Lake of Garda. In the plains appeared instead villages with levees and ditches.

The bronze metallurgy (weapons, work tools, etc.) was well developed among these populations. As for the burial customs both cremation and inhumation were praticted. Sometimes the two rites coexisted in the same necropolis, as at "Olmo di Nogara".

Archaeological evidence suggests that the society was probably dominated by a warrior elite.

== Genetics ==
A 2020 study by Kendra Sirak et al. analyzed the ancient DNA of two individuals from the necropolis of Olmo di Nogara, a male and a female, belonging to this culture and dated 1400-1200 BC. The male carried mtDNA haplogroup HV0a while the female carried mtDNA haplogroup H3c.

== Gallery ==
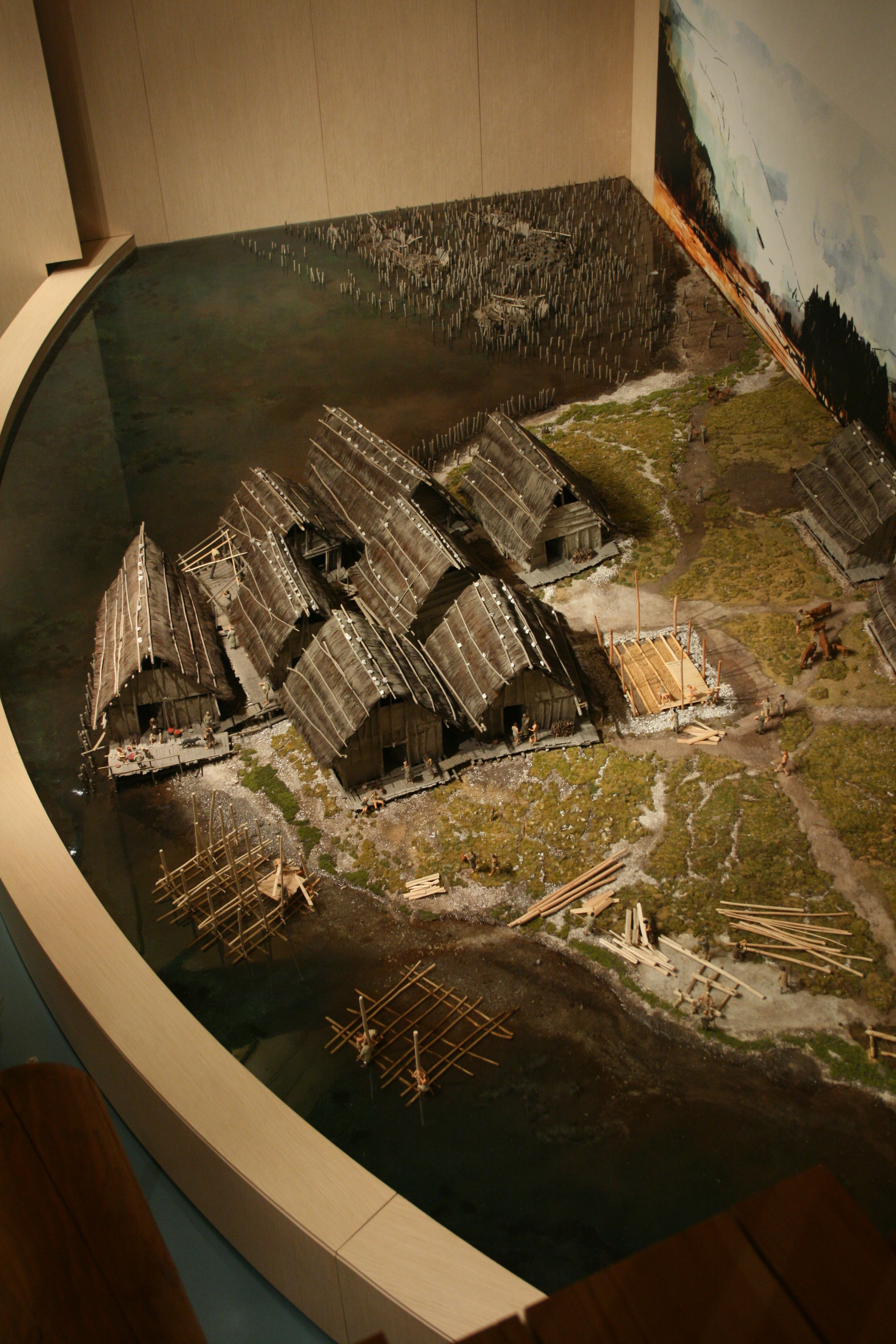
Fiavé 6

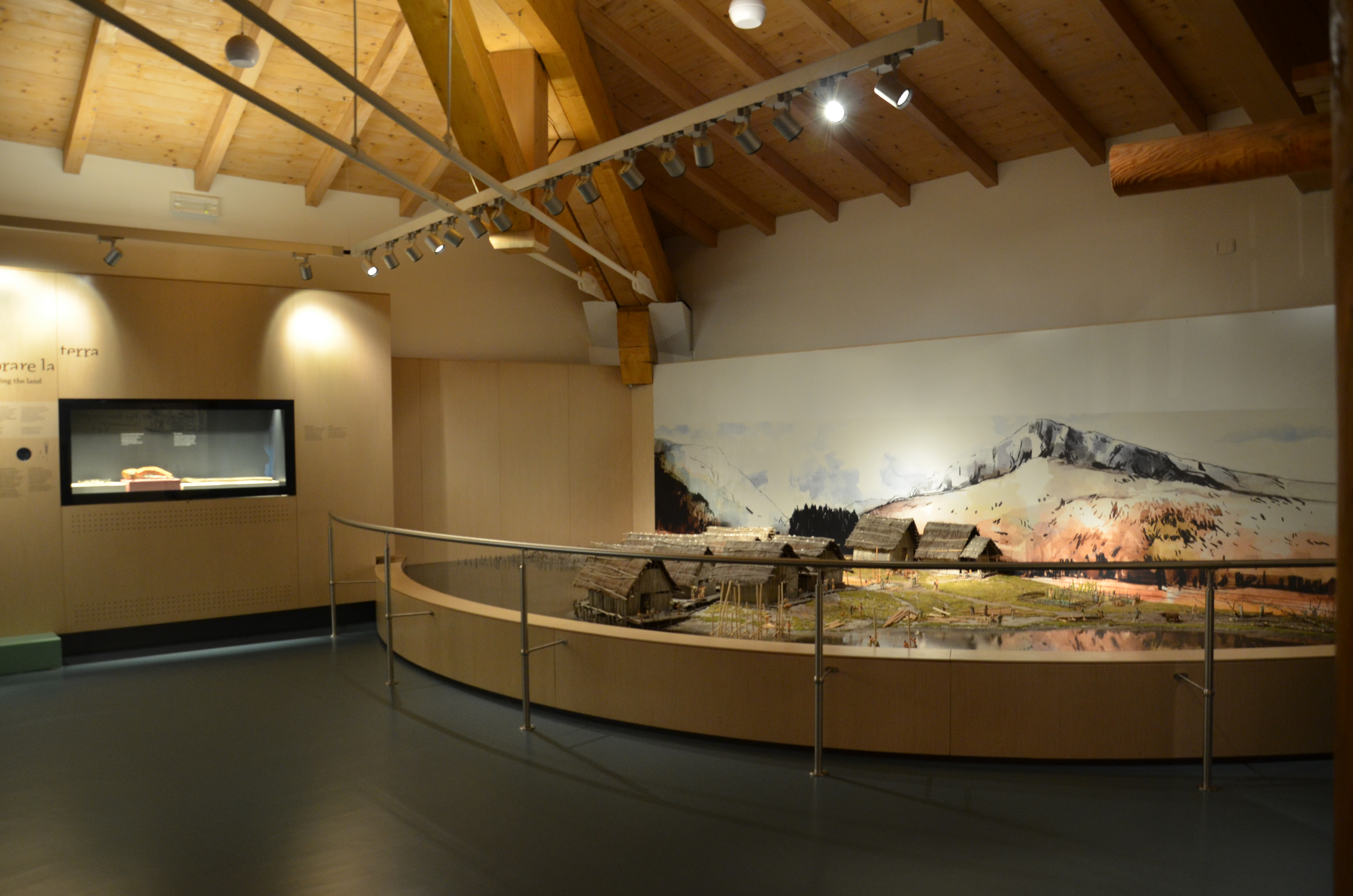
Museum display

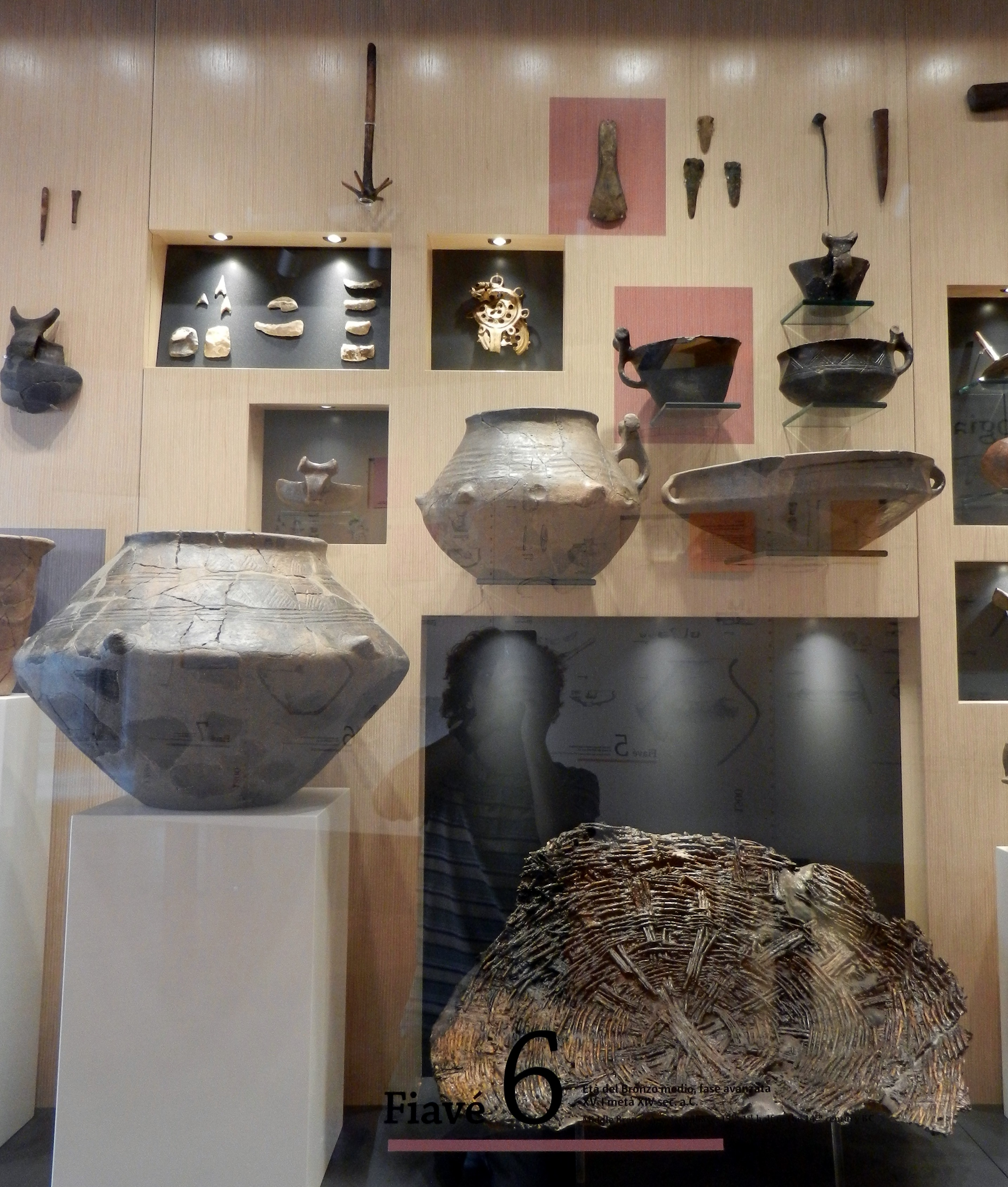

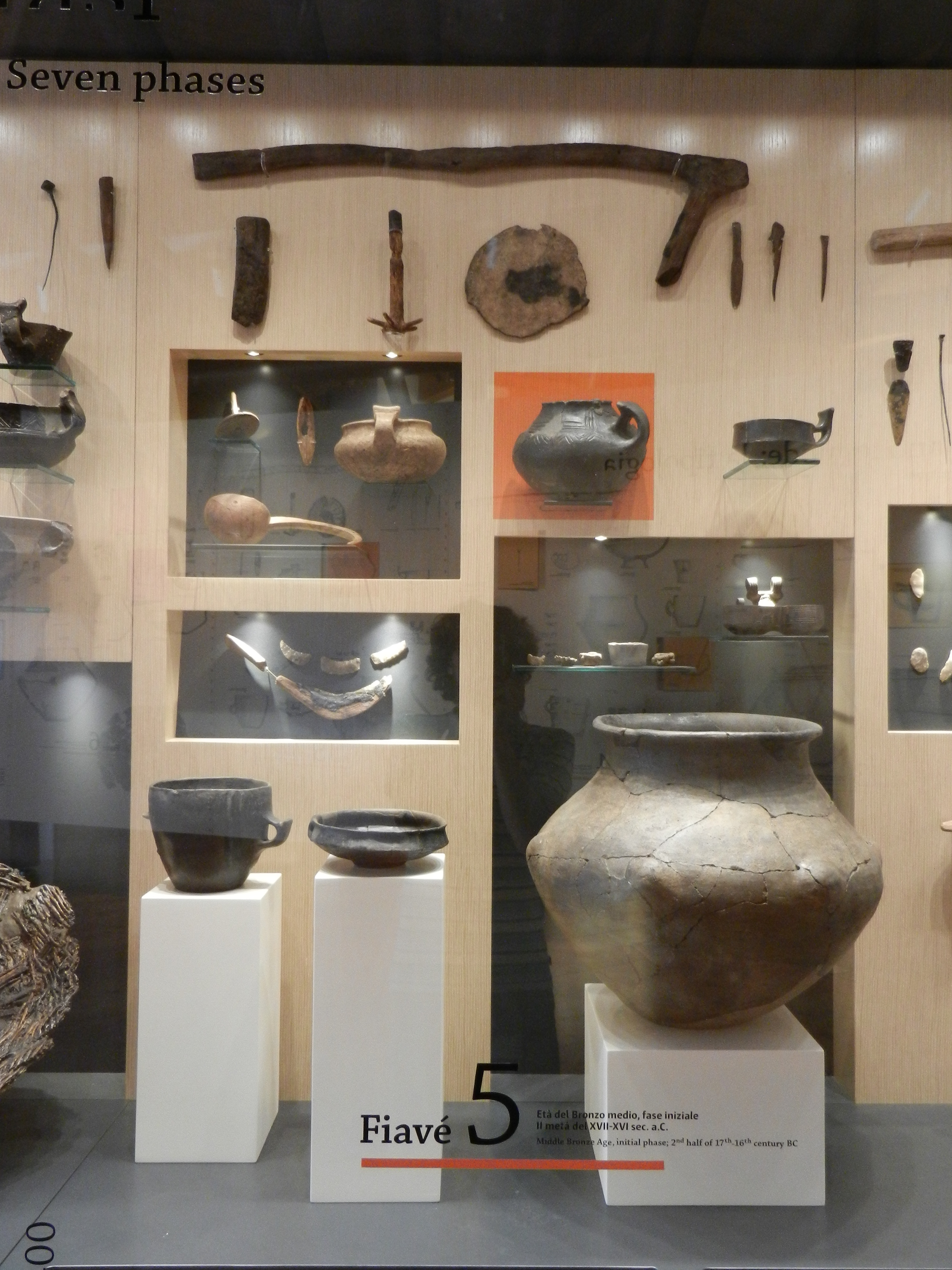

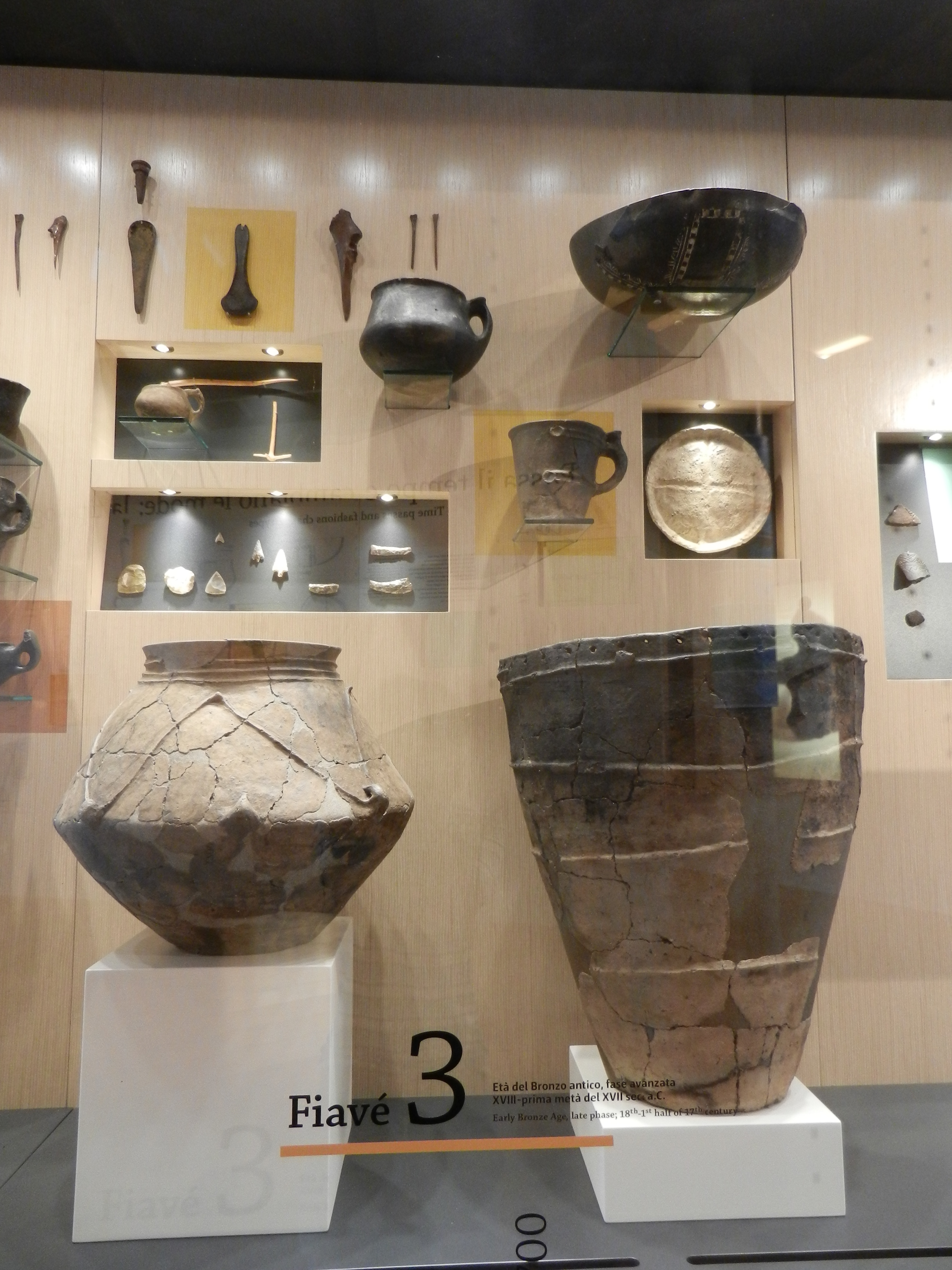

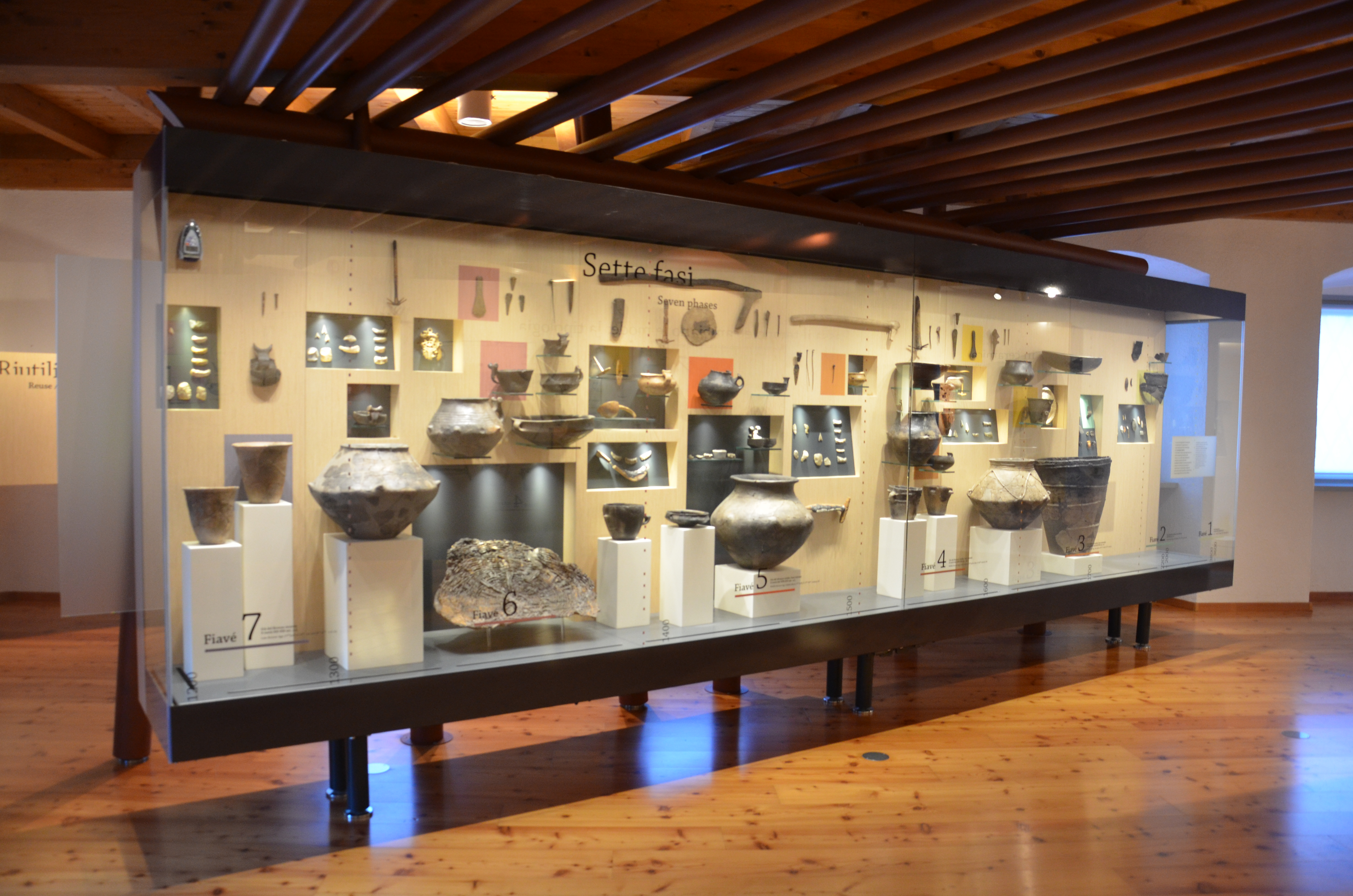

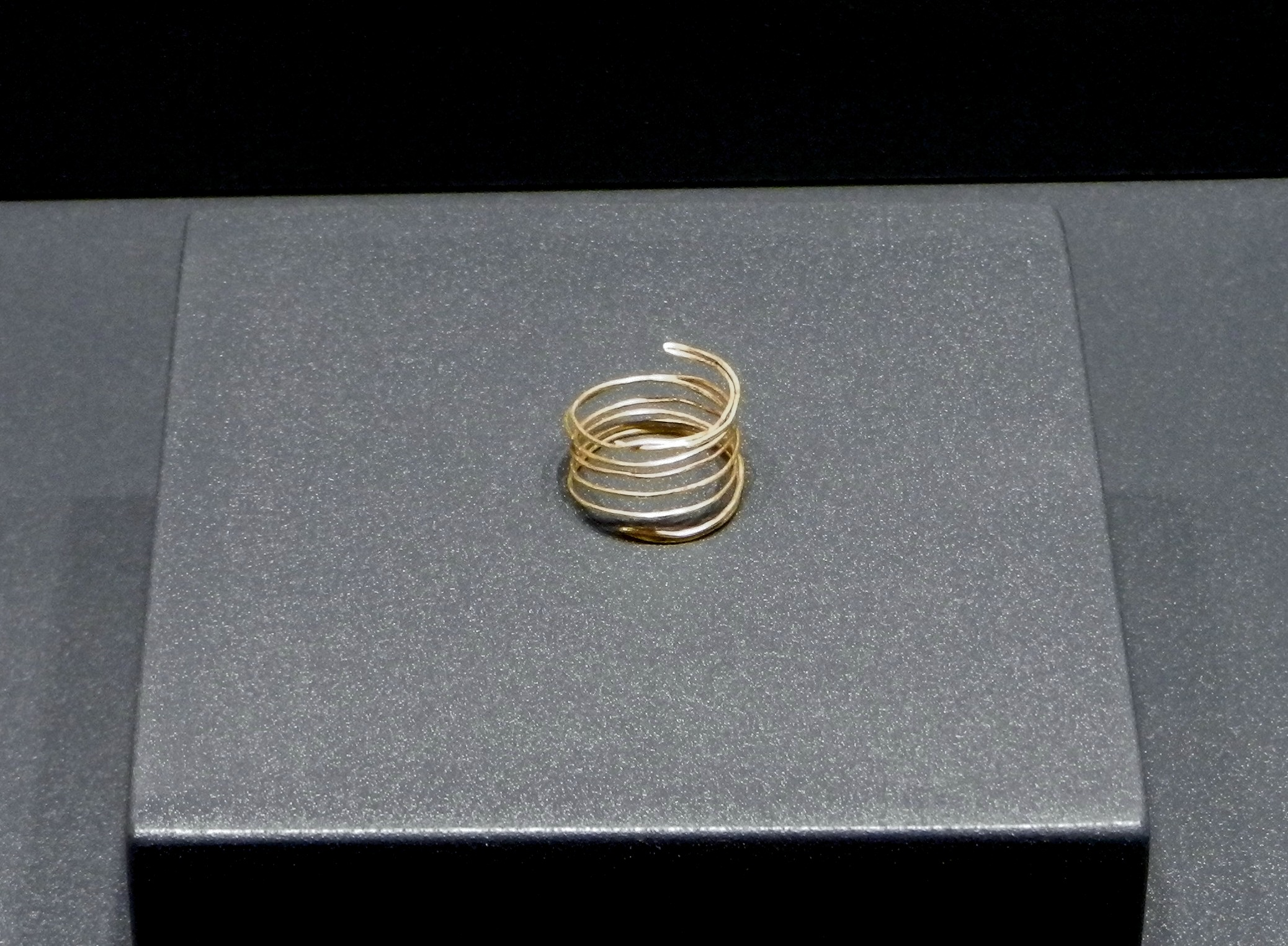
Gold spiral ring

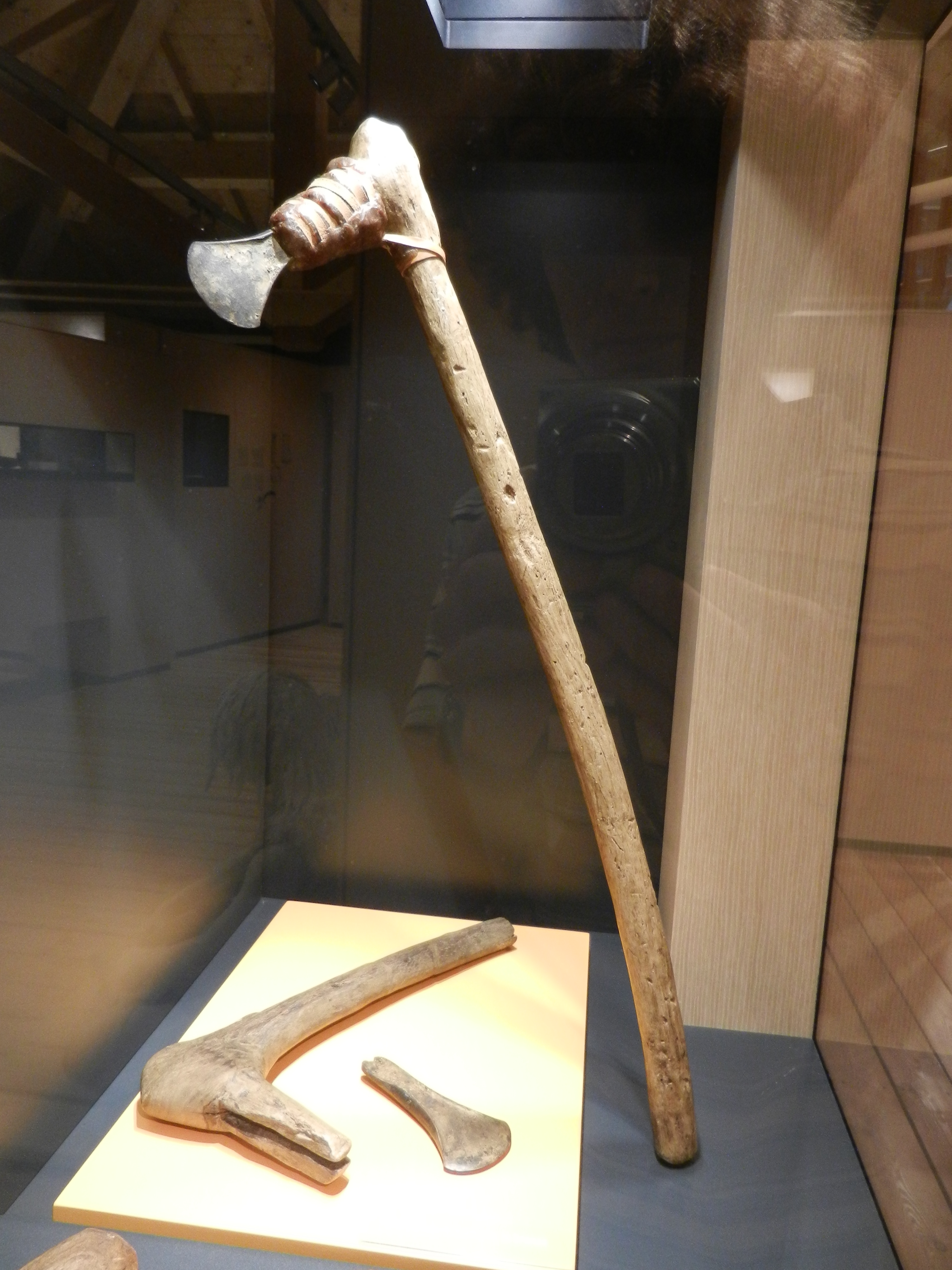
Axe

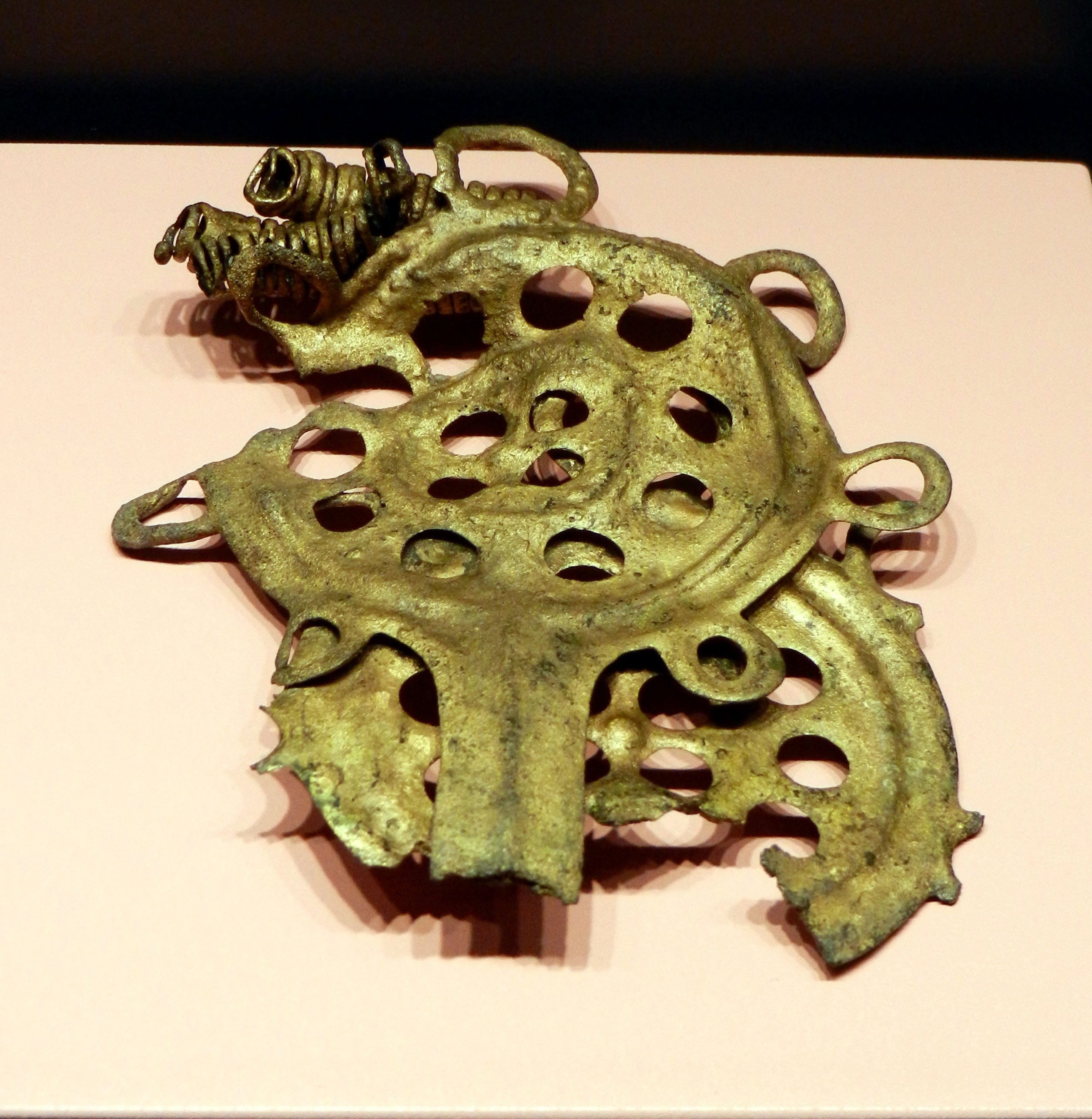
Bronze pins and spirals, welded together by a fire

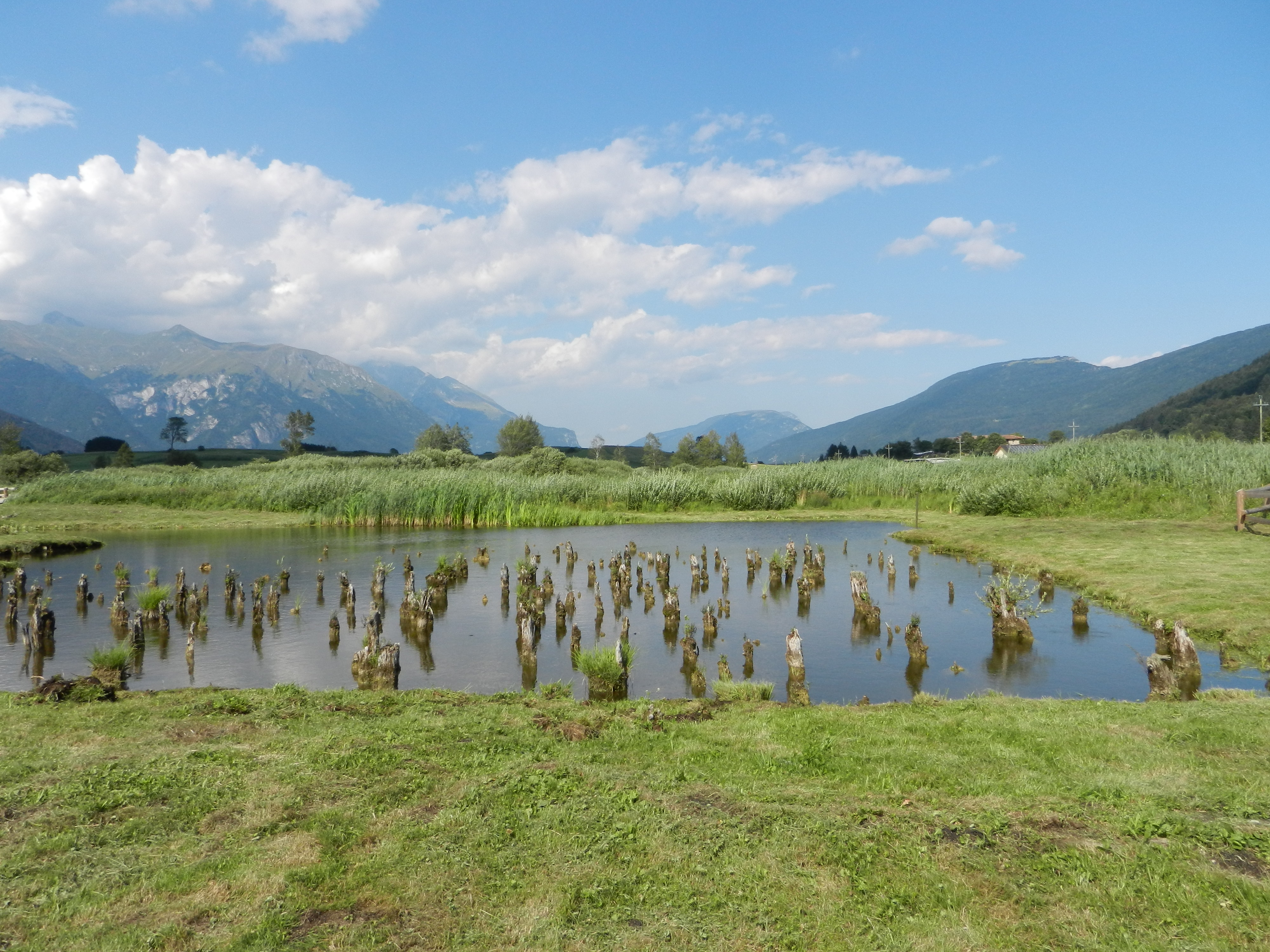
Remains of a pile dwelling

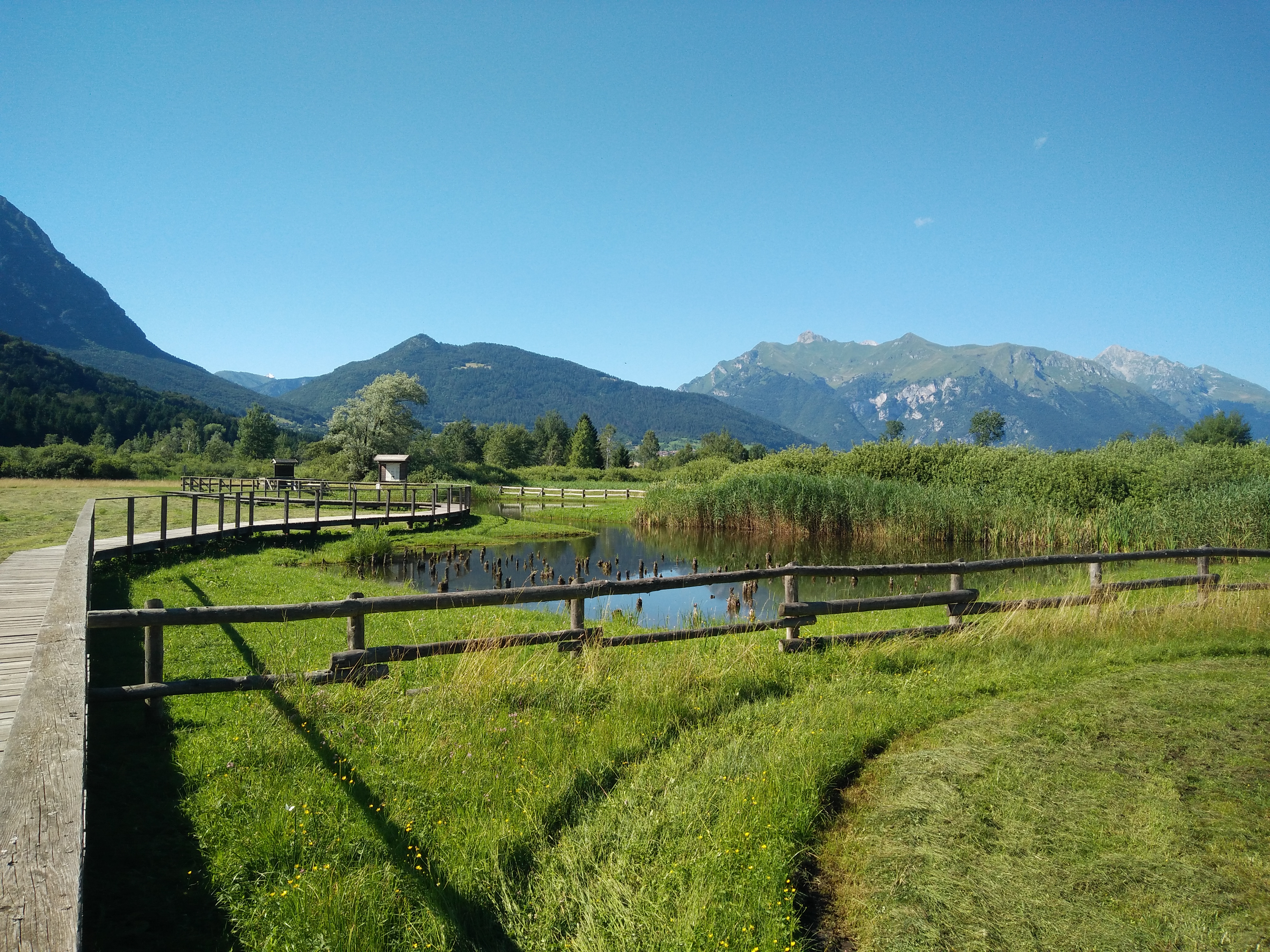

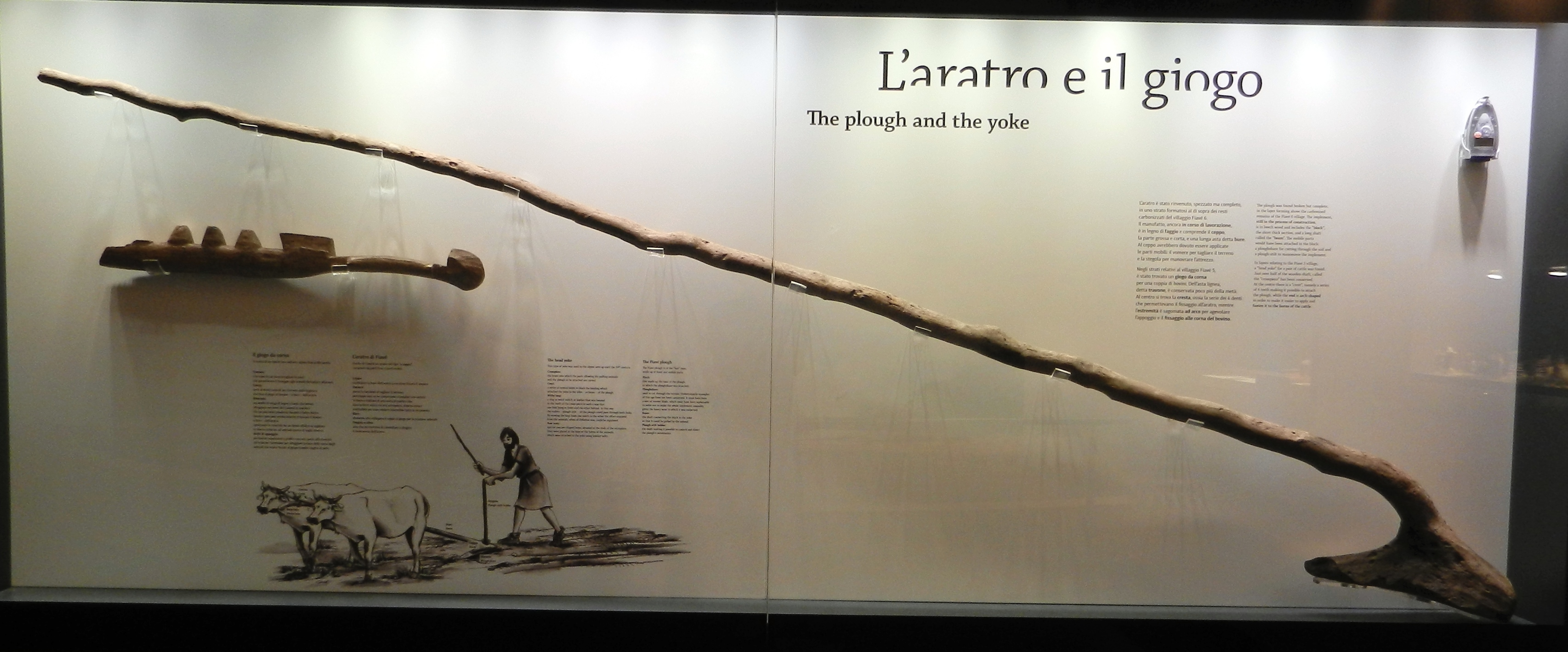
Plow

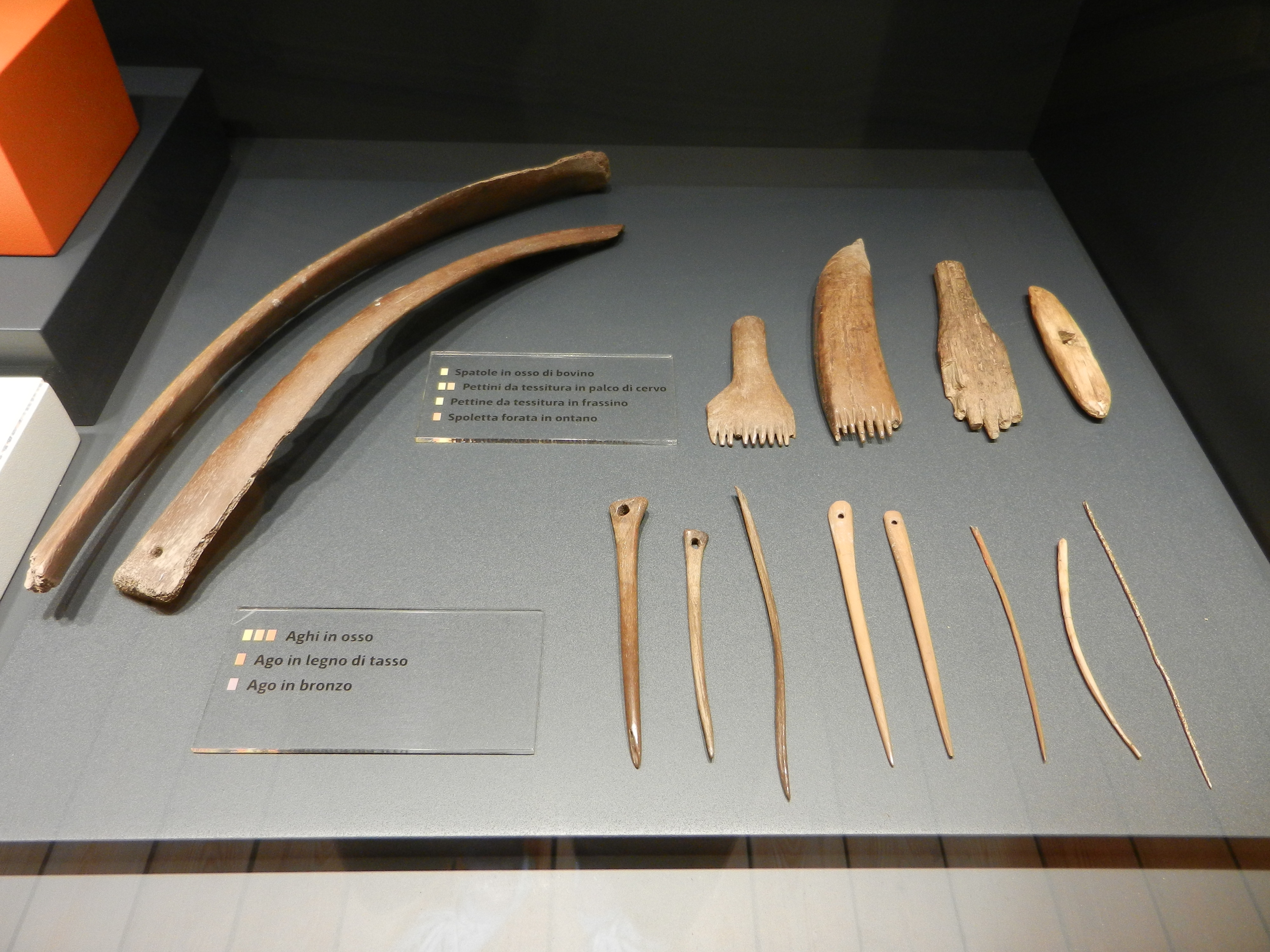

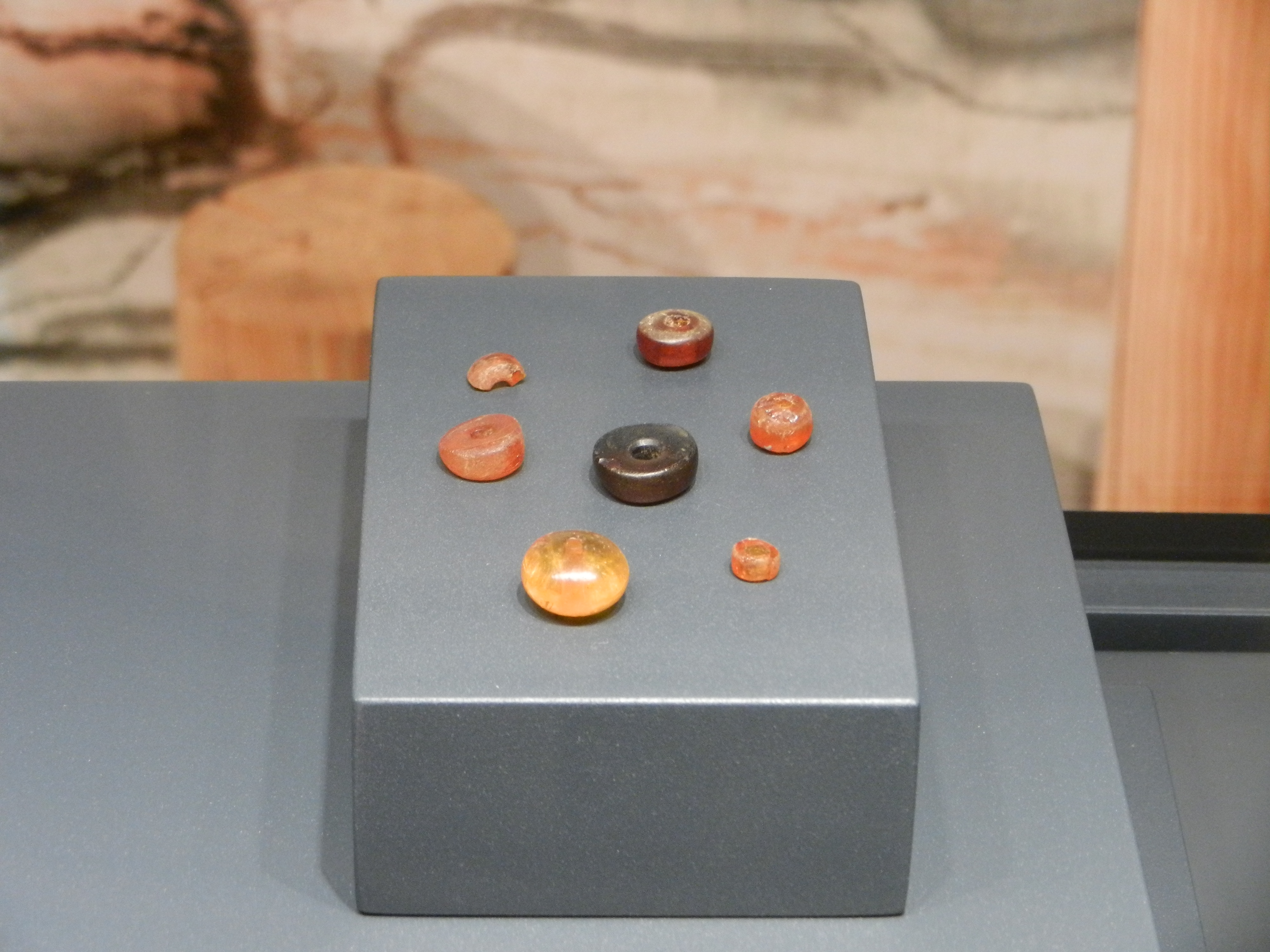

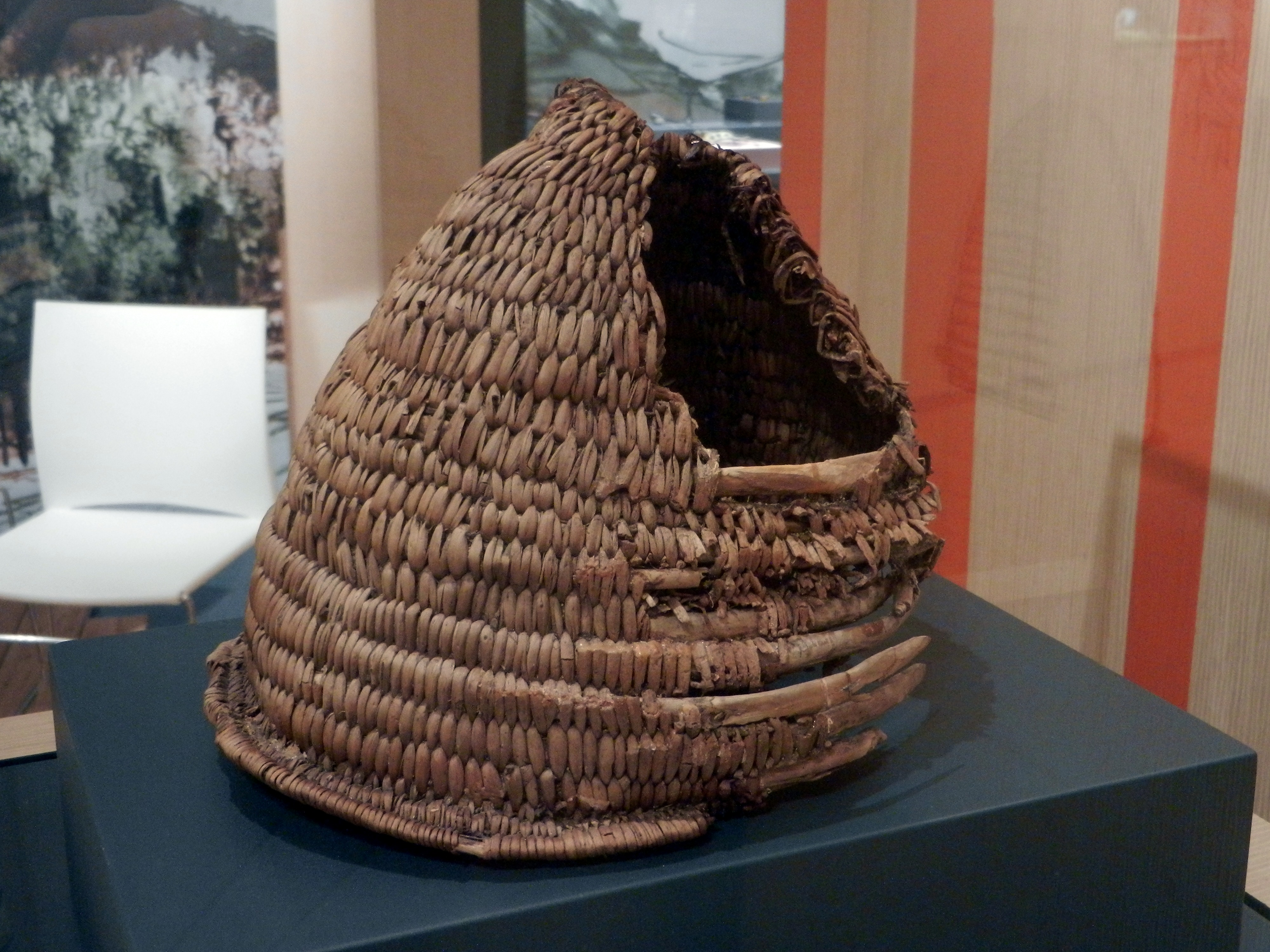

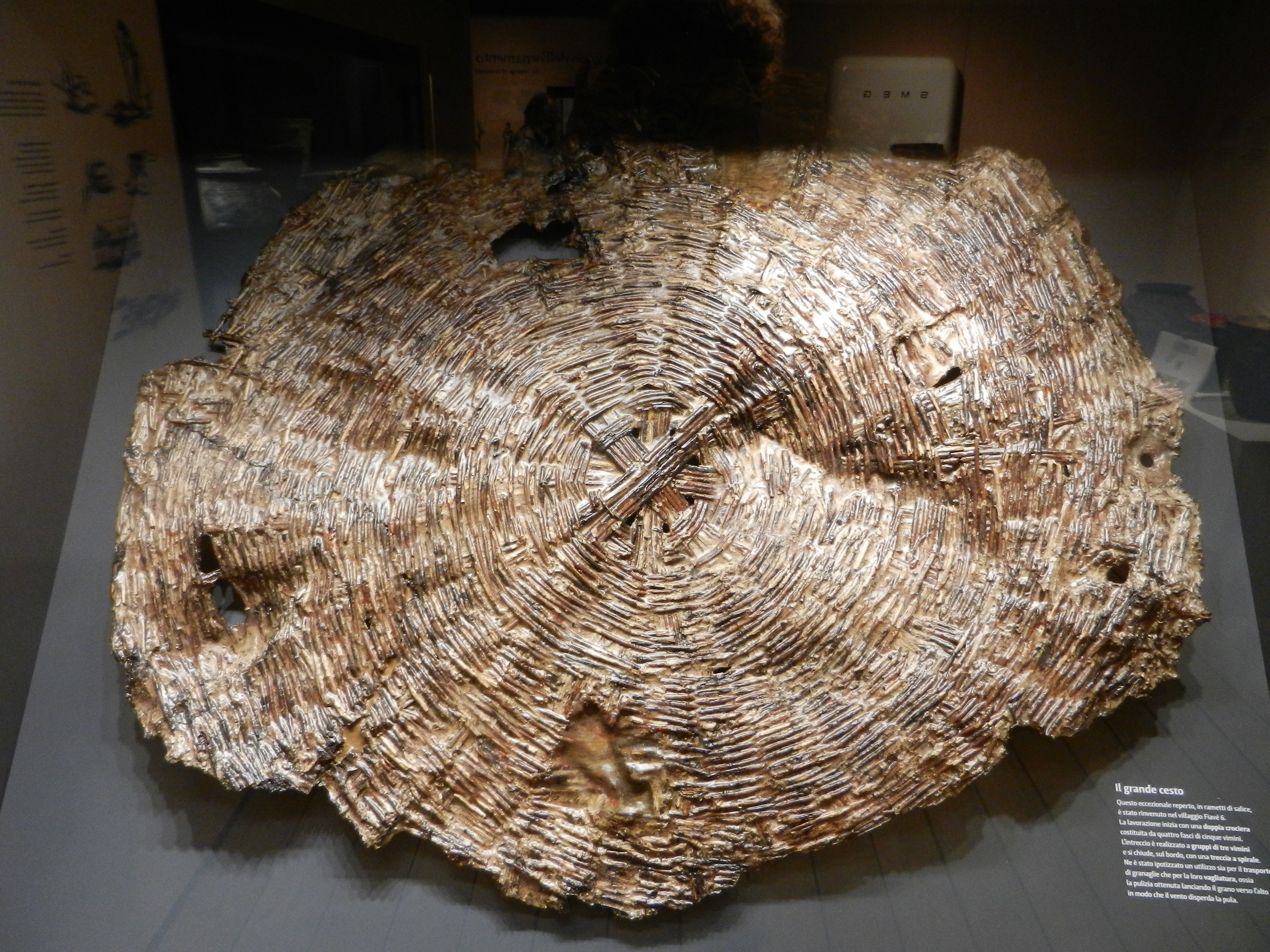

== See also ==
- Prehistoric pile dwellings around the Alps

== Bibliography ==
- Anna Maria Bietti Sestieri, L'Italia nell'età del bronzo e del ferro : dalle palafitte a Romolo (2200-700 a.C.). with CD-ROM. Rome: Carocci. 2010. ISBN 9788843052073.
