= Cetina culture =

Bronze Age culture in Dalmatia

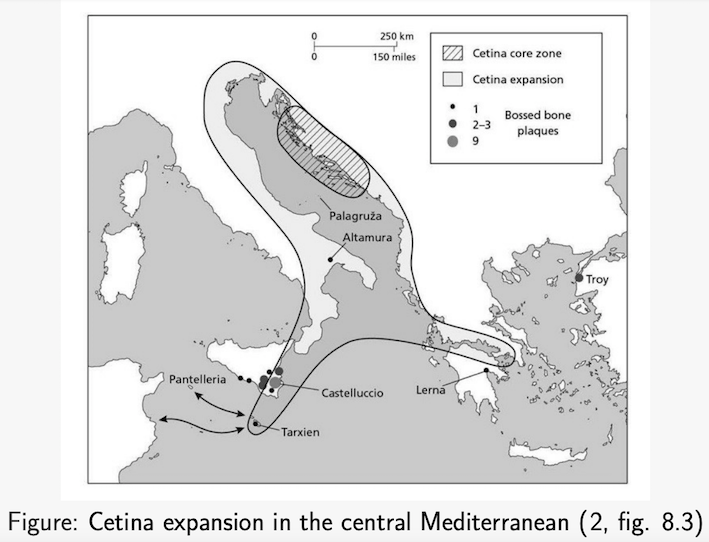
- Geographical range: Western Balkans (core region); Adriatic-Ionian coasts, central Mediterranean Sea (expansion)
- Period: Bronze Age Europe
- Dates: c. 2500 BCE – 1600 BCE
- Major sites: Cetina Valley
- Preceded by: Vučedol culture, Bell Beaker culture
- Followed by: Middle Helladic Greece, Castellieri culture, Glasinac-Mati culture

The Cetina culture is the name for the archaeological culture of the inhabitants of the Middle Dalmatian coast, and especially its hinterland, during the early Bronze Age. It is named after the numerous sites along the Cetina river in Central Dalmatia and Herzegovina. People of this culture were present in caves (Škarin Samograd near Drniš, Gudnja near Ston, Ravlić cave in Drinovci) or in open settlements (Gradac in Kotorac and Krstina near Posušje). The graves are in rocky colonies. In the case of inhumation, they have the shape of a stone chest, while incinerated remains of the deceased are laid in clay pots.

Gori et al. (2021) describe the culture as a widespread pattern of interconnections traceable through a particular ceramic style that spread in the Adriatic-Ionian area in the second half of the 3rd millennium BC. The Cetina culture is materially characterized through the diffusion of specific pottery, burial and ritual mounds (tumuli), grouped in clusters or, more occasionally, isolated. Its diffusion of material evidence reflects the movement of small groups of seafarers and testifies of recurrent contacts.

== Formation ==
The Cetina culture appeared in the western Balkans following the collapse of the Vučedol culture shortly after the middle of the 3rd millennium BC. This collapse may have been attributed to an identified plague outbreak in modern-day Croatia and the concurrent arrival of Yamnaya-steppe migrants. More specifically, Cetina emerged following the "Ljubljana culture", which is described as the Adriatic variant of the Vučedol complex.

In recent years, several scholars have highlighted the syncretic/alternative relationship between the Bell Beaker phenomenon and the Cetina culture. Although it is possible to distinguish between these two broad spheres of cultural influence, their boundaries were permeable, allowing for significant interaction, exchange, and the selective adoption of cultural elements. This likely entailed small-scale population movements, which may have involved specialized craftspeople, traders, and individuals who relocated as part of exogamous marriage networks.

== Archaeological findings ==
Ceramics and funerary findings are the most abundant archaeological sources of the culture.

=== Funeral Customs ===
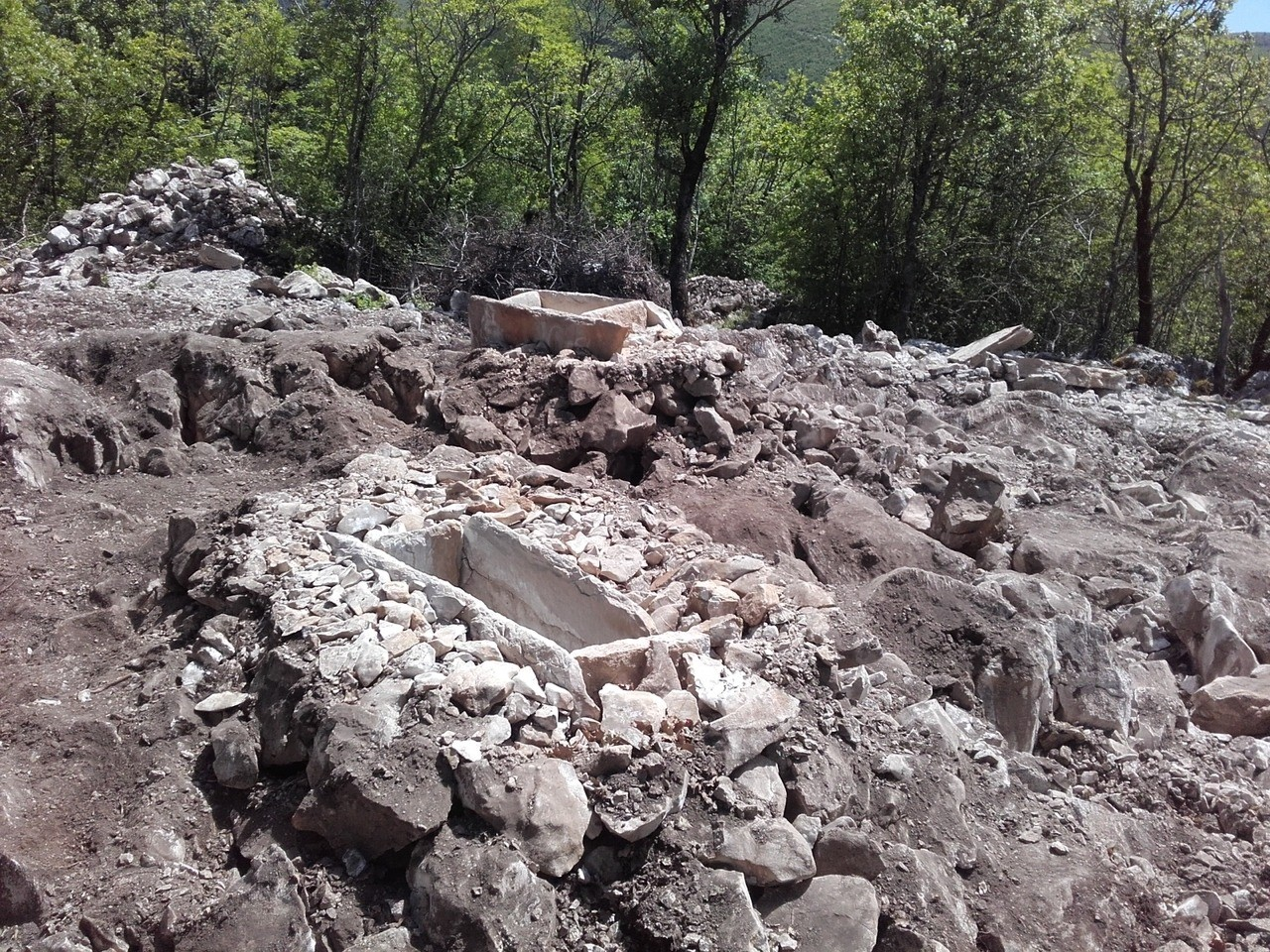
Cetina Culture tumuli stone cist graves

The bearers of the Cetina culture buried their dead in tumuli usually made of large crushed stone, and only exceptionally of small stone or a mixture of stone and earth. The deceased were laid in a crouched position in a stone chest or their cremated remains were stored in a clay urn, most often placed in the center of the tumulus. In both burial methods, fragments of a large number (from two to as many as 67) of ceramic vessels were discovered in the stone layer of the tumulus, and it is possible that these are traces of the ritual breaking of dishes used during the posthumous feast. In addition to exclusively inhumation or cremation necropolises, there are also those where both funeral rites were used. Contributions in graves are very rare, and most often they are bronze weapons or jewelry. The ceramics found in the funerary context are generally of much lower quality than those from the settlement.

The funerary practices of the Cetina culture consisted of inhumations or cremations under stone tumuli. While these mostly occurred as single burials, multiple burials also took place under the same tumulus. These tumuli were frequently grouped together to form clusters.

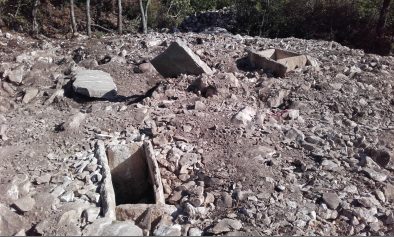
Cetina Culture tumuli stone cist graves

== Structure ==
Strategies for accessing resources and the metal trade are generally considered the main driving forces behind the Cetina expansion. However, Gori et al. (2021) argue that these large-scale explanations fail to investigate the more complex, small-scale aspects and localized interconnectivity. They state that while it has been established that long-distance networks were crucial for the emergence of the Cetina phenomenon, describing the culture as a uniform network focused solely on the metal economy overlooks these smaller-scale interactions along with other important material resources, like the Gargano chert, and social resources, such as ritual activities linked to mobility.

In their 2021 network analysis of a subset of Cetina material, the researchers used a "community of practice" approach to examine the ritual and ideological aspects of the culture. The study applied modularity analysis to reconstruct the Cetina network structure. The authors demonstrated that the broader Adriatic-Ionian network could be divided into smaller interacting sub-networks. These regional clusters maintained localized practices while remaining integrated within the broader culture, and participating in the maritime long-distance exchanges.

=== Settlements ===
Settlements are the least known aspect of Cetina culture. The most significant deposits of Cetina culture were discovered in the Škarin Samograd cave located at the foot of the Mogli brdo, six kilometers northwest of Unešić. The amount of findings collected in other researched settlements, mostly caves, suggests mainly temporary inhabitation. The stratigraphy of Škarin Samograd enabled Ivan Marovic and Borivoj Covic to produce a three-phase periodization of Cetina culture, which is still used.

Open-air settlements associated with the Cetina culture are virtually unknown. Archaeological evidence is limited to a small number of Cetina sherds recovered from Middle and Late Bronze Age hillfort sites. Most settlement data come from caves, such as Škarin Samograd in the Šibenik area. However, the coastal site of Rutigliano-Le Rene, in central Apulia, has been hypothesized to be an open-air settlement.

== Area of diffusion ==
Bell Beaker core/periphery/margin areas during the Early Bronze Age.

The best known clusters of Cetina tumuli are located in the upper course of the Cetina river. However, similar structures have been identified throughout Dalmatia, particularly in its smaller valleys. Caves associated with Cetina have also been documented, including Škarin Samograd in the Šibenik area. Gori et al. (2018) consider the area between Šibenik and Split to be the core of the Cetina culture.

Emergency excavations were carried out at several Cetina culture sites during the construction of the A1 motorway in Croatia. At the site of Matijin dolac in Vučevica, two tumuli were identified. One contained a small number of Cetina pottery sherds, while the other yielded a larger quantity, possibly associated with a cremation. At Jukić, in the Zagvozd area, a Cetina-associated, dry-stone tumulus was found to contain two prehistoric graves. Skeletal remains representing two inhumations were identified in one of the graves, together with a large amount of prehistoric sherds, including two small Cetina jars. At Begovići, an excavated tumulus yielded a cluster of bones and Cetina pottery sherds near its centre, as well as a stone wrist guard. A cluster of tumuli was also investigated at Poljakuše, near Danilo, during the highway construction works.

Archaeological excavations on the island of Palagruža have provided evidence of maritime connections between Apulia and Dalmatia. The islet was inhabited from the 3rd millennium BC and may have served as an overnight shelter for seafarers travelling from Dalmatia towards the Gargano peninsula. The scarcity of freshwater and fuel on the islet has been cited as evidence that the Cetina pottery discovered there was brought from Dalmatia, while the excavated lithics originated from Apulia. Almost all the artefacts recovered from the islet were made of flint derived from Gargano chert. Cetina pottery has also been discovered on the island of Sušac.

Early 3rd millennium BC “princely” tumuli have been identified in southern Dalmatia, including Mala Gruda and Velika Gruda, as well as in Pazhok, in central Albania. A considerable number of finds associated with the Cetina culture have also been discovered around Lake Shkodër in northern Albania. In this context, the cemetery at Shkrel, which includes several tumuli, is notable for its Cetina pottery and the substantial size and architecture of its burial mounds. In Shtoj, the excavated tumulus exhibits two superimposed construction stages. Several violin-shaped idols were recovered from the lower structure, while a Cetina-type vessel was found in the grave associated with the upper structure. Cetina pottery sherds have also been recovered from the hillforts of Shkodër and Gajtan. Excavations in the caves of Blazi, Nezir, and Keputa provide further evidence of the presence of the Cetina culture in central Albania. Cetina-type pottery sherds and a small jug have also been found at Sovjan, in the Lake Ohrid–Lake Prespa region. These latter finds provide evidence of overland connections in the diffusion of Cetina features across the southwestern Balkans.

Finds from Gornji Kotorac demonstrate inland distribution of the Cetina culture into Bosnia and Serbia.

In Italy, Cetina pottery sherds are less numerous but are distributed across a wide area, extending from the Karst region in the northeast to Apulia in the southeast and Campania in the southwest. Additionally, Cetina-like pottery has also been identified in Calabria, eastern Sicily and the Aeolian Islands.. These Cetina-like ceramics in Calabria and eastern Sicily provide evidence for the spread of Cetina-type features in southernmost coastal Tyrrhenian Italy. Furthermore, finds from Campania illustrate that these long-range interactions via seafarers reached possibly both the Adriatic side of the Italian peninsula and the southern Tyrrhenian region from the eastern Adriatic and Ionian regions.

In Apulia, the finds are concentrated in the northern part of the region, including the Gargano promontory and the Tavoliere plain, as well as in inland area of the central and southern part of the region, including Altamura and Laterza. The site of Rutigliano-Le Rene, in central Apulia, lies outside this distribution pattern. In northern Apulia, Cetina-type pottery sherds consist entirely of surface and unstratified finds. These mainly consist of bowls with thickened rims and incised and impressed decorations. In central and southern Apulia, the Cetina-type pottery consist primarily of small jars and jugs. The majority are decorated with incised and impressed patterns on the body, together with incised motifs framing the handles. With the exception of Rutigliano-Le Rene, these vessels derive from funerary contexts associated with local traditions and caves.

The most prominent sites with Cetina pottery in Campania are the inland site of Fosso Aimone, which yielded a thickened-rim bowl and a jar decorated with incised lines, and the site of Oliva Torricella, which yielded a Cetina sherd with an incised and impressed pattern. At the site of Gricignano, north of Naples, a Cetina-type decorated bowl was excavated.

Apart from central Dalmatia, the Peloponnese and Ionian Islands might also have played an active role in these maritime long-range interactions, especially regarding contacts with Sicily, Malta, the Aeolian Islands, and perhaps central-southern Apulia.

According to Heyd (2013) and Maran (1998), Cetina people from the Adriatic region migrated into southern Greece at the transition from Early Helladic II to III, c. 2200 BC. This explains the appearance of Bell Beaker artefacts in mainland Greece, Crete and the Aegean at this time. Kristiansen and Larsson (2005) suggest that migrants from both the Adriatic Cetina culture and the Danube area reached Greece in this period, the latter indicated by close similarities in pottery forms to the Mokrin and Nagyrev cultures. According to the authors there were "movements of groups of traders and some whole communities from east central Europe and the Balkans into Greece and the east Mediterranean at the close of the third millennium BC along already established routes of contact." Galaty et al. (2015) similarly argue that a 'warrior culture' including "ideas related to warrior aristocracy" spread from Europe to Greece through contact with the Cetina culture, along with the tradition of tumulus burial.

=== Cetina culture archaeological sites ===
List of Cetina Culture Sites
Index	Site Name	Region / Country	Comment	Coordinates	Reference
1	Cetina valley	Split-Dalmatia County, Croatia	Cetina core area	43°56′24″N 16°25′30″E	
2	Škarin Samograd	Šibenik-Knin County, Croatia	Cetina pottery	43°48′43″N 16°00′54″E	
3	Brnjica (Gaj)	Šibenik-Knin County, Croatia	Tumuli with Cetina-pottery	43°44′17″N 15°59′20″E	
4	Poljakuše	Zadar County, Croatia	Tumuli with Cetina-pottery	44°06′47″N 15°20′24″E	
5	Vučevica (Matijin dolac)	Split-Dalmatia County, Croatia	Tumuli with Cetina-pottery	43°35′31″N 16°23′17″E	
6	Gusići	Split-Dalmatia County, Croatia		43°40′48″N 16°37′48″E	
7	Jukić	Split-Dalmatia County, Croatia	Tumuli with Cetina-pottery	43°41′28″N 16°36′07″E	
8	Begovići	Split-Dalmatia County, Croatia	Tumuli with Cetina-pottery	43°33′00″N 16°43′48″E	
9	Sušac	Dubrovnik-Neretva County, Croatia	Cetina-pottery with obsidian	42°45′58″N 16°30′58″E	
10	Palagruža	Dubrovnik-Neretva County, Croatia	Cetina-pottery and Garnero sherds	42°23′31″N 16°15′25″E	
11	Monkodonja	Istria County, Croatia	Cetina-pottery	45°04′16″N 13°41′42″E	
12	Mala Gruda & Velika Gruda	Kotor Municipality, Montenegro	Tumuli with Cetina-pottery	42°19′55″N 18°39′54″E	
13	Shkrel	Shkodër County, Albania	Tumuli with Cetina-pottery	42°20′31″N 19°38′17″E	
14	Shtoj	Shkodër County, Albania	Tumuli with Cetina-pottery	42°09′18″N 19°28′01″E	
15	Gajtan	Shkodër County, Albania	Cetina-like pottery	42°05′17″N 19°34′16″E	
16	Shkodër	Shkodër County, Albania		42°04′01″N 19°30′43″E	
17	Nezir	Dibër County, Albania		41°39′58″N 19°49′44″E	
18	Blazi cave	Dibër County, Albania	Cetina-pottery	41°42′36″N 19°55′12″E	
19	Pazhok	Elbasan County, Albania	Tumulus	40°53′53″N 20°08′28″E	
20	Sovjan	Korçë County, Albania	Cetina-like pottery	40°39′18″N 20°43′52″E	
21	Bela Crkva	Mačva District, Serbia		44°23′39″N 19°28′52″E	
22	Belotić Šumar	Mačva District, Serbia		44°22′55″N 19°31′26″E	
23	Kotorac	Sarajevo Canton, Bosnia Herzegovina	Cetina-pottery	43°48′58″N 18°20′42″E	
24	Rodi Garganico	Apulia, Southern Italy	Cetina-like pottery	41°55′44″N 15°57′22″E	
25	Pedegarganica (12 km)	Apulia, Southern Italy	Cetina-pottery	41°44′42″N 15°32′42″E	
26	Chiantinelle - Serracapriola	Apulia, Southern Italy	cetina-pottery	41°48′29″N 15°06′50″E	
27	Carlantino	Apulia, Southern Italy		41°35′38″N 14°57′25″E	
28	Coppa Nevigata	Apulia, Southern Italy	Cetina-like pottery	41°32′31″N 15°56′17″E	
29	Fontanarosa	Apulia, Southern Italy		41°25′41″N 15°29′06″E	
30	Gaudello	Campania, Southern Italy		40°58′12″N 14°17′17″E	
31	Gricignano di Aversa	Campania, Southern Italy		40°58′37″N 14°14′31″E	
32	Oliva Torricella	Campania, Southern Italy		40°36′43″N 14°58′52″E	
33	Atena Lucana	Campania, Southern Italy		40°27′25″N 15°33′22″E	
34	Rutigliano	Apulia, Southern Italy		40°54′04″N 17°00′18″E	
35	Altamura	Apulia, Southern Italy		40°49′08″N 16°33′14″E	
36	Laterza	Apulia, Southern Italy		40°37′41″N 16°48′14″E	
37	Acijev Spodmol	Municipality of Hrpelje-Kozina, Slovenia	Cetina pottery	45°34′29″N 13°54′25″E	
38	Alihodže	Central Bosnia Canton, Bosnia and Herzegovina	Cetina-like pottery	44°12′29″N 17°41′49″E	
39	Andravida-Lechaina	Peloponnese, Greece	Cetina pottery	37°54′21″N 21°16′09″E	
40	Anište	Moravica District, Serbia	Tumulus and Cetina-like pottery	44°00′14″N 16°13′59″E	
41	Bajagić	Split-Dalmatia County, Croatia	Tumulus and Cetina pottery	43°45′58″N 16°39′40″E	
42	Balajića gomila	Split-Dalmatia County, Croatia	Tumulus and Cetina pottery	43°45′14″N 16°38′02″E	
43	Bašćina	Split-Dalmatia County, Croatia	Cetina-like pottery	43°30′43″N 17°30′36″E	
44	Biskupija	Šibenik-Knin County, Croatia		43°45′00″N 16°37′12″E	
45	Bubnjavača	Šibenik-Knin County, Croatia		44°01′19″N 16°00′40″E	
46	Casal Sabini	Italy	Cetina-like pottery	40°57′40″N 14°31′44″E	
47	Kovačina	Montenegro	Cetina-like pottery	43°07′30″N 19°07′12″E	
48	Fonti S. Callisto-Popoli	Abruzzo, Italy	Cetina-like pottery	42°10′19″N 13°49′44″E	
49	Grapčeva spilja	Hvar Island, Croatia	Cetina-like pottery	43°10′19″N 13°49′44″E	
50	Gomile više lada	Montenegro		42°24′40″N 18°42′43″E	
51	Borci	Bosnia and Herzegovina		43°33′11″N 18°01′52″E	
52	Efendići	Croatia		43°06′29″N 18°06′43″E	
53	Grotta Caterina	Trieste Karst, Italy		45°42′43″N 13°45′14″E	
54	Grotta Cotariova	Trieste Karst, Italy		45°42′54″N 13°45′04″E	
55	Grotta degli Zingari	Trieste Karst, Italy		45°43′05″N 13°44′53″E	
56	Grotta dei Ciclami	Trieste Karst, Italy		45°42′36″N 13°45′29″E	
57	Grotta della tartaruga	Trieste Karst, Italy		45°42′40″N 13°45′18″E	
58	Grotta delle Gallerie	Trieste Karst, Italy		45°42′47″N 13°45′11″E	
59	Grotta del Mitreo	Trieste Karst, Italy		45°42′50″N 13°45′22″E	
60	Kopačina	Brač Island, Croatia	Cetina-like pottery	43°18′47″N 16°32′28″E	
61	Ferizovići	Bosnia and Herzegovina		43°50′02″N 18°54′36″E	
62	Gudnja	Croatia		42°50′31″N 17°39′11″E	
63	Hateljska pećina	Bosnia and Herzegovina		43°06′29″N 18°06′43″E	
64	Grabovica	Bosnia and Herzegovina	Cetina-like pottery	43°38′31″N 17°03′54″E	
65	Krstina	Bosnia and Herzegovina	Cetina-like pottery	43°28′05″N 17°20′24″E	
66	Korakou	Greece	Cetina-like pottery	37°57′14″N 22°55′55″E	
67	Teichos Dymaion	Achaea, Peloponnese, Greece		38°09′24″N 21°24′12″E	

== Chronology ==
The historical scarcity of radiocarbon data made it difficult to identify the chronology of the Cetina phenomenon. Alberto Cazella and Giulia Recchia (2017) suggested that the phenomenon happened in two distinctive phases, one starting in 2500 BCE, and another in 2250 BCE. This hypothesis is supported by phase sequences documented outside Dalmatia that yield Cetina-type and Early Helladic III pottery, notably in Malta and Olympia. Gori et al. (2021) define the start of the culture in the second half of the 3rd millennium BCE (c. 2500 BCE).

Paul Reineck (2000) defined the chronology of the culture between c. 2200–1500 BCE.

The distinctive distribution of Cetina pottery in Apulia has been linked to these two chronological stages. In the first phase, small groups from Dalmatia probably reached the Gargano promontory and the Tavoliere. In the second phase, maritime connections expanded between Dalmatia, western Greece, and central-southern Apulia. This hypothesis is supported by close similarities in decorative patterns between Rutigliano-Le Rene and Olympia, as well as the occurrence of thickened-rim bowls at Olympia.

A charcoal sample from one grave of the Jukić tumulus produced a C14 date of 3590±40 BP, while another charcoal sample from a different grave within the same tumulus yielded a date of 3830±60 BP. In the tumulus of Begovići, a human dental sample from the site produced a C14 date of 3670±40 BP. Gori et al. (2018) argued that the fact that both sites provided radiocarbon dates falling between 2130–1880 BC is consistent with this chronological proposal.

The Campanian site at Fosso Aimone provided a C14 date of 3868±75 BP. Although potentially affected by 'old wood' bias, this date suggests that Cetina-type features penetrated the western Apennines during an early phase of the culture. The Palma Campania site of Oliva Torricella was originally located on the coast and appears to have been destroyed by a tsunami. This site provided two radiocarbon dates from bone samples, 3727±32 BP and 3538±103 BP, both belonging to the tsunami event, which is thus likely to have occurred between the 22nd and 21st centuries BCE. These dates are consistent with the second phase of the Cetina phenomenon.

== People and Language ==
According to Joachim Matzinger (2025), within the broader context of the Messapian language, the most probable origin of the Messapians is from the Balkan territory of the eastern Adriatic. This scenario is supported with archaeological data from the Post-Cetina horizon, between 1700–1400 BCE. Matzinger connects the Proto-Messapian migrations with this trans-Adriatic interaction network connecting central Dalmatia and the Gargano region. While the Proto-Messapians can be identified on the Italic side of this network, Matzinger notes that how the language then spread throughout prehistoric Apulia, and which pre-Indo-European linguistic entity previously existing in this area was subsequently displaced or assimilated, remains unknown.

== Genetics ==
The Mathieson et al. (2018) archaeogenetic study included two Early to Middle Bronze Age samples (1631-1521/1618-1513 calBCE) from Veliki Vanik, Dalmatia, Croatia (near Vrgorac). According to autosomal admixture analysis they had approximately 60% Early European Farmers, 33% Western Steppe Herders and 7% Western Hunter-Gatherer-related ancestry. The male individual from Veliki Vanik carried the Y-DNA haplogroup J2b2a1a1a1b2-Z38240 while his and the female's mtDNA haplogroup were I1a1, W3a1 respectively. Freilich et al. (2021) identify the Veliki Vanik samples as related to Cetina culture. They carry similar ancestry to a Copper Age sample from the site of Beli Manastir-Popova Zemlja (late Vučedol culture), eastern Croatia.

Systematic archaeological excavation of numerous prehistoric sites located around the source of the Cetina river were conducted between 1953 and 1968. All presented graves/skeletons are dated to the Early Bronze Age, i.e. the Cetina culture (ca 2200-1600 BCE). During the campaign carried out at the Rudine site in 1958 stone barrows 19 (T-19) and 21 (T-21) were completely excavated (among several others). T-19 was oval-shaped with a diameter of 17.1 m reaching in height up to 2.4 m. It contained four burials: three in graves and one in the stone deposit. Numerous pottery fragments were found in and around the barrow suggesting 116 some kind of ritual feasts. T-21 was also oval-shaped with a diameter of 13.6 m reaching in height up to 1.2 m. The tumulus contained a central grave in the shape of a stone chest. Nine stone barrows were completely excavated during the campaign conducted at the Preočani site including the Luića gomila or barrow 93 (T-93). This is an oval-shaped stone barrow with a diameter of 12.5 m reaching in height up to 1.1 m. The barrow contained one grave in the shape of a stone chest covered with a large square stone slab. The grave contained the remains of two individuals lying in crouched position with some bones belonging to the third individual moved out of the grave (primary skeleton). Three pottery fragments were found inside the grave. Lazaridis et al. (2022) examined these 18 samples from the Bronze Age Cetina Valley. Out of 10 males whose Y-DNA was successfully extracted, 9 belonged to haplogroup J2b (mainly J-L283 subclades) and 1 to haplogroup R-Z2118. The mtDNA haplogroups consisted of 2x H, H13a2a, H5, H6a1, 3x H6a1a, HV0e, 6x J1c1, N1a1a1, T1a1 and U5a1a.

=== Cetina Culture Archaeogenetic Samples ===
Sample ID	Age (BCE)	Site Location	Sex	Y-DNA (ISOGG)	Y-DNA (Yfull)	mtDNA (Yfull)
I4331	1631-1521 BCE	Veliki Vanik, Croatia	Male	J2b2a1a1a1b2~	J-Z38240	I1a1
I4332	1618-1513 BCE	Veliki Vanik, Croatia	Female	n/a (female)	n/a (female)	W3a1
I11843	2000-1600 BCE	Cetina Valley, Croatia	Male	J2b2a1a1a~	J-Z597	T1a1
I18088	2000-1600 BCE	Rudine, Cetina Valley, Croatia	Male	J2b2a1	J-L283	H5
I18745	2000-1600 BCE	Preočani, Cetina Valley, Croatia	Female	n/a (female)	n/a (female)	HV0e
I18746	2000-1600 BCE	Rudine, Cetina Valley, Croatia	Male	J2b2a1a1a1b2c~	J-Z38241	N1a1a1
I18747	2000-1600 BCE	Rudine, Cetina Valley, Croatia	Male	J2b2a1a1a1b~	J-Y15058	U5a1a
I18752	2000-1600 BCE	Preočani, Cetina Valley, Croatia	Male	R1b1a1b1a2	R-Z2118	H13a2a
I19016	2000-1600 BCE	Cetina Valley, Croatia	Female	n/a (female)	n/a (female)	H6a1
I19017	2000-1600 BCE	Cetina Valley, Croatia	Female	n/a (female)	n/a (female)	H6a1a
I19019	2000-1600 BCE	Cetina Valley, Croatia	Female	n/a (female)	n/a (female)	H6a1a
I19020	2000-1600 BCE	Cetina Valley, Croatia	Female	n/a (female)	n/a (female)	H6a1a
I19022	2000-1600 BCE	Cetina Valley, Croatia	Female	n/a (female)	n/a (female)	H
I19025	2000-1600 BCE	Cetina Valley, Croatia	Male	J2b2a1	J-L283	J1c1
I19026	2000-1600 BCE	Cetina Valley, Croatia	Male	J2b	J-M102	J1c1
I19027	2000-1600 BCE	Cetina Valley, Croatia	Female	n/a (female)	n/a (female)	H
I19029	2000-1600 BCE	Cetina Valley, Croatia	Male	J2b2a1a~	J-Z600	J1c1
I19030	2000-1600 BCE	Cetina Valley, Croatia	Male	n/a (low coverage)	n/a (low coverage)	J1c1
I19031	2000-1600 BCE	Cetina Valley, Croatia	Male	J2b	J-M102	J1c1
I19032	2000-1600 BCE	Cetina Valley, Croatia	Male	J2b2a1a1a1b~	J-Y15058	J1c1

== See also ==
- Illyrians

== Bibliography ==
- Borivoj Čović: Od Butmira do Ilira, Sarajevo, 1976.
- Stašo Forenbaher - Timonthy Kaiser: Palagruža, jadranski moreplovci i njihova kamena industrija na prijelazu iz bakrenog u brončano doba, Opuscula archaeologica, 21, Zagreb, 1997, 15–28 https://hrcak.srce.hr/en/5438
- Blagoje Govedarica, Rano bronzano doba na području istočnog Jadrana, Sarajevo, 1989.
- Blagoje Govedarica: Keramika cetinskog tipa u unutrašnjosti zapadnog Balkana i problem kulturno-istorijske interpretacije praistorijskih nalaza, Godišnjak Centra za balkanološka ispitivanja Akademije nauka i umjetnosti Bosne i Hercegovine, 35, Sarajevo, 2006., str. 95-114
- Nives Majnarić Pandžić: Brončano doba, u: Stojan Dimitrijević, Tihomila Težak-Gragl, Nives Majnarić Pandžić: Povijest umjetnosti u Hrvatskoj - Prapovijest, Zagreb, 1998., 159-219
- Joseph Maran - Seaborne Contacts between the Aegean, the Balkans and the Central Mediterranean in the 3rd Millennium BC; The Unfolding of the Mediterranean World, u I. Galanaki, H. Tomas, Y. Galanakis, and R. Laffineur (ur.), Between the Aegean and Baltic Seas: Prehistory across Borders (Aegaeum 27), Liège/Austin, 2007, str. 3-21
- Brunislav Marijanović: Cetinska kultura - rana faza, - samostalna kultura ili integralni dio eneolitika, Radovi Filozofskog fakulteta, Razdio povijesnih znanosti, Sv. 36/23 (1997.), Zadar, 1998.
- Ivan Marović: Prethistorijska istraživanja u okolici Narone, Dolina rijeke Neretve od prethistorije do ranog srednjeg vijeka, Izdanja Hrvatskog arheološkog društva, 5, 1980, str. 45-104
- Ivan Marović: Istraživanja kamenih gomila Cetinske kulture u srednjoj Dalmaciji, Vjesnik za historiju i arheologiju dalmatinsku, sv. 84, Split, 1991., str. 15-214
- Ivan Marović, Borivoj Čović: Cetinska kultura, Praistorija jugoslavenskih zemalja, IV, Sarajevo, 1983., str. 191-231
- Darko Periša: Prikaz – Stojan Dimitrijević, Tihomila Težak-Gregl, Nives Majnarić Pandžić: Prapovijest, Zagreb, 1998., Vjesnik za arheologiju i historiju dalmatinsku, 93, Split, 2001., 555-562
- Darko Periša: Brunislav Marijanović, Prilozi za prapovijest u zaleđu jadranske obale, Arheološki vestnik, 54, 2003., str. 422-438
- Ksenija Vinski-Gasparini: Litzen-keramima savsko-dravskog međurječja, Praistorija jugoslavenskih zemalja, IV, Sarajevo, 1983., 484-491
- Gori, Maja; Recchia, Giulia; Tomas, Helen (2018). "The Cetina phenomenon across the Adriatic during the 2nd half of the 3rd millennium BC: new data and research perspectives". 38° Convegno Nazionale Sulla Preistoria, Protostoria, Storia della Daunia.
- Gori, Maja; Di Renzoni, Andrea; Carletti, Elena (2021). "Connecting the Dots in the Adriatic-Ionian Area: Long-Distance Networks in the 3rd Millennium BC". Origini. 45: 147–170.
- Forenbaher, Staso (2018). Special Place, Interesting Times: The island of Palagruža and transitional periods in Adriatic prehist. Archaeopress. ISBN 978-1-78491-850-7.
- Matzinger, Joachim (2025). "Tria corda, oder die Sprachlandschaft des antiken Apuliens". In Emmanuel Dupraz; Antoine Viredaz (eds.). Langues Et Institutions en Italie Méridionale: Les Aires Osques Et Messapiennes Entre Grande-Grèce Et Rome. Schwabe Verlagsgruppe AG Schwabe Verlag. pp. 91–106. doi:10.24894/978-3-7965-5186-4. ISBN 978-3-7965-5186-4.
- Recchia, Giulia (2025). "Cross-cultural encounters and transformation: Overlapping spheres of interactions in the 3rd millennium BC Central Mediterranean". In Nicolis, Franco; Kulcsár, Gabriella; Heyd, Volker (eds.). The Transformation of Europe in the Third Millennium BC, Part 1: Proceedings of the International Conference in Riva del Garda, Italy, 25-28 October 2023. International Conference Riva del Garda. The Yamnaya Impact of Prehistoric Europe. Vol. 7. Budapest: Archaeolingua. pp. 161–182. ISBN 978-615-5766-84-8.
