= Castellieri culture =

Ancient culture in the northern Adriatic during the Bronze and Iron Ages

- Geographical range: Istria, Dalmatia, Northeast Italy, Slovenia
- Period: Bronze Age, Iron Age
- Dates: c. 19th century BC - 3rd century BC
- Preceded by: Cetina culture
- Followed by: Urnfield culture, Histri, Liburnians, Iapydes, Roman Republic

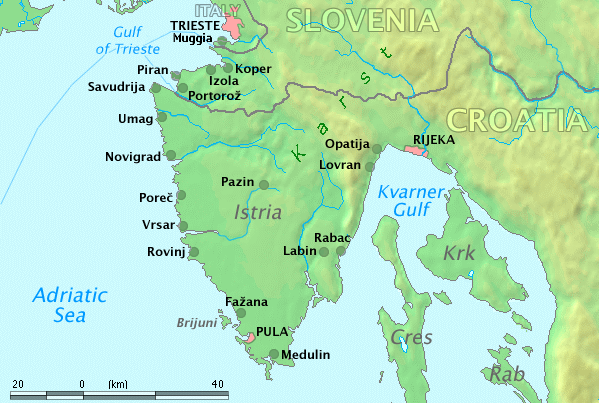
The Istrian peninsula, the originary homeland of the Castellieri culture from the 15th century BC.

The Castellieri culture developed in Istria during the Early and Middle Bronze Age, and later expanded into Slovenia, Friuli, Dalmatia and the neighbouring areas. It lasted for more than a millennium, from the 18th century BC until the Roman conquest in the 3rd century BC. It takes its name from the fortified settlements, Castellieri, which characterized the culture. The term was coined by Carlo Marchesetti (1850–1926), Italian botanist, archaeologist and physician.

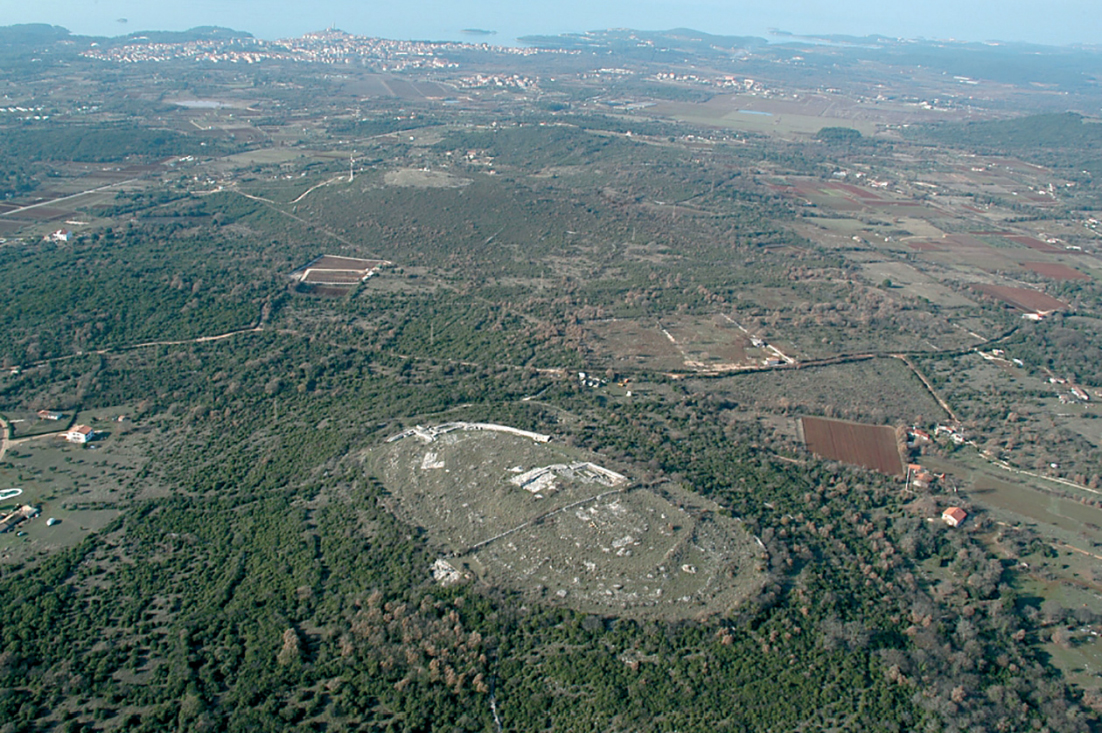
Monkodonja hillfort, Croatia

The ethnicity of the Castellieri civilization is uncertain. The first Castellieri were built along the Istrian coast and show a similar monumental architecture with Cyclopean masonry which can also be found in the Mycenaean civilization. The Monkodonja hillfort shows that the earlierst Castellieri were built already in the 19th century BC.

The Castellieri were fortified settlements, usually located on hills or mountains or, more rarely (such as in Friuli), in plains. They were constituted by one or more concentric series of walls, of rounded or elliptical shape in Istria and Venezia Giulia, or quadrangular in Friuli, within which was the inhabited area.

Some hundred Castellieri have been discovered in Istria, Friuli and Venezia Giulia, such as that of Leme, in the central-western Istria, or Elerji, near Muggia, or Monte Giove near Prosecco (Trieste) and San Polo, not far from Monfalcone. However, the largest Castelliere was perhaps that of Nesactium, in the southern Istria, not far from Pula.

A fundamental study of the pottery from the Castelliere settlements in Istria, which shows the integration of the Castelliere into the wider Early and Middle Bronze Age communication network, was published by Anja Hellmuth Kramberger based on the finds from Monkodonja.

== See also ==
- Monkodonja
- Unetice culture
- Histri
- Carni
- Liburnians
- Adriatic Veneti
- Iapydes
- Bronze Age Italy
- Ancient peoples of Italy

== Classical sources ==
- Livy, Ab Urbe Condita
- Strabo, Geographica, book 5

== Sources ==
- G. Bandelli – E. Montanari Kokelj (a cura di), Carlo Marchesetti e i castellieri, 1903-2003, Atti del Convegno internazionale di Studi (Castello di Duino, 14-15 novembre 2003), Editreg, Trieste 2005.
- Roberto Bosi, L'Italia prima dei Romani, Milano 1989
- Gianna Buti e Giacomo Devoto, Preistoria e storia delle regioni d'Italia, Firenze 1974
- Giacomo Devoto, La civiltà dei castellieri, in Trentino-Alto Adige e Friuli-Venezia Giulia, Ed. De Agostini, Novara 1979
- Ugo Di Martino, Le Civiltà dell'Italia antica, Milano 1984
- Carlo Marchesetti, I castellieri preistorici di Trieste e della regione Giulia, Museo civico di Storia naturale, Trieste 1903.
- Aleksandar Stipčeviċ, Gli Illiri, Milano 1966
- Autori vari, Storia di Roma Vol.I: Roma in Italia, Einaudi, Torino 1988
- Autori vari, Popoli e civiltà dell'Italia antica, Vol. I di Antonio M. Radmilli, Roma 1974
- Autori vari (T.C.I.) Friuli-Venezia Giulia ed. aggiornata, Roma 2005
- K. Buršić-Matijašić: Gradine Istre. Povijest prije povijesti/ Istrian castellieri. History before history, Pula 2007. ISBN 978-953-6487-38-7
- A. Hellmuth Kramberger: Monkodonja: istraživanje protourbanog naselja brončanog doba Istre/ Forschungen zu einer protourbanen Siedlung der Bronzezeit Istriens. Knj. 2, Brončanodobna keramika s gradine Monkodonja./ Teil 2 Die Keramik aus der bronzezeitlichen Gradina Monkodonja. Monografije i katalozi 28. Pula: Arheološki muzej Istre, 2017. ISBN 978-953-6153-92-3, 978-953-8082-03-0, 978-953-8082-04-7
