= Heritage centre =

Museum facility

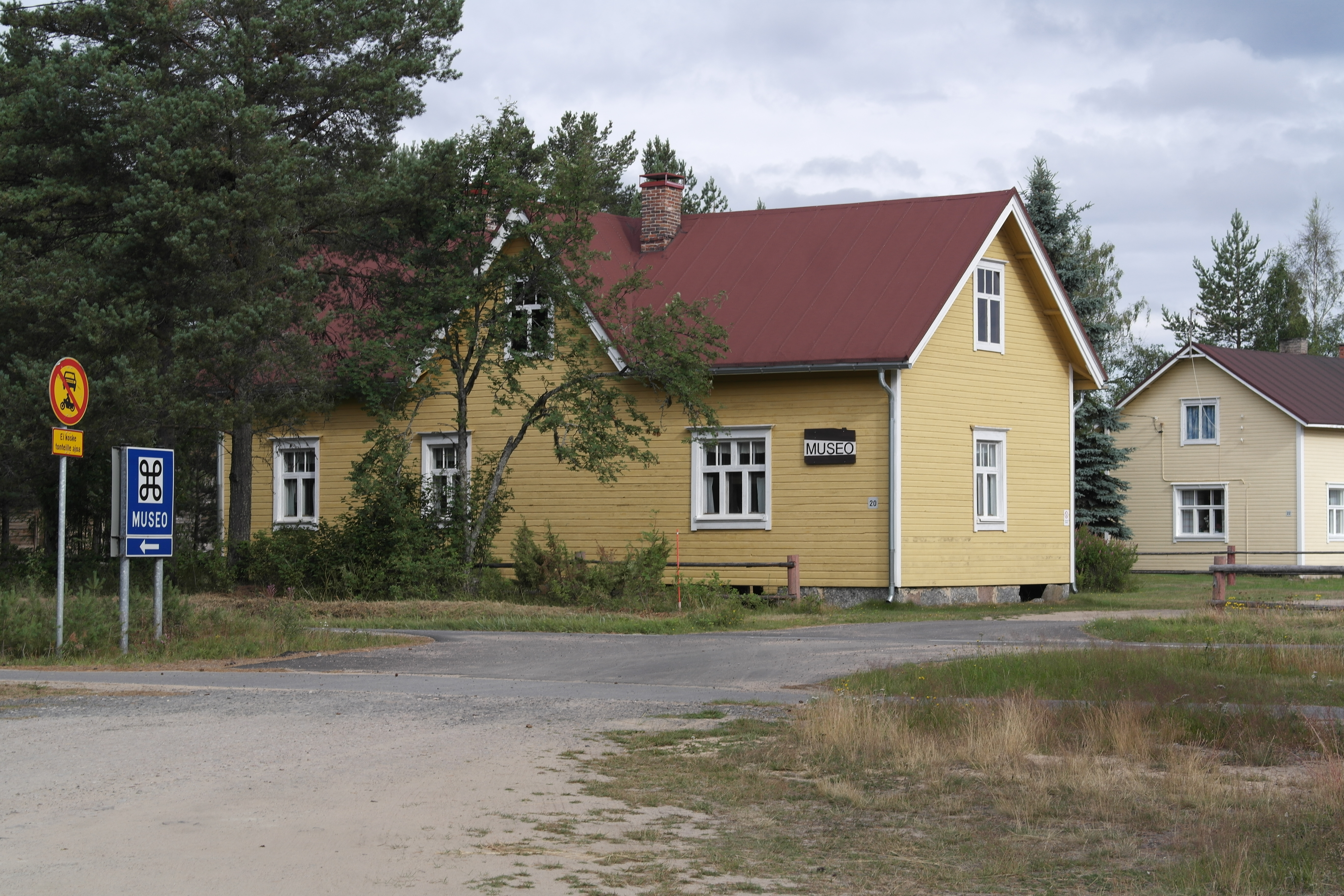
A wooden main building of the Kniivilä Local Heritage Museum in the Hailuoto Island, Finland

A heritage centre, center, or museum, is a public facility – typically a museum, monument, visitor centre, or park – that is primarily dedicated to the presentation of historical and cultural information about a place and its people, and often also including, to some degree, the area's natural history. Heritage centres typically differ from most traditional museums in featuring a high proportion of "hands-on" exhibits and live or lifelike specimens and practical artifacts.

Some are open-air museums – heritage parks – devoted to depiction of daily life or occupational activity at a particular time and place, and may feature re-creations of typical buildings of an era. Such sites are often used for experimental archaeology, and as shooting locations for documentaries and historical-fiction films and television. A few are rebuilt archaeological sites, using the excavated foundations of original buildings, some restore historic structures that were not yet lost, while others are mock-ups built near actual sites of historic value (which may still be subject to ongoing excavation, study, and preservation). Many also have living museum features, such as costumed staff, demonstrations of and short courses in historical craft-working, dramatic presentations (live-action mock combat, etc.), and other living history activities. Others may be more narrowly focused on a particular occupation or industry, such as rail transport or the early factories or mines around which a community developed.

The distinction between a heritage centre or park, and a history-based theme park can become blurred, as at Nikko Edomura, focused on Feudal Japan, and Wild West City, a self-described "heritage theme park" about the American Old West.

== Examples, by theme ==
=== General and multi-era ===
- Gower Heritage Centre
- Irish National Heritage Park
- Ryedale Folk Museum
- St Fagans National Museum of History
- Telugu Saamskruthika Niketanam (World Telugu Museum)

=== Former life-ways in particular eras ===
- Butser Ancient Farm
- Castell Henllys
- Columbia State Historic Park
- Craggaunowen
- Flag Fen Bronze and Iron Age Centre
- Iron-Age-Danube project
- Peat Moors Centre
- Preservation Park
- South Park City
- West Stow Anglo-Saxon Village

=== History of transport, industry, and occupations ===
- Bideford Railway Heritage Centre
- Castlefield
- Crewe Heritage Centre
- Elsecar Heritage Centre
- Heritage Motor Centre
- Lincolnshire Aviation Heritage Centre
- Lowell National Historical Park
- Nottingham Transport Heritage Centre
- Rhondda Heritage Park
- Royal Canadian Mounted Police Heritage Centre

== See also ==
- Heritage interpretation
- Interpretation centre
- List of open-air and living history museums, many of which are heritage-oriented
- Visitor centre
