= Anja Hellmuth Kramberger =

German archaeologist, author and researcher (born 1978)

Anja Hellmuth Kramberger, born Hellmuth (18 February 1978 in Berlin) is a German archaeologist, author and researcher.

== Education ==
After graduating from the Droste-Hülshoff-Gymnasium in Berlin, Anja Hellmuth studied Prehistoric archaeology, Near Eastern archeology and Ancient history at the Free University of Berlin (German: Freie Universität Berlin). She completed her Master of Arts (Magister Artium) with highest honors at the Free University of Berlin in 2005 and received her PhD with summa cum laude in 2008 under the supervision of Biba Teržan and Bernhard Hänsel.

For her master's thesis she was awarded the "Rudolf-Virchow-Förderpreis" by the Berlin Society for Anthropology, Ethnology, and Prehistory (German: Berliner Gesellschaft für Anthropologie, Ethnologie und Urgeschichte), a learned society for the study of anthropology, ethnology, and prehistory founded 1869 in Berlin. Anja Hellmuth received a scholarship (NaFöG) from the Berlin Senate, which supports young scientists for their doctorates. She was awarded a travel grant (Reisestipendium des Deutschen Archäologischen Instituts) from the German Archaeological Institute (DAI) for her doctoral thesis.

== Professional career ==
As a scholarship holder from the German Archaeological Institute, Anja Hellmuth traveled the Mediterranean region for six months. She then moved to Pula, Croatia, between 2009 and 2011 as part of a Feodor Lynen postdoctoral research fellowship from the Alexander von Humboldt Foundation and researched the Bronze Age pottery from the fortified hilltop settlement of Monkodonja. The archaeological site of Monkodonja was excavated between 1998 and 2007 under the direction of Biba Teržan, Bernhard Hänsel and Kristina Mihovilić as an international project funded by the German Research Foundation (DFG). As part of this scholarship, she was also a fellow at the Archaeological Institute of the Research Center of the Slovenian Academy of Sciences and Arts (ZRC SAZU). After the end of the Feodor Lynen research fellowship, Anja Hellmuth returned to Berlin for a year as a Humboldt fellow in the Eurasia Department of the German Archaeological Institute. In 2015, Anja Hellmuth completed her habilitation at the Department of Archeology, Faculty of Arts, University of Ljubljana in Slovenia and began teaching the history and archaeology of the Ancient Near East in the same year. Between 2018 and 2020 she had additional teaching assignments at the University of Graz in Austria (German: Karl-Franzens-Universität Graz).

Under the direction of Hartmut Kühne, Anja Hellmuth Kramberger published a study on finds from the archaeological site Tell Sheikh Hamad in 2016 as a project funded by the German Research Foundation. As part of a Croatian-Korean joint project, Anja Hellmuth Kramberger led the excavations in the fortified hilltop settlement of Monbrodo in Istria between 2016 and 2018. Between 2017 and 2019, she was a researcher and deputy project leader of the Iron-Age-Danube project, which was a part of the Interreg Danube Transnational Program of the European Union. Since 2020, Anja Hellmuth Kramberger has been a researcher and associate professor at Alma Mater Europaea university of the European Academy of Sciences and Arts.

Her research results are manifested in five scientific monographs and dozens of scientific articles. Anja Hellmuth Kramberger is also the co-editor of several anthologies and magazines and regularly acts as a reviewer for scientific journals. Her research on prehistoric pottery from the fortified hilltop settlement of Monkodonja in Istria, published in 2017, can be seen as an important pilot study for the entire Adriatic region during the Early and Middle Bronze Age. In 2023, Anja Hellmuth Kramberger published the first comprehensive representation of the prehistory of the Near East in Slovene language.

== Summer school "Heritology" 2024 ==
Together with the Slovenian heritage specialist and museologist Verena Vidrih Perko, Anja Hellmuth Kramberger organized the first Erasmus Summer school on the topic Heritology between 8 and 12 July 2024 at Alma Mater Europaea University which was under the patronage of former President of Slovenia Borut Pahor. The idea was initiated by Mirza Hasan Ćeman from the University of Sarajevo and carried out in cooperation with the Department of Archaeology of the University of Ljubljana, Faculty of Arts, the National Museum of Slovenia, Park of Military History Pivka and the company Krasen Kras. 40 students and over 30 speakers from all over Europe spent a week discussing questions about the importance of cultural heritage in Europe.

== Trivia ==
In addition to her professional work, Anja Hellmuth Kramberger is also a painter and illustrator. Her drawings of artifacts, excavation findings, reconstructions and interpretations of archaeological heritage appear in numerous scientific publications as well as in the first edition of the novel "Der Radreiter" by Alix Hänsel.

== Selected works ==
=== Books ===
Hellmuth Kramberger, Anja. Arheologija Starega Bližnjega vzhoda: od predkeramičnega neolitika do konca zgodnje bronaste dobe. Ljubljana: Alma Mater Europaea, Fakulteta za humanistični študij – Institutum Studiorum Humanitatis, 2023. ISBN 978-961-6192-87-3

Hellmuth Kramberger, Anja. Monkodonja: istraživanje protourbanog naselja brončanog doba Istre = Forschungen zu einer protourbanen Siedlung der Bronzezeit Istriens. Knj. 2, Brončanodobna keramika s gradine Monkodonja. = Teil 2 = Die Keramik aus der bronzezeitlichen Gradina Monkodonja. Monografije i katalozi 28. Pula: Arheološki muzej Istre, 2017. ISBN 978-953-6153-92-3, 978-953-8082-03-0, and978-953-8082-04-7

Hellmuth Kramberger, Anja. Die Pfeilspitzen aus Tall Šeh Hamad/Dur-Katlimmu von der mittelassyrischen bis zur parthisch-römischen Zeit in ihrem westasiatischen und eurasischen Kontext. Berichte der Ausgrabung Tall Šeh Hamad/Dur-Katlimmu (BATSH) 22. Wiesbaden: Harrassowitz, 2016. ISBN 978-3-447-10605-4

Hellmuth, Anja. Bogenschützen des Pontischen Raumes in der Älteren Eisenzeit: Typologische Gliederung, Verbreitung und Chronologie der skythischen Pfeilspitzen. Universitätsforschungen zur prähistorischen Archäologie 177. Bonn: R. Habelt, 2010. ISBN 978-3-7749-3665-2

Hellmuth, Anja, Untersuchungen zu den sogenannten skythischen Pfeilspitzen aus der befestigten Höhensiedlung von Smolenice-Molpír. Universitätsforschungen zur prähistorischen Archäologie 128. Bonn: R. Habelt, 2006. ISBN 978-3-7749-3419-1

=== Articles ===
Hellmuth Kramberger, Anja. „Skythischen" Invasoren auf der Spur – die sog. skythischen Pfeilspitzen im Spiegel der prähistorischen Konfliktforschung. Das Altertum. 2021, vol. 66, pp. 161–188. ISSN 0002-6646

Hellmuth Kramberger, Anja. ʺSonnenbarkenʺ und ʺMondscheibenʺ im bronzezeitlichen Istrien? Zu zwei besonderen Schalen mit verziertem Boden aus der Gradina von Monkodonja nahe Rovinj, Kroatien. Archaeologia Austriaca. 2020, vol. 104, pp. 153–168. ISSN 0003-8008 doi:10.1553/archaeologia104s153

Kramberger, Bine, Hellmuth Kramberger, Anja. Von neolithischen ʺGroßen Mütternʺ bis zu sumerischen Königen: ein Überblick zum Nachweis des Transports auf dem Kopf in der Vor- und Frühgeschichte. In: Nessel, Bianka (ed.), Neumann, Daniel (ed.), Bartelheim, Martin (ed.). Bronzezeitlicher Transport: Akteure, Mittel und Wege. Universität Tübingen – SFB 1070. Tübingen: Tübingen University Press, 2018. pp. 33–58. ISBN 978-3-947251-04-9 doi:10.15496/publikation-26722

Hellmuth Kramberger, Anja. Bewaffnete Frauen vs. geschmückte Männer: zum Problem des Genderings von Grabbeigaben am Beispiel der frühskythischen Bestattungen am Mittleren Dnepr. In: Keller, Christin (ed.), Winger, Katja (ed.). Frauen an der Macht? Neue interdisziplinäre Ansätze zur Frauen- und Geschlechterforschung für die Eisenzeit Mitteleuropas. Universitätsforschungen zur prähistorischen Archäologie 299. Bonn: R. Habelt, 2017. pp. 227–250. ISBN 978-3-7749-4089-5

Hellmuth Kramberger, Anja. Archäologische Hinweise zu kriegerischen Auseinandersetzungen mit reiternomadischen Gruppen im östlichen Mitteleuropa und im Vorderen Orient. V: Miroššayová, Elena (ed.), Pare, Christopher F. E. (ed.), Stegmann-Rajtár, Susanne (ed.). Das nördliche Karpatenbecken in der Hallstattzeit: Wirtschaft, Handel und Kommunikation in früheisenzeitlichen Gesellschaften zwischen Ostalpen und Westpannonien. Archaeolingua 38. Budapest: Archaeolingua, 2017. pp. 571–589. ISBN 978-615-5766-00-8 ISSN 1215-9239

Hellmuth, Anja. Čuvari hrane in pića: o antropomorfnim ukrasima na posudama iz ranog i srednjeg brončanog doba s gradine Monkodonja u Istri = Guardians of food and drink: about anthropomorphic vessel decorations of the Early and Middle Bronze Age from the Monkodonja hillfort in Istria. Histria archaeologica: časopis Arheološkog muzeja Istre. 2012, vol. 43, pp. 19–46. ISSN 0350-6320

Hellmuth, Anja. Zur Datierung der kreuzförmigen Goryt- und Bogentaschenbeschläge im Karpatenbecken. Praehistorische Zeitschrift. 2007, vol. 82, pp. 66–84, ilustr. ISSN 0079-4848 doi:10.1515/PZ.2007.004

Hellmuth, Anja. Zum Untergang der hallstattzeitlichen befestigten Höhensiedlung von Smolenice-Molpír in der Südwestslowakei. Mitteilungen der Berliner Gesellschaft für Anthropologie, Ethnologie und Urgeschichte. 2006, vol. 27, pp. 41–56. ISSN 0178-7896
