= Breadloaf idol =

Bronze Age European tablets

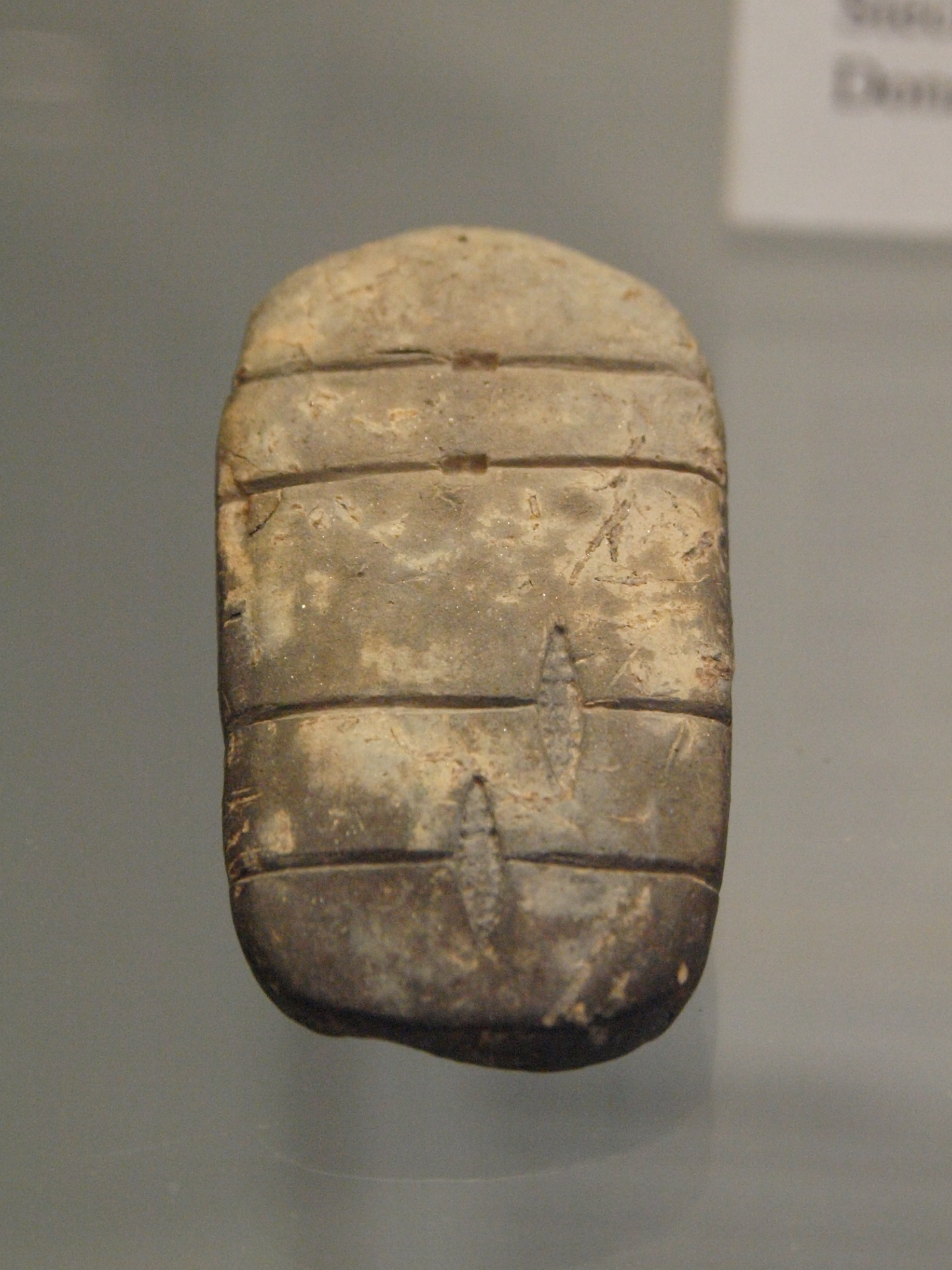
"Breadloaf idol" found at Mangolding, Mintraching, Germany

Breadloaf idol (German: Brotlaibidol) is a temporary working name given by German archaeologists to hundreds of similar baked clay tablets of unknown purpose, found at several Bronze Age sites in Europe dated between 2100 and 1400 BCE. They are referred to simply as "enigmatic tablets" (Italian: tavolette enigmatiche) by Italian archaeologists.

== Description ==
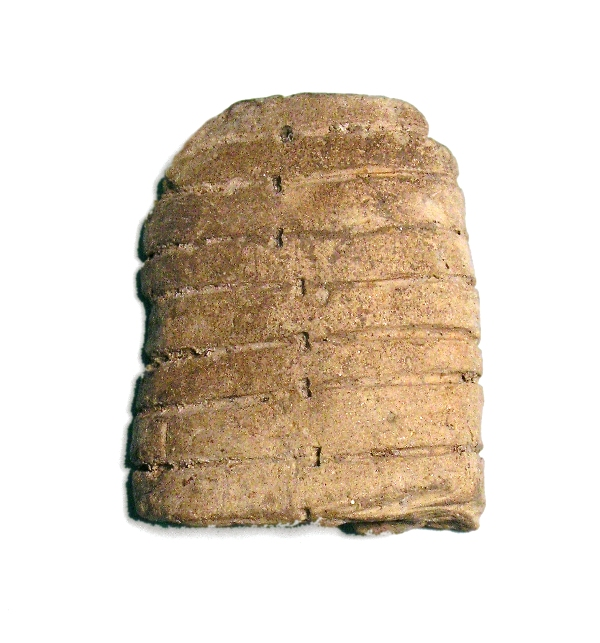
Split "Breadloaf idol" from the Lavagnone site, Lonato del Garda, Lombardy, Italy

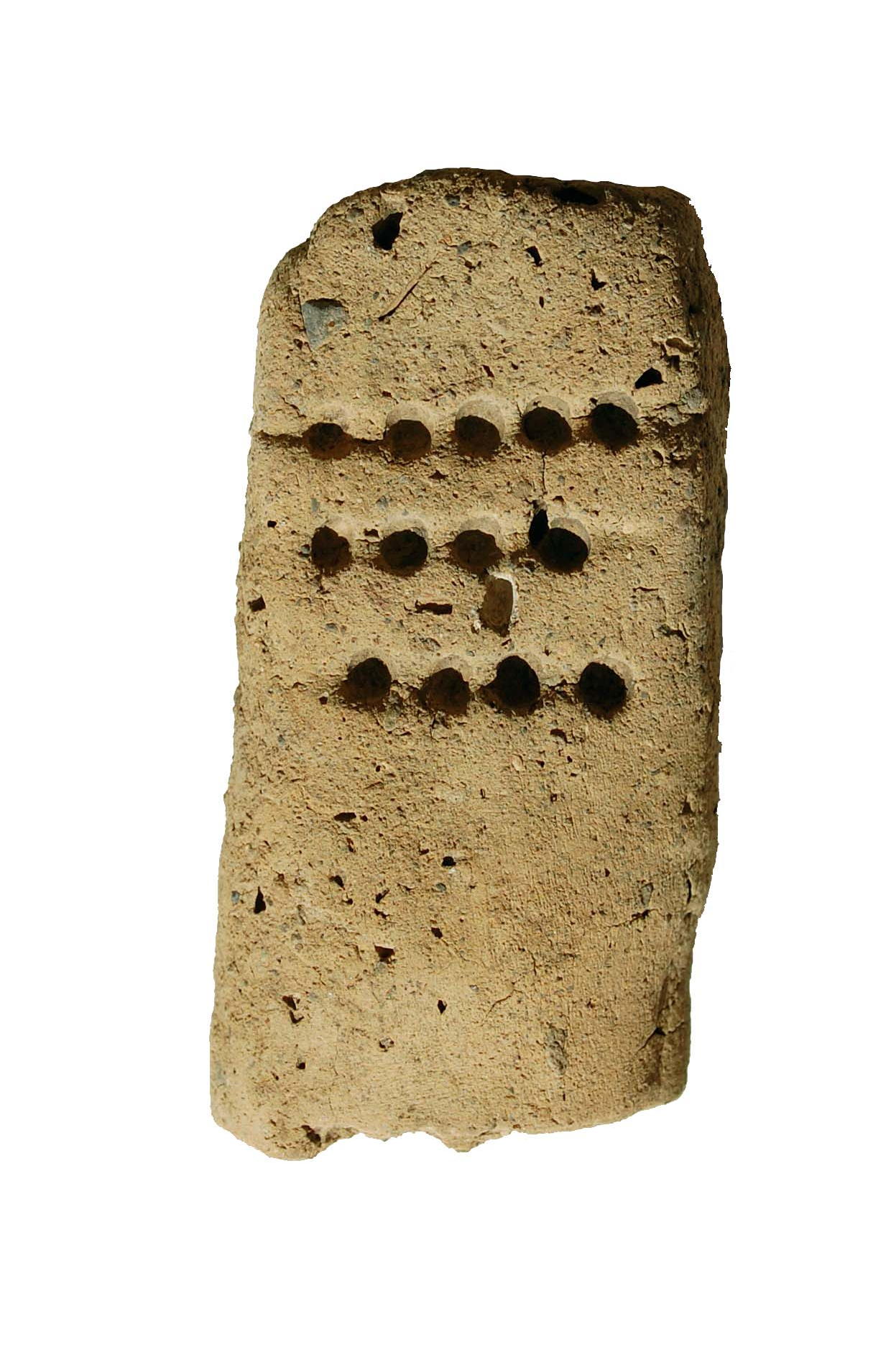
"Breadloaf idol" from the Sotciastel site, Badia, Alto Adige, Italy

The tablets are generally rectangular with rounded corners, a shape that inspired their current German name. A typical size is 15 by 7 cm and 2 cm thick, but there is considerable variation around those numbers. Most are made of baked clay.

The tablets typically have decorations on only one of the broad faces. Most have one or more straight grooves across the smaller dimension, apparently drawn with a blunt stylus. The grooves sometimes continue down the sides of the tablet, and rarely a little on the back side. A variety of marks are stamped or punched over, between, above, or below those grooves. Each tablet normally has only one or two types of mark.

Some of the mark types that are found include:

A round dot or circle.
A circle with a dot at the center.
Two concentric circles.
Two concentric circles connected by spokes .
An X-like cross.
Two dots adjacent to each other on either side of a groove.
Two dots, each with a fan of outgoing rays.
An elongated rectangule.

A large fraction of the known tablets were found split in two along the shorter dimension. The matching half is sometimes missing.

=== Round 'tablets' in France ===
At several sites scattered over Southern France, eight clay artifacts have been found that bear strong resemblance to the breadloaf idols in material, overall size, and decoration; except that they are round with a small hole at the center, and the grooves are radial instead of parallel.

These "rolled up tablets" range between 3.7 and 7 cm in diameter, and the central hole is about 2 mm wide. Four of them, from the eastern half of the area, have four radial strokes; the other four, from the western half, have eight. One of them is made of stone and decorated on both sides; the rest is baked clay and decorated only on one side. Two of the disks are broken in half.

== Occurrence ==
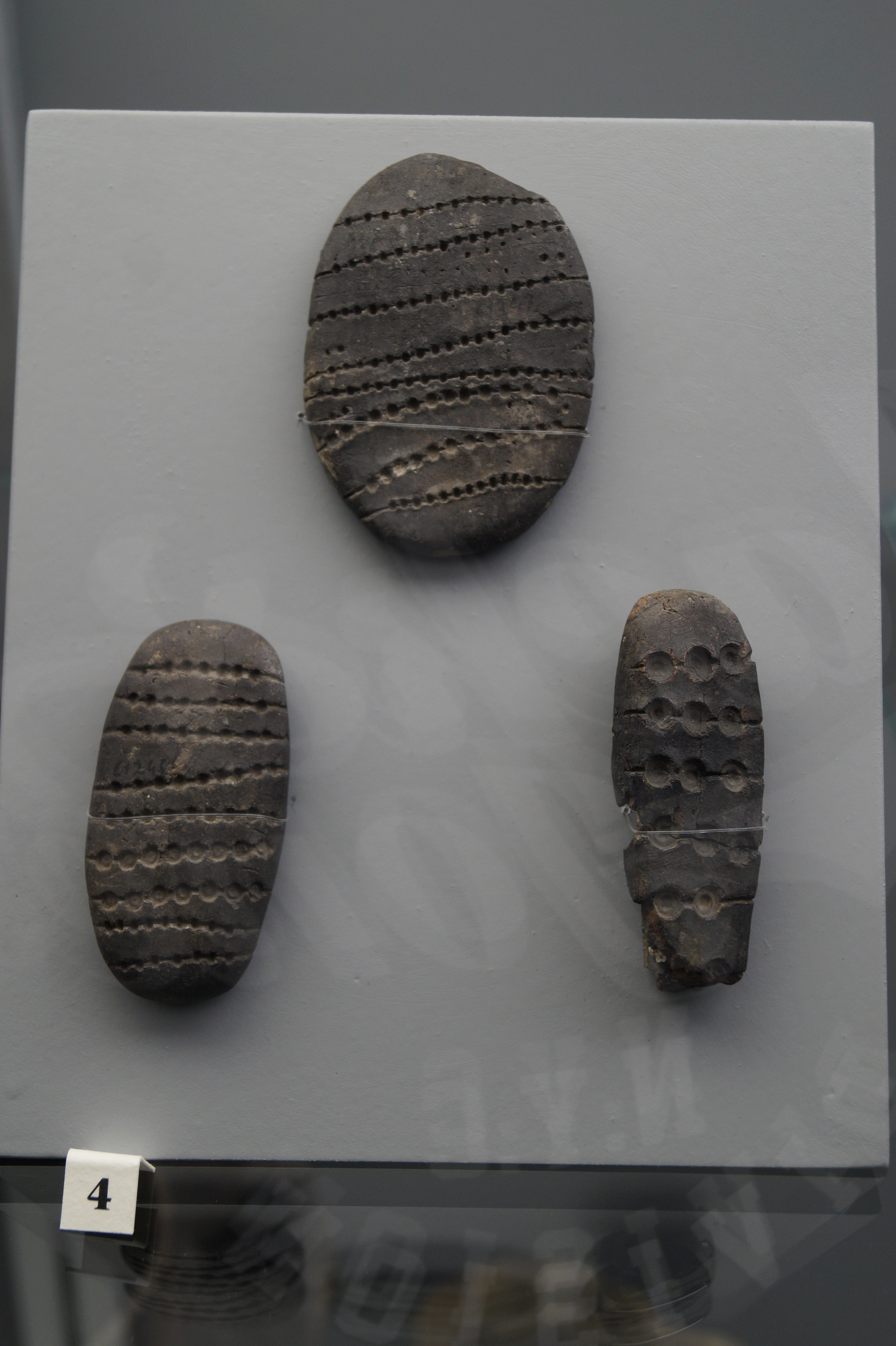
"Breadloaf idols" from the Polada palafite site, Lonato del Garda, Lombardy, Italy

The first tablets were discovered in Hungary in the 1860s.

The archaeological context of about 20% of the extant samples is unknown or uncertain. Of those with known context, most come from three regions:

- South of Lake Garda and in the Po valley in northern Italy, attributed to the Polada culture.
- The middle Danube basin (Austria, Czech Republic, Slovakia); most in Unterwölbling V and Mad'arovce contexts, but one with Litzen-style pottery.
- The lower Danube basin (Serbia and Romania), in the Žuto Brdo-Gârla Mare culture area.

Two other areas with multiple tablet finds are the Tisza River and its tributaries, mostly in Otomani culture contexts (with one from the Wietenberg culture); and an area in southwest Germany, in the Arbon culture context. Isolated tablets have also been found in Germany and Poland (associated with the Urnfield culture), Bulgaria, central Italy and Corsica. An early example from Rubiera in Italy was associated with Bell Beaker pottery. Six tablets were found in the area around Lake Bistreţ in 1991–1995.

Some tablets are associated with the Únětice culture.

All but two of samples with known provenance were found in sites of ancient settlements. One was found in a cave and one found within the filling rubble of the 'princely grave' of Bornhöck, (and a few more in the surrounding settlements).

== Theories ==
The purpose of the tablets is still wholly unknown. They were initially conjectured to be ritual objects but their occurrence within the sites has mostly excluded that possibility.

The distribution of mark types across and within the tablets also seems to exclude a writing system. The same features make it unlikely that they were an accounting system like the early Sumerian tribute/trade tally tablets.

On the other hand, the way many tablets are split, and the absence of the matching half suggest a purpose related to trade or other social interaction, possibly similar to the tally sticks. Calendars, game pieces, and stamps for decorating ceramics or textiles have also been suggested.

According to Harald Meller they probably represent a 'sign system' involved in trade. They are often found broken in two which may indicate some sort of credit/debt system. They could have been used as proof of identity or representation.

The use of stamps for the "symbols" is unusual and has drawn comparison with the Phaistos disk, which happens to be roughly contemporaneous, even though there is no resemblance between the symbols themselves.

== Research ==
=== Exhibitions ===
In 2010 a major exhibition was organized on the 'enigmatic tablets' from the Archaeological Museum of Upper Mantua in Cavriana with the collaboration of thirty-five other museums. One hundred examples of enigmatic tablets were exhibited. Another exhibition took place at the Manching Museum.

Another international exhibition, collecting a large number of tablets, was held at the Frankfurt Archaeological Museum in 2024–2025.

=== Digitization ===
In 2015 an international project was launched to study the tablets involving various Italian and foreign universities. The artefacts have been analysed and categorised using a three-dimensional scanning and measuring technique that allows for a precise morphological comparison to be made between tablets.
