= Kotorac =

Kotorac may refer to:

- Gornji Kotorac, Istočna Ilidža, Republika Srpska, Bosnia and Herzegovina
- Kotorac, Montenegro
