= Monkodonja =

Bronze Age hill fort, located near Rovinj, Istria, Croatia

Coordinates: 45°04′14″N 13°41′53″E

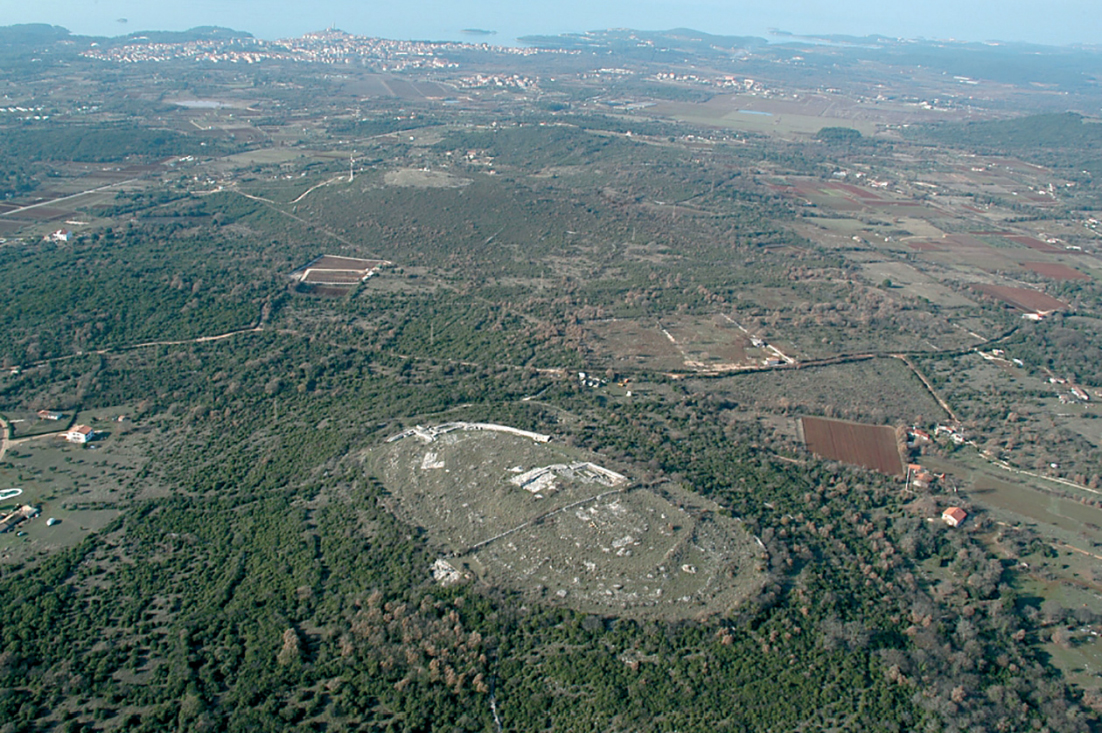
Monkodonja Bronze Age hillfort, with surroundings and coastline in the background.

Monkodonja is a Bronze Age hillfort located near the city of Rovinj in the Croatian region of Istria. It was occupied between about 1850/1750 and 1500/1450 BC.

== Description ==
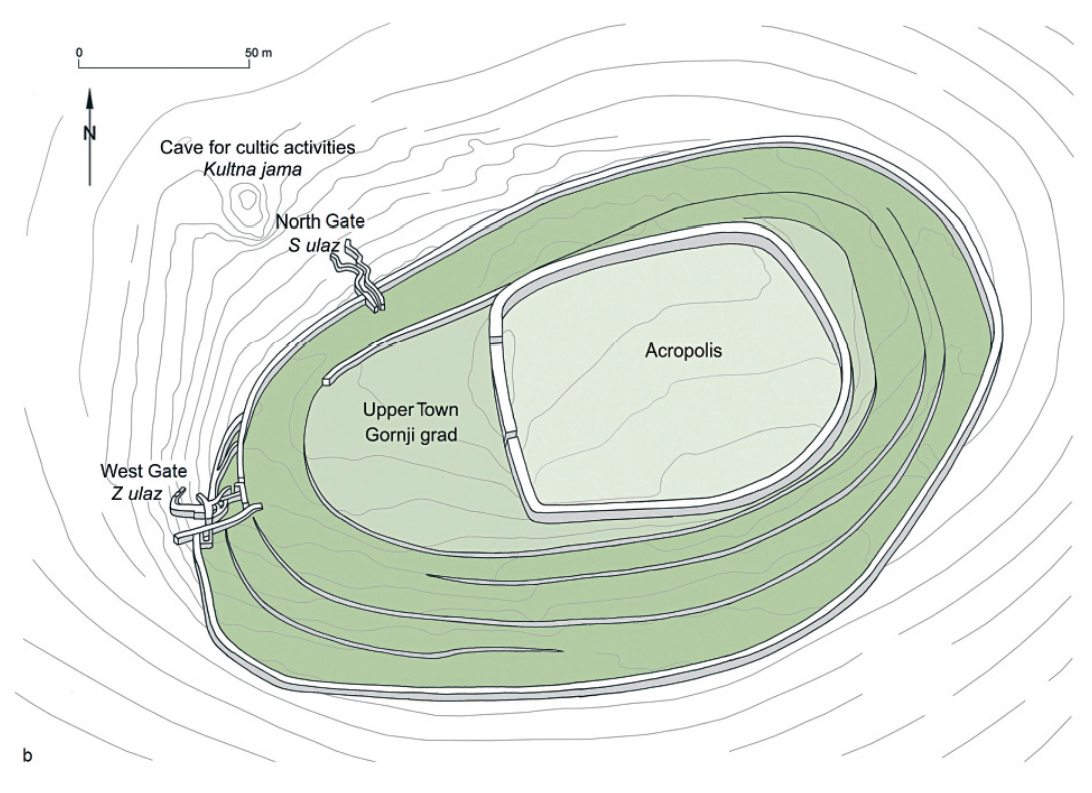
Diagram of the Monkodonja hillfort

Monkodonja lies on a small hill, 81 m above sea level, and forms an irregular ellipse stretching east–west that is 250 m long and 160 m wide. The settlement was surrounded by three concentric walls and has two entrances that have been explored so far (the so-called Western and Northern Gates). The walls are dry stone constructions, with Cyclopean masonry reminiscent of Mycenean architecture. Not far from the northern gate there is a cave, more than 50 m deep, in which Bronze Age pottery and a Neolithic burial were discovered. Bronze Age cist graves were found in the western gate. The defensive wall surrounding the settlement was about 1 km long, about 3 m wide and at least 3 m tall. The stone for the walls was quarried directly from the hill, and its removal resulted in the creation of a flat plateau. Approximately 1,000 people would have lived in the well-organized settlement: on the highest part was the acropolis, below it the upper town, and still lower the lower town. The acropolis, where the upper class of the population lived, had a nearly rectilinear outline. In other parts of the settlement there were crafting areas. The houses differed in position, size and manner of construction, and were separated by passages and streets. The houses had hearths, within which were found numerous fragments of handmade pottery that originated from local workshops. Monkodonja was an important point in the communications of the northern Adriatic with Central Europe and the Aegean. Findings of so-called loaf-of-bread idols (or tavolette enigmatiche or Brotlaibidol) provide evidence of the integration into a Bronze Age communication network.

The settlement was abandoned in the middle of the 15th century BC after an event in which parts of the buildings burned down. Monkodonja was not inhabited during the Late Bronze and Iron Ages. A silver denarius of Emperor Augustus dating 13 BC indicates sporadic visits to the site during the Roman Empire.

== Excavations and research ==
The hillfort was discovered in 1953 by B. Baćić and B. Marušić, and the first research was carried out in 1953–1955. Between 1997 and 2009, multidisciplinary international research has been conducted under the leadership of Bernhard Hänsel, Kristina Mihovilić and Biba Teržan from the Freie Universität Berlin, the Archaeological Museum of Istria in Pula, and Arheološki muzej Istre, university in Ljubljana. The pottery from Monkodonja was analyzed and published by Anja Hellmuth Kramberger. The study emphasizes the integration of Monkodonja into the broad Early and Middle Bronze Age communication networks of the region.

== Graves in the western gate ==
The western gate of Monkodonja was modified and reinforced over several centuries. In the course of the excavations, two stone cist graves were discovered on the left and right side of the gate lane. Stone cist A was set in a square pedestal and contained bones from numerous individuals. The remains are not anatomically complete. Radiocarbon dates suggest that the earliest burials in stone cist A date back to before 2000 BC, thus before the settlement of Monkodonja was established. The youngest radiocarbon date falls into the 17th century BC. Stone cist A also contained grave goods, jewelry made of bronze wire and bronze sheet, as well as reddish-orange beads possibly imitating amber. Stone cist B was found in a corner construction of the wall on the other side of the gate lane. As with stone cist A, people had been buried in this grave for a long time, although the skeletons, with one exception, are not anatomically complete. Radiocarbon dating of the bones shows that the stone cist was used between the 21st and 17th centuries BC.

== The burial mounds ==
1 km southeast of Monkodonja lies the Monsego or Mušego hill, where several stone burial mounds were discovered. It is assumed that Monsego was Monkodonja's cemetery, however, only part of the population was buried in the stone burial mounds. For the majority of the Bronze Age population we do not know what their graves looked like or where they were located. The skeletons in the stone cists are not anatomically complete, which means that the remains of the deceased were not placed in the grave in their entirety. As in Monkodonja, grave goods in the form of bronze jewelry and several amber beads were found in the stone cists.

== Europa Nostra Award ==
In 2002, research in Monkodonja was awarded the Europa Nostra Award. The exemplary excavations, in which the walls were reconstructed in situ in parallel to the excavation work, were acknowledged. Today the excavation site is open to tourists as an Archaeological Park.

== Award from the Croatian Archaeological Society ==
In 2022, Biba Teržan and Kristina Mihovilić received a prize from the Croatian Archaeological Society (Hrvatsko arheološko društvo) for the publication of research results from Monkodonja.

== Literature ==
Bernhard Hänsel, Kristina Mihovilic, Biba Terzan: Monkodonja: Istraživanje protourbanog naselja brončanog doba Istre. Knjiga 1—Iskopavanje i nalazi građevina/ Monkodonja: Forschungen zu einer protourbanen Siedlung der Bronzezeit Istriens. Teil 1—Die Grabung und der Baubefund. Monografije i katalozi Arheološki muzej Istre 25, Pula 2015, Pula 2015, ISBN 978-953-6153-92-3

Hellmuth Kramberger, Anja. Monkodonja: istraživanje protourbanog naselja brončanog doba Istre = Forschungen zu einer protourbanen Siedlung der Bronzezeit Istriens. Knj. 2, Brončanodobna keramika s gradine Monkodonja. = Teil 2 = Die Keramik aus der bronzezeitlichen Gradina Monkodonja. Monografije i katalozi 28. Pula: Arheološki muzej Istre, 2017. ISBN 978-953-6153-92-3, 978-953-8082-03-0, 978-953-8082-04-7

Hellmuth Kramberger, Anja. ʺSonnenbarkenʺ und ʺMondscheibenʺ im bronzezeitlichen Istrien? Zu zwei besonderen Schalen mit verziertem Boden aus der Gradina von Monkodonja nahe Rovinj, Kroatien. Archaeologia Austriaca. 2020, vol. 104, pp. 153–168. ISSN 0003-8008 doi:10.1553/archaeologia104s153

== Gallery ==
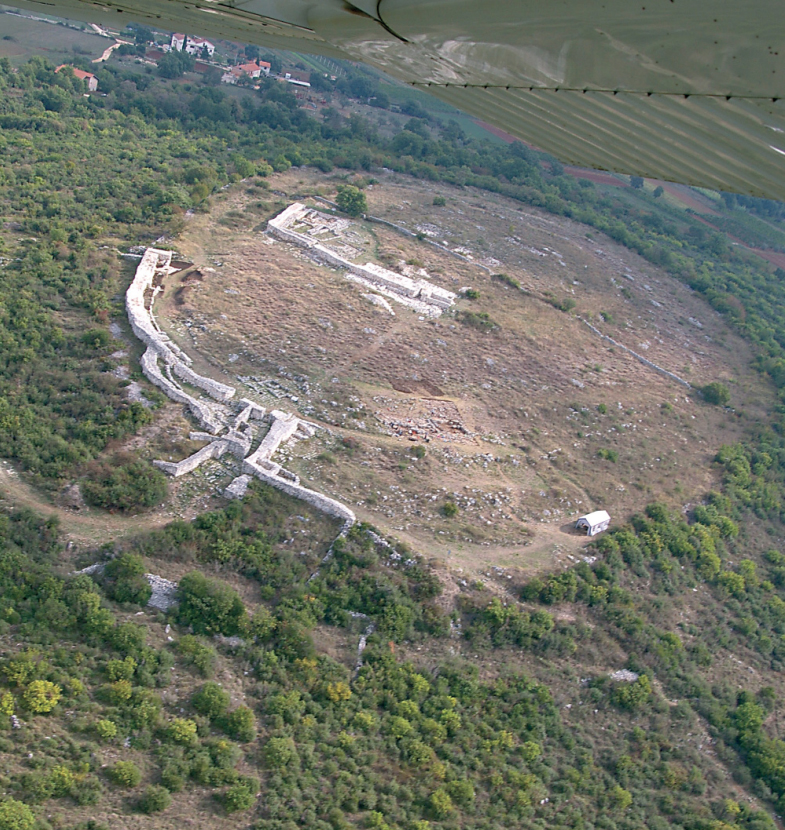
Aerial view

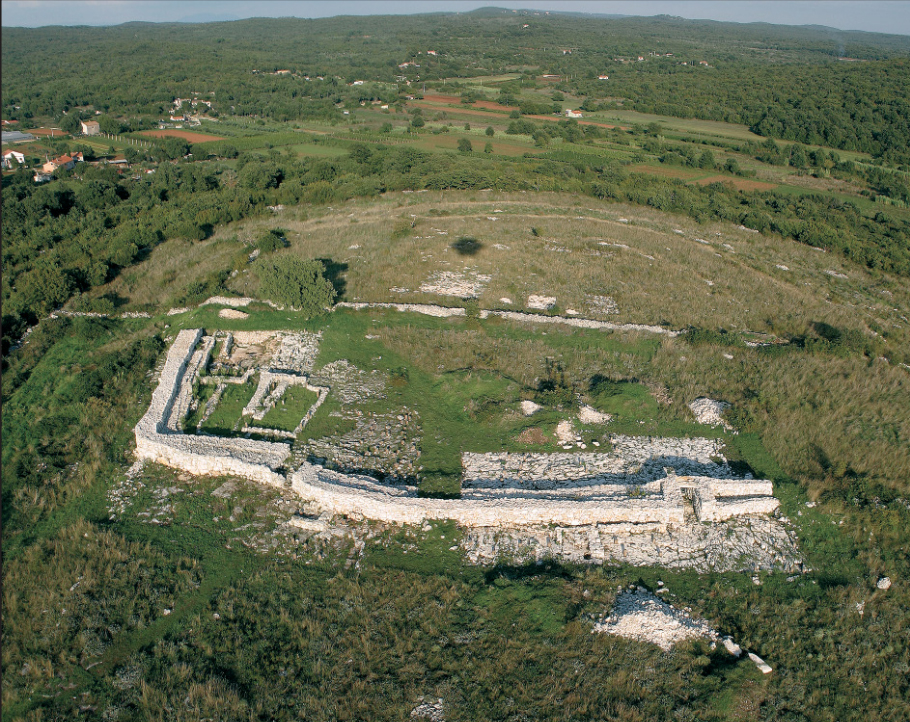
Remains of the acropolis

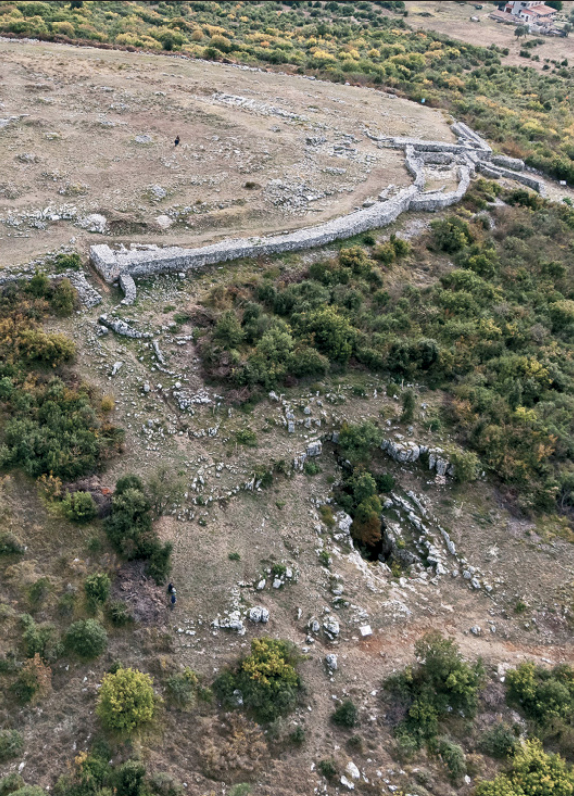
Remains of the fortifications

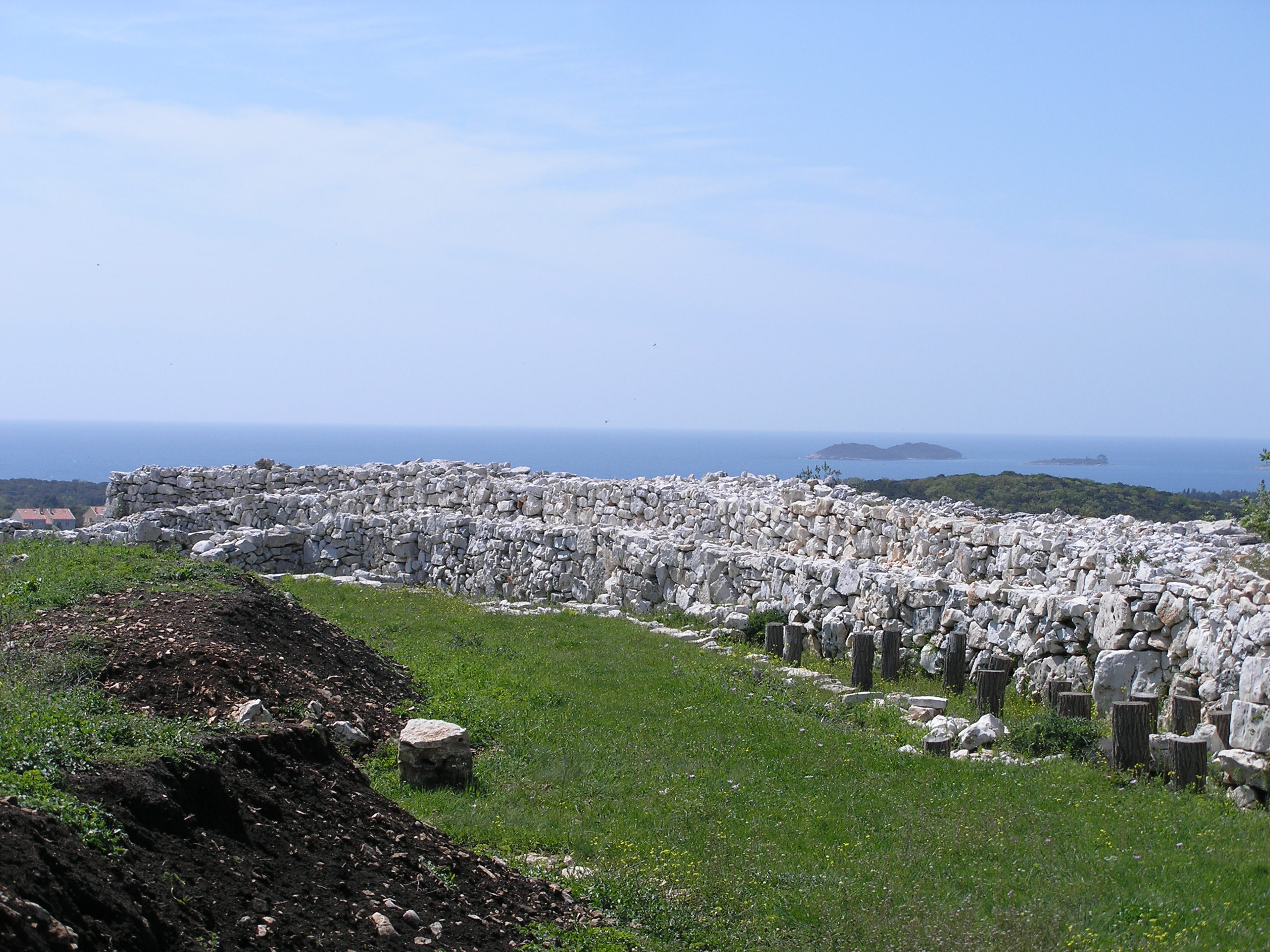
Walls of Monkodonja

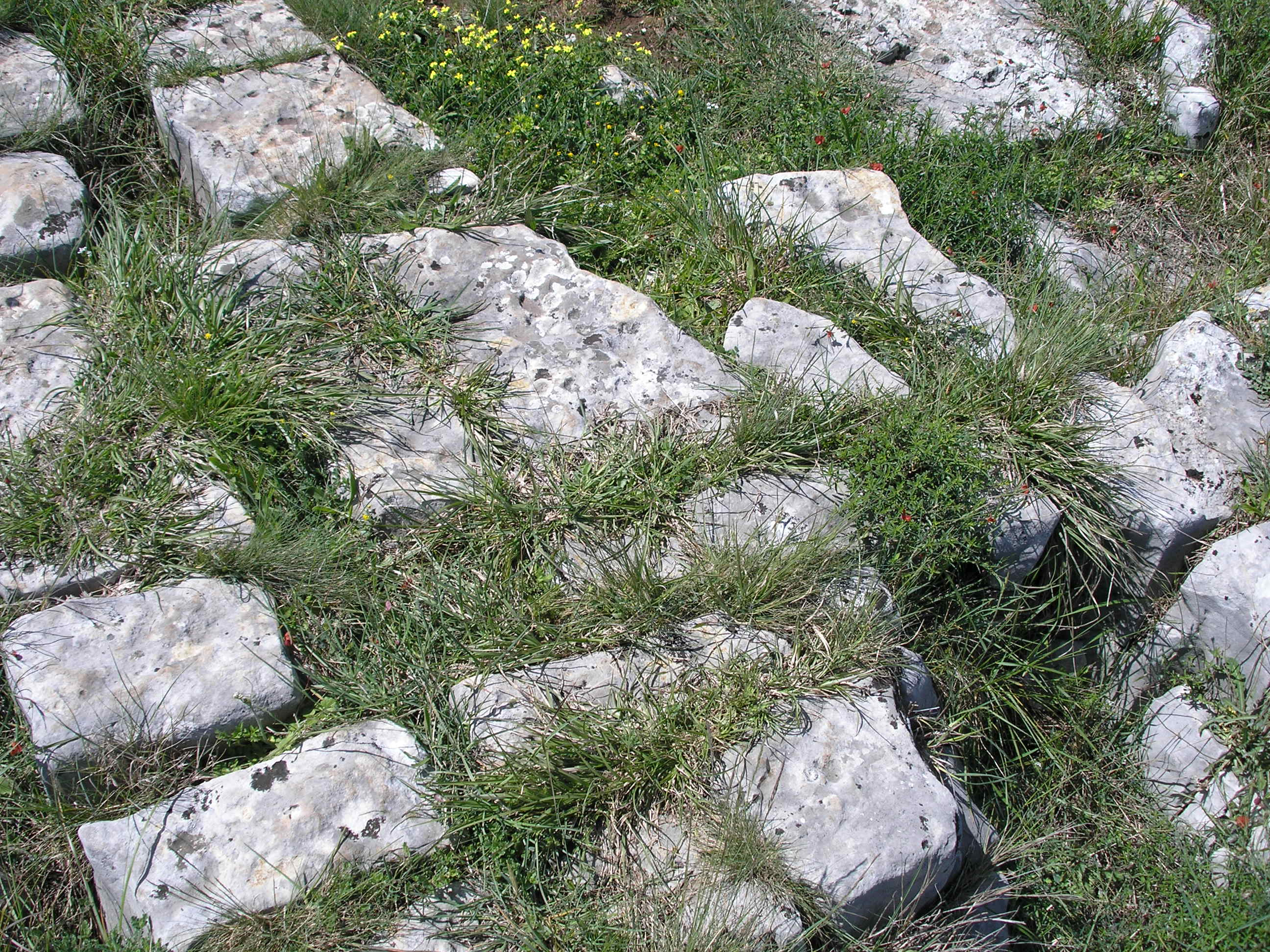
Pavement

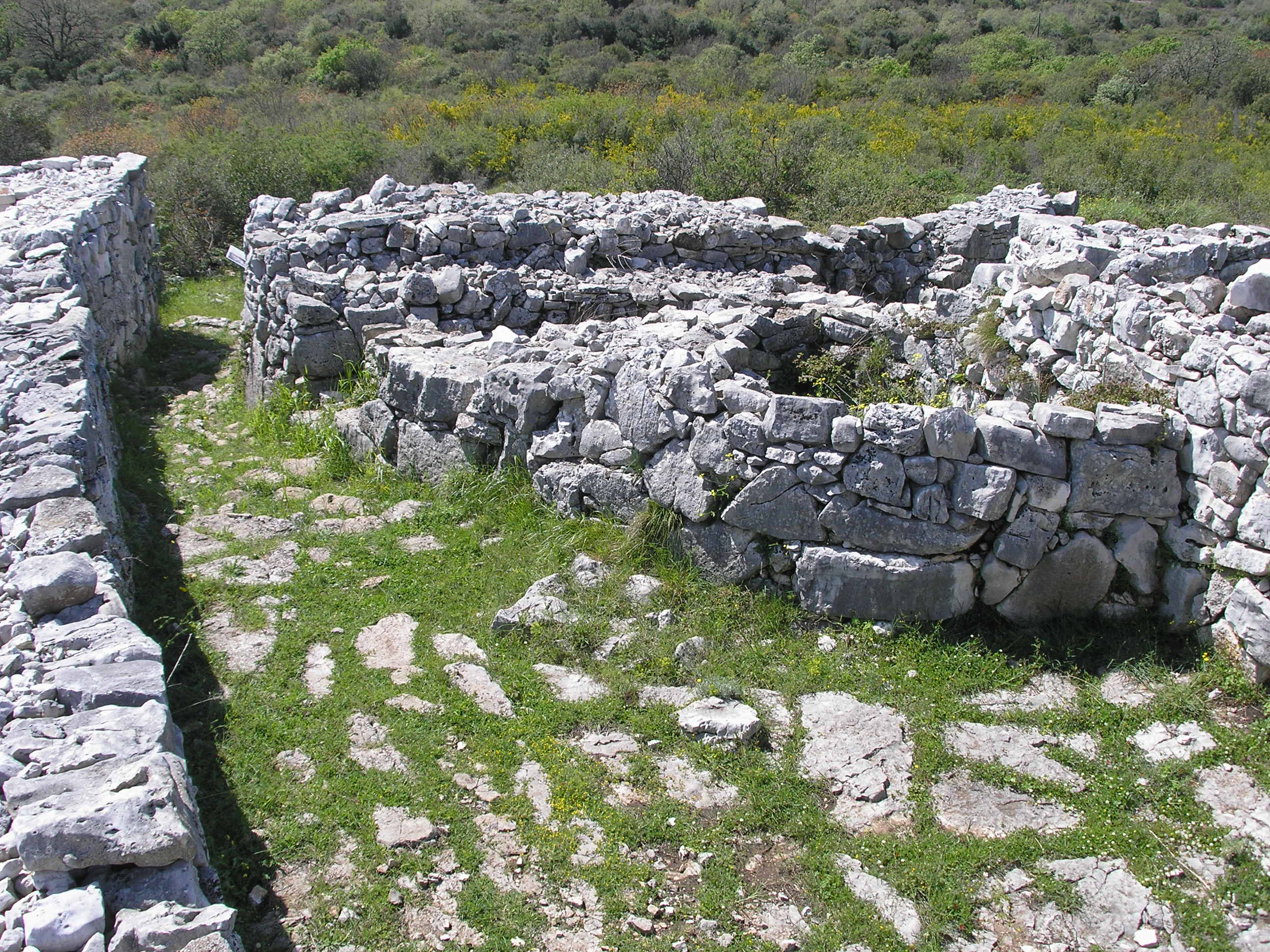
Entrance

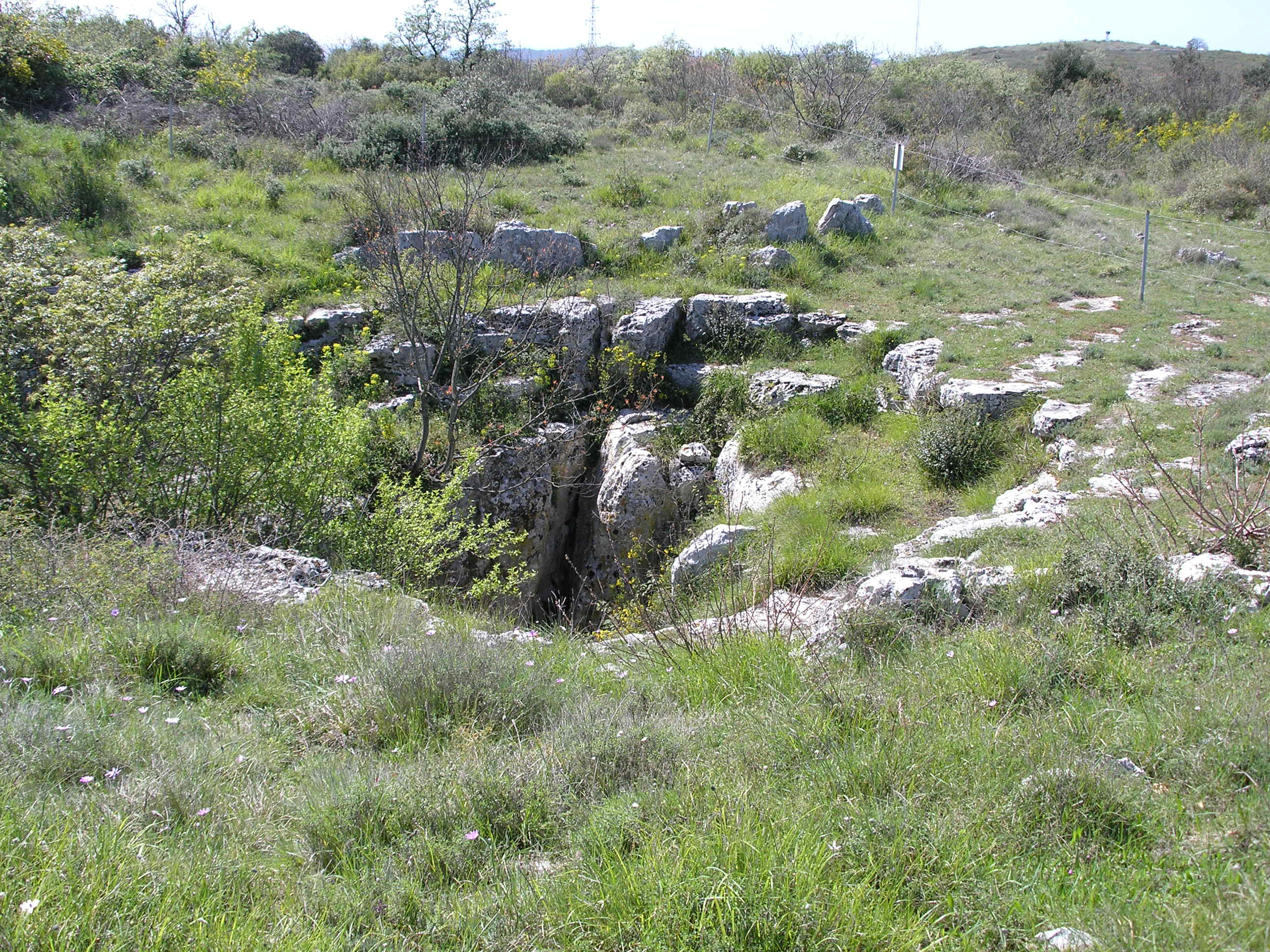
Cult cave near Monkodonja

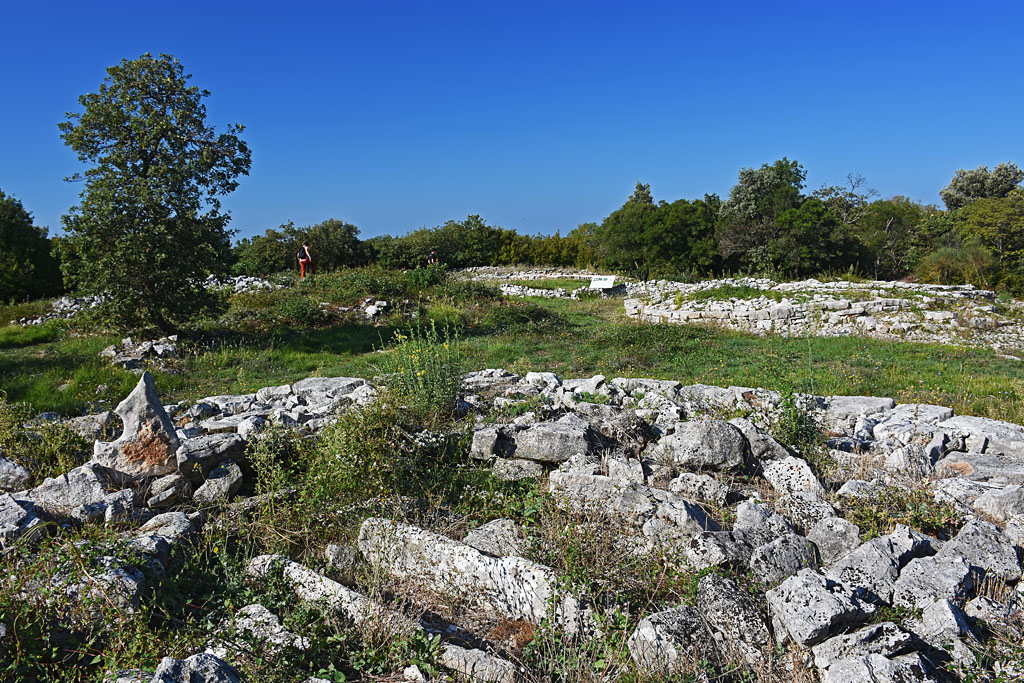
Monsego, tumuli
