= Unterwölbling culture =

The Unterwölbling culture is an Early Bronze Age culture that thrived between 2300 and 1800 BCE in the region roughly bounded by the Danube, the Lower Austrian Alpine foothills, the Enns River, and the Vienna Woods.

The main localities are in the lower parts of Danube tributaries, including the Enns, Ybbs, Melk, Fladnitz, Traisen, and Great Tulln. This culture probably originates from the Late Neolithic Bell Beaker culture and was subsequently replaced by the Böheimkirchen (Veterov culture) culture.

The name was coined in 1937 by Richard Pittioni after the site of Unterwölbling, a small town in present-day municipality of Wölbling in Lower Austria, about 1.5 km northwest of Oberwölbling.

The Unterwölbling culture made their metal products primarily from forged sheet metal and decorated them with dots. Remains of leather caps held/decorated by strips of bronze sheet metal have been found as grave goods in women's graves. The jewelry attributed to this culture also included chains with links made of a variety of materials (shells, amber, bronze, bronze sheet rolls, bone, etc.), with trapezoidal pendants made of bone.

== See also ==
- Únětice culture
- Ottomány culture
