= Iron-Age-Danube project =

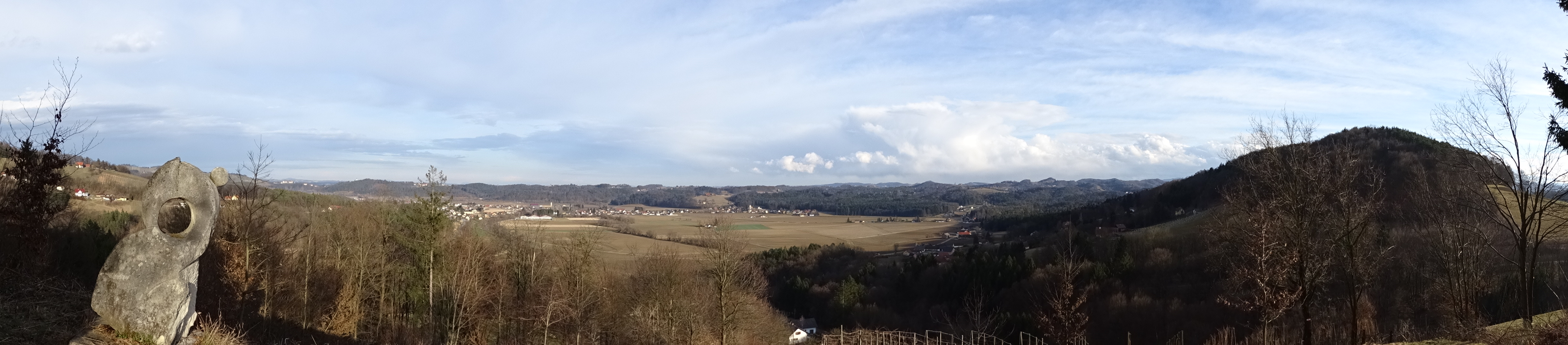
View from the Königsberg in Southern Styria.The Königsberg is one of the archaeological sites in the Styrian micro-region Großklein.

Iron-Age-Danube was a project that ran from 2017–2019 that worked on communicating archaeological research to the general public. It was a part of the Interreg Danube Transnational Programme of the European Union.

In the Iron-Age-Danube project the early Iron Age landscapes in the Danube river basin are explored with the help of modern technology and traditional archaeological tools. The participating partners from Austria, Croatia, Hungary, Slovakia and Slovenia worked together to promote the concept of archaeological landscapes beyond single archaeological sites in these countries.

The project was funded by the European Union with about 2.169.200 EUR from the European Regional Development Fund (ERDF). These ERDF resources make 85% of the total project volume which is about 2.552.000 EUR.

The Iron-Age-Danube project lasted from 1 January 2017 till 30 June 2019.

== Goals ==
The major goal of the project was to communicate an image of archaeological research and the Iron Age landscapes to the visitors and to raise the awareness for the importance of archaeological monuments for the human history.

Another goal was the protection of the monuments and landscapes as well as their sustainable use for the tourism. To strengthen the local tourism, already existing archaeological parks or trails were revitalised. New visitor programs in form of digital and analogous tools were developed and implemented in 9 micro-regions. The micro-regions are: Großklein and Strettweg (Austria), Jalžabet and Kaptol (Croatia), Poštela and Dolenjske Toplice (Slovenia) and Százhalombatta, Süttő and Sopron (Hungary).

In June 2018 the Iron-Age-Danube Project was selected by an Independent Jury as one of 21 finalists for the RegioStars Awards in the 2018 edition.
