= Gornji Kotorac =

Coordinates: 43°48′30″N 18°21′23″E

Gornji Kotorac Горњи Которац
- Interactive map of Gornji Kotorac
- Country: Bosnia and Herzegovina
- Entity: Republika Srpska
- Municipality: Istočna Ilidža
- Time zone: UTC+1 (CET)
  - Summer (DST): UTC+2 (CEST)

Gornji Kotorac (Serbian Cyrillic: Горњи Которац) is a part of the city of Istočno Sarajevo in Istočna Ilidža municipality, Republika Srpska, Bosnia and Herzegovina.

== History ==
In 2019, some parts of the area were without mains water.
