= Únětice =

Únětice may refer to:

- Únětice (Plzeň-South District), a municipality and village in the Plzeň Region, Czech Republic
- Únětice (Prague-West District), a municipality and village in the Central Bohemian Region, Czech Republic
- Únětice culture, an archaeological culture of the Central European Bronze Age
