= Únětice (Prague-West District) =

- Municipality
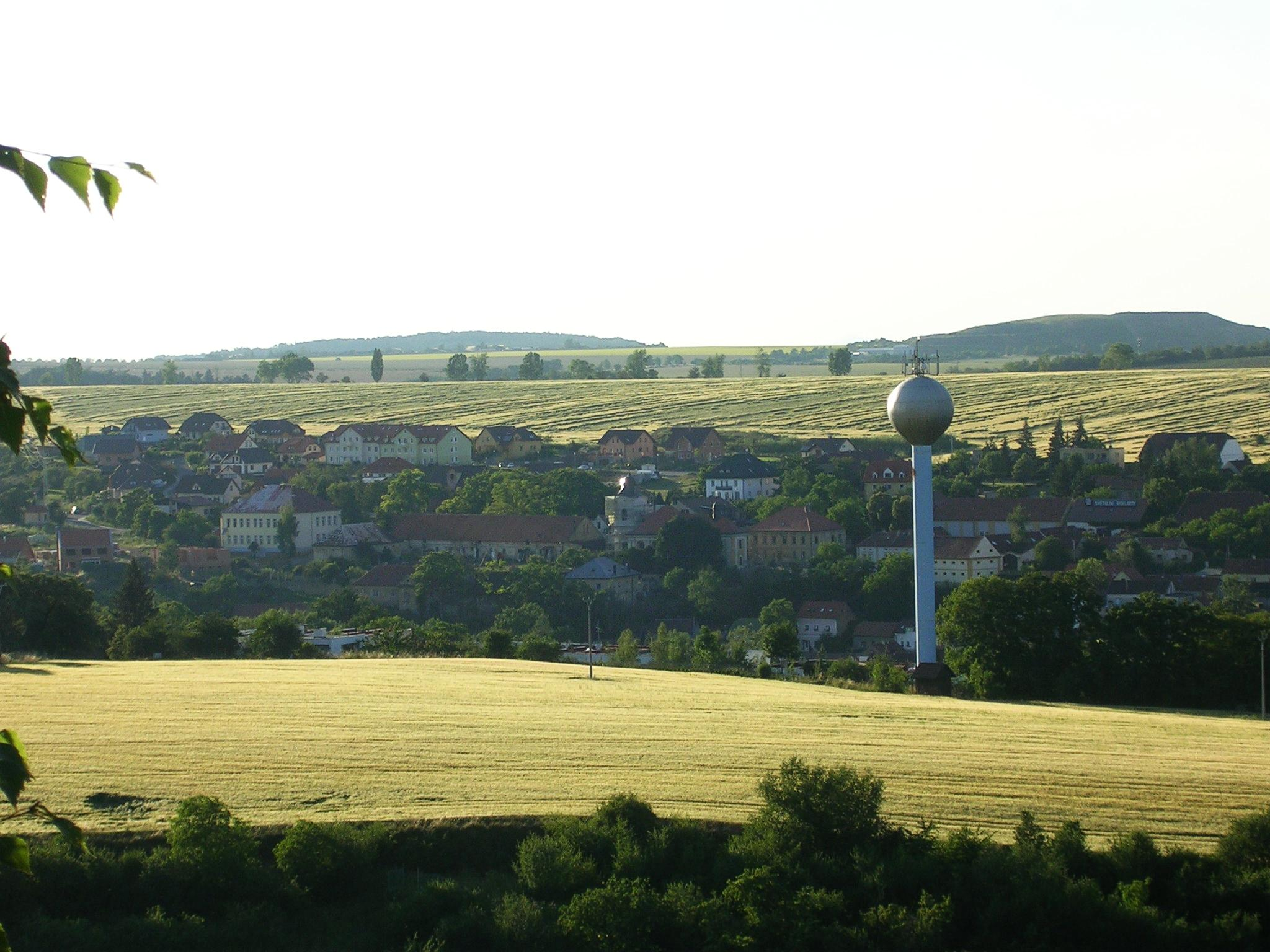
- General view

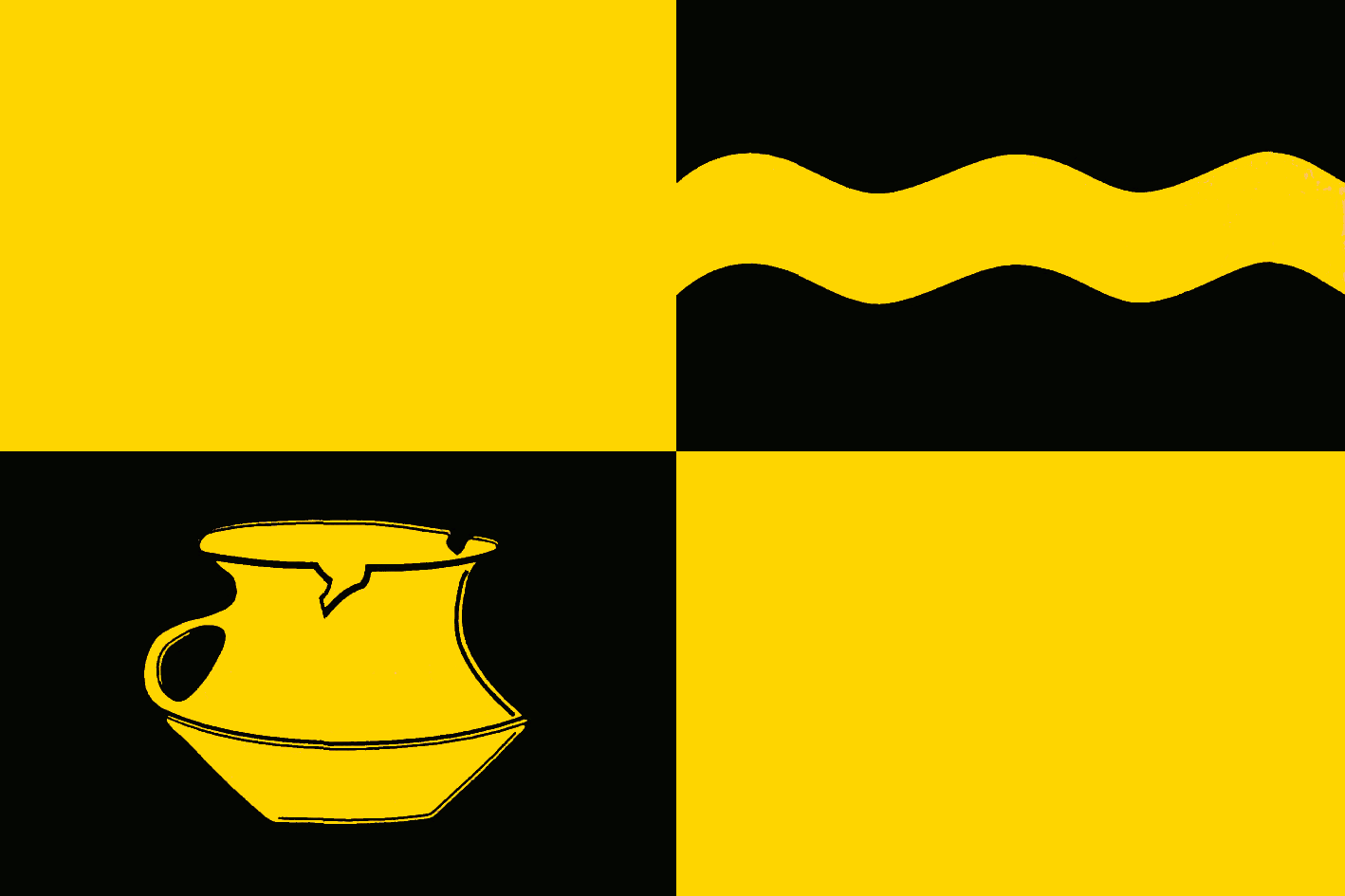
- Flag Coat of arms

- Location in the Czech Republic
- Coordinates: 50°9′0″N 14°21′15″E
- Country: Czech Republic
- Region: Central Bohemian
- District: Prague-West
- First mentioned: 1125

Area
  - Total: 3.15 km^{2} (1.22 sq mi)
- Elevation: 252 m (827 ft)

Population (2026-01-01)
  - Total: 919
  - Density: 292/km^{2} (756/sq mi)
- Time zone: UTC+1 (CET)
  - Summer (DST): UTC+2 (CEST)
- Postal code: 252 62
- Website: www.unetice.cz

Únětice is a municipality and village in Prague-West District in the Central Bohemian Region of the Czech Republic. It has about 900 inhabitants. Únětice is the namesake of the Bronze Age Únětice culture.

== Economy ==
The municipality is known for its small Únětice Brewery. The brewery was built in 1710 and in 1897 it was the third biggest brewery by production in the region. The beer brewing ended in 1949, but in 2011 the tradition was renewed.

== Demographics ==
Historical population
Year	Pop.	±%
1869	394	—
1880	425	+7.9%
1890	505	+18.8%
1900	553	+9.5%
1910	592	+7.1%
1921	489	−17.4%
1930	606	+23.9%
1950	440	−27.4%
1961	364	−17.3%
1970	335	−8.0%
1980	391	+16.7%
1991	423	+8.2%
2001	481	+13.7%
2011	706	+46.8%
2021	934	+32.3%
Source: Censuses
