= Jovan Dobrača =

Serbian merchant

Jovan Dimitrijević (Serbian: Јован Димитријевић; 1765–1839), known as Jovan Dobrača (Добрача) or Jova (Јова), was a Serbian revolutionary, a merchant by trade, who financed the First Serbian Uprising (1804–1813) and participated in the successful Second Serbian Uprising (1815) as a commander.

== Life ==
Jovan Dimitrijević was born in 1765 in Dobrača, a village he was nicknamed after. He was a prosperous merchant of great repute who volunteered to help Karadjordje when he was contemplating the first insurrection. Later, Dobrača prepared funds to build schools in Belgrade, modelled on the contemporary architecture of Pest and Vienna. He was also in favour of building a bookstore. But he's best remembered as a revolutionary and financier of the freedom-fighters of the time.

== Another Serbian uprising ==
He is recorded in history as a voivode in the Second Serbian Uprising. He was one of the commanders of the Serbian army in the Battle of Ljubić in 1815. Immediately following the liberation of Rudnik, Serbian Revolutionaries commanded by Lazar Mutap-Čačanin began attacking Ottoman positions near Čačak. On 6 May 1815 the Ottomans responded to Serbian incursions by sending a force of 7,000-strong under Imšir Ćaja-paša to attack the rebels from the rear. The rebels quickly retreated to Ljubić hill, where they regrouped and were reinforced with detachments commanded by Miloš Obrenović and Jovan Dimitrijević Dobrača. The initial Serbian forces were 1,500 infantry and 200 cavalry, with additional reinforcements of 3,000 men. The battle ended with 6,700 Turks killed including their leader (Išmir Ćaja-paša and his immediate subordinate Kara-Mustafa) while the Serbs had 1,500 killed, including voivodes Lazar Mutap-Čačanin and Tanasko Rajić. The City of Čačak was liberated and so too other cities (Kragujevac, Jagodina, Karanovac, Batočina, and Požarevac) would followed suit .

Before the battle, Jovan Dimitrijević Dobrača personally made sure that his men had everything they needed. The Knyaz of Gruža as Jovan Dobrača was officially called, equipped his battalion of 500 fighters with weapons and food before arriving at the battle site with Milić Drinčić who brought a company of 200 men from Montenegro. Next to them was Raka Levajac and his men.

Dobrača spent his entire earned wealth in wars, and Prince Miloš Obrenović gave him a small pension just before the end of his life. Jovan Dobrača before he died became blind and completely forgotten. He was buried in Drača, nine kilometres from Kragujevac, more precisely in front of the church gate of the Drača monastery.

== Legacy ==
Streets in Belgrade, Čačak, Kragujevac and Požarevac bear his name.

== See also ==
- List of Serbian Revolutionaries
