= Raka Levajac =

Serbian Revolutionary (1777–1833)

- Рако Левајац
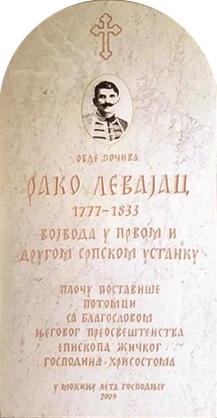
- Tombstone of Raka Levajac
- Born: 1777; Leva, Ottoman Empire (present-day Serbia)
- Died: 1833 (aged 55–56); Mojsinje, Ottoman Empire (present-day Serbia)
- Military career
- Allegiance: Revolutionary Serbia
- Service years: 1803–1813
- Rank: Vojvoda
- Conflicts: First Serbian Uprising; Second Serbian Uprising

Raka Levajac (Serbian Cyrillic: Рако Левајац; 1777 – 1833) was a Serbian Vojvoda, a military commander of Serbian Revolutionary forces during both First Serbian Uprising and Second Serbian Uprising, the armed insurrections of the Serbian population against the Ottoman Empire. Raka Levajac was remarkably close to both uprising leaders, Obrenović and Karadjordje, before falling out of grace with each of them. A celebrated leader at a time he died in poverty after losing status and fortune.

== Early life ==
Raka Levajac was born in 1777 in Leva^{a}, he had two brothers Panta and Radosav, little is known of his father who died when he was young; his mother Jelenka remarried and Raka and his two brothers followed her to the village of Gornje Gorevnica at the beginning of 1800. Raka started working with Nikola Lunjevica a merchant and cattle trader.

Lunjevica played a significant role in the life of Raka Levajac, thanks to his financial assistance Levajac began to trade cattle on his own dealing with Zemun merchants, supplying food and livestock to the Austrian army, thus increasing his reputation and wealth; through his trade, he also met fellow livestock merchant Karađorđe and the brothers Milan and Miloš Obrenović.

== First Serbian Uprising ==
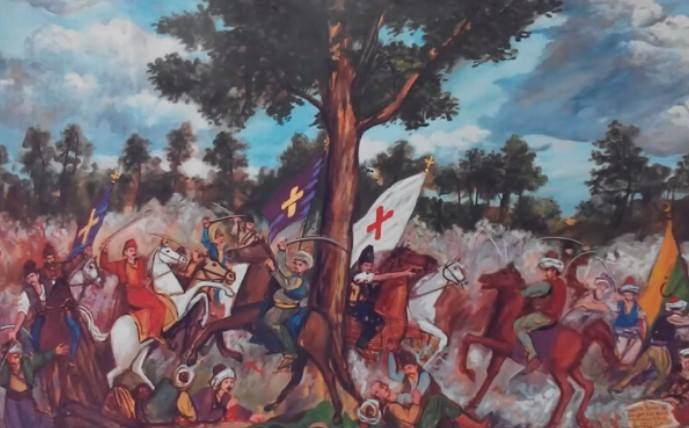
A depiction of the Battle of Dublje on 26 July 1815; in the battle, Raka Levajac distinguished himself.

In 1804 Raka Levajac responded to Karadjordje's call for an uprising and participated in the Ostružnica Assembly, the first national assembly of Serbia taking place from May 6 to 15 May 1804. The Assembly discussed the development of the uprising, the organization of the uprising government and the acquisition of weapons.

Raka Levajac was part of Karadjordje's delegation at the negotiations with the Turks in Zemun in 1804. The negotiations were held under the auspices of Austria, from April 28 to May 10, 1804. Karadjordje appeared with sixteen selected Serbian envoys including Raka Levajac as the representative of Western Pomoravlje.

He participated in the battles on Mišar (1806) and Ljubić. After the rebel victory near Sjenica and Suvodol in the spring of 1809, Raka Levajac crossed over Kolašin with Milan Obrenović and 3500 rebels heading towards the Montenegrin border.
Karađorđe appealed to the fraternity of the Montenegrins and Bosnians to restore the unity of the Serbian nation. Karađorđe sent a diplomatic delegation consisting of Čolak-Anta Simeonović and Raka Levajac as advance party to Montenegro.

However with the terrible defeat at Kamenica in May 1809 and the fall of Deligrad Karađorđe hastened back to the rescue of Serbia and withdrew all his troops besieging Novi Pazar, forcing him to abandon plans to extend the uprising to Montenegro. Raka Levajac and Čolak-Anta Simeonović remained in Moraca until September 1809 until then they were able to make their way to Serbia carrying a letter from Bishop Peter I to Karađorđe.

Raka Levajac was made Vojvoda of Uzice in 1810 right after the death of Milan Obrenović. He held the title until 1813 when, after a confrontation with Karadjordje when he refused to carry an order to arrest hajduks, he was stripped of his title. After the collapse of the uprising, Raka Levajac remained in Serbia returning to his trade.

== Second Serbian Uprising ==
When the Second Serbian Uprising broke out Raka Levajac again joined the rebellion. It is believed that one of Sulejman Pasha Skopljak's sons were killed by Levajac after the Battle of Ljubić (8 May 1815). He notably participated in the Battle of Dublje, fought in Dublje on 26 July 1815. Vojvoda Milić Drinčić and Sima Nenadović were killed in the battle but the Ottomans suffered great losses as well. The rebels managed to stop the Ottoman troops from Bosnia and more importantly captured the Ottoman commander Ibrahim Pasha. With this battle ended the armed part of the Second Serbian Uprising. After the death of Vojvoda Milić Drinčić the title of Vojvoda of Moravia was offered to Raka Levajac by Miloš Obrenović, making him Vojvoda again with his authority extended to twenty-two villages of the Principality of Moravia.

== Later years and death ==
According to some historians he rebelled against Prince Milos Obrenović in 1824 and in 1825, he was stripped of his title and spent the rest of his life in poverty He died in 1833 and was buried next to the church of Mojsinje. In 1935 a new church was built in Mojsinje and his tombstone disappeared in the process, it was created again in 2009.

== Legacy ==
On May 2, 2009, a memorial plaque was unveiled at the Mojsinje church by Bishop Hrizostom (Stolić). Milan Đ. Milićević mentioned him in his work: "Monument". A street in Gornji Milanovac is named after him. In November 2008, Goran R. Levajac published in the Serbian magazine Novosti: "Morava Duke Raka Levajac" retracing Raka Levajac's story in six chapters.

== Notes ==
a.The origin of his name is related to the village of Leva in the Takovo region.

== See also ==
- List of Serbian Revolutionaries
- Stevanović, Mihailo M. (1893). "Hajduk-Veljko i njegova braća" (in Serbian). Požarevac: Mihailo Kostić. Archived from the original on 2014-07-19.
- Горан Р. Левајац: Моравски војвода Рака Левајац („Вечерње новости“, фељтон, 8-13. новембар 2008)
- Потомци основали удружење и поставили спомен-плочу („Курир“, 4. мај 2009)
- Спомен-плоча војводи Левајцу („Политика“, 5. мај 2009)
- Бранио српску нејач („Глас јавности“, 5. мај 2009)
