= Vatin culture =

Archaeological culture in Serbia

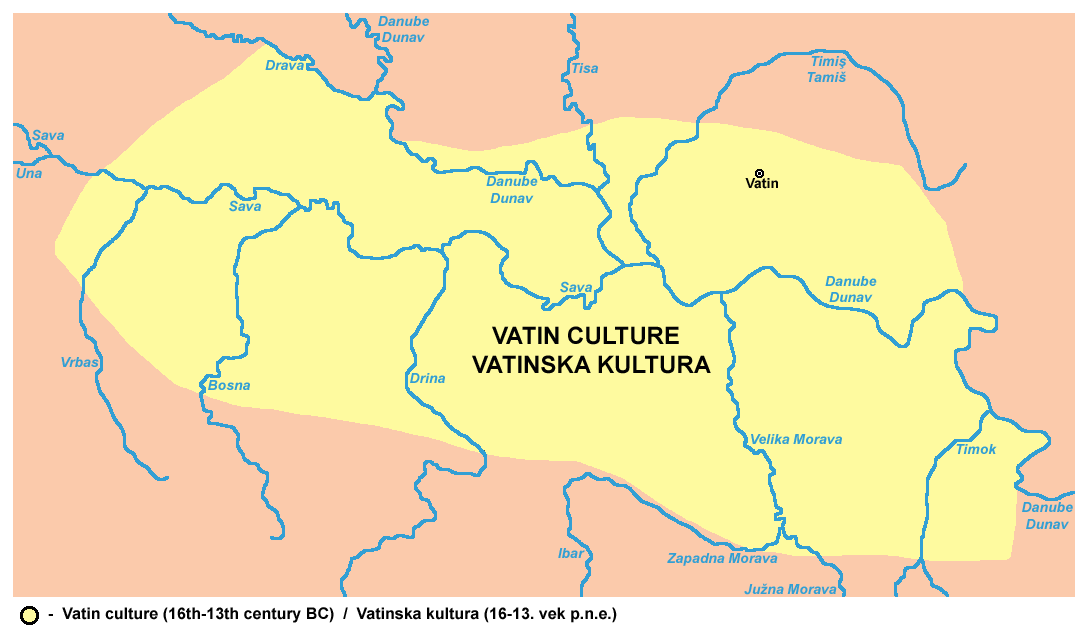
- Period: Bronze Age
- Dates: c. 2000 – 1500 BC/13th century BC
- Type site: Vatin
- Characteristics: Cultural ties with Mycenae; Defensive structures
- Preceded by: Somogyvár-Vinkovci culture, Nagyrév culture, Vučedol culture
- Followed by: Encrusted Pottery culture, Belegiš culture, Urnfield culture, Glasinac-Mati culture

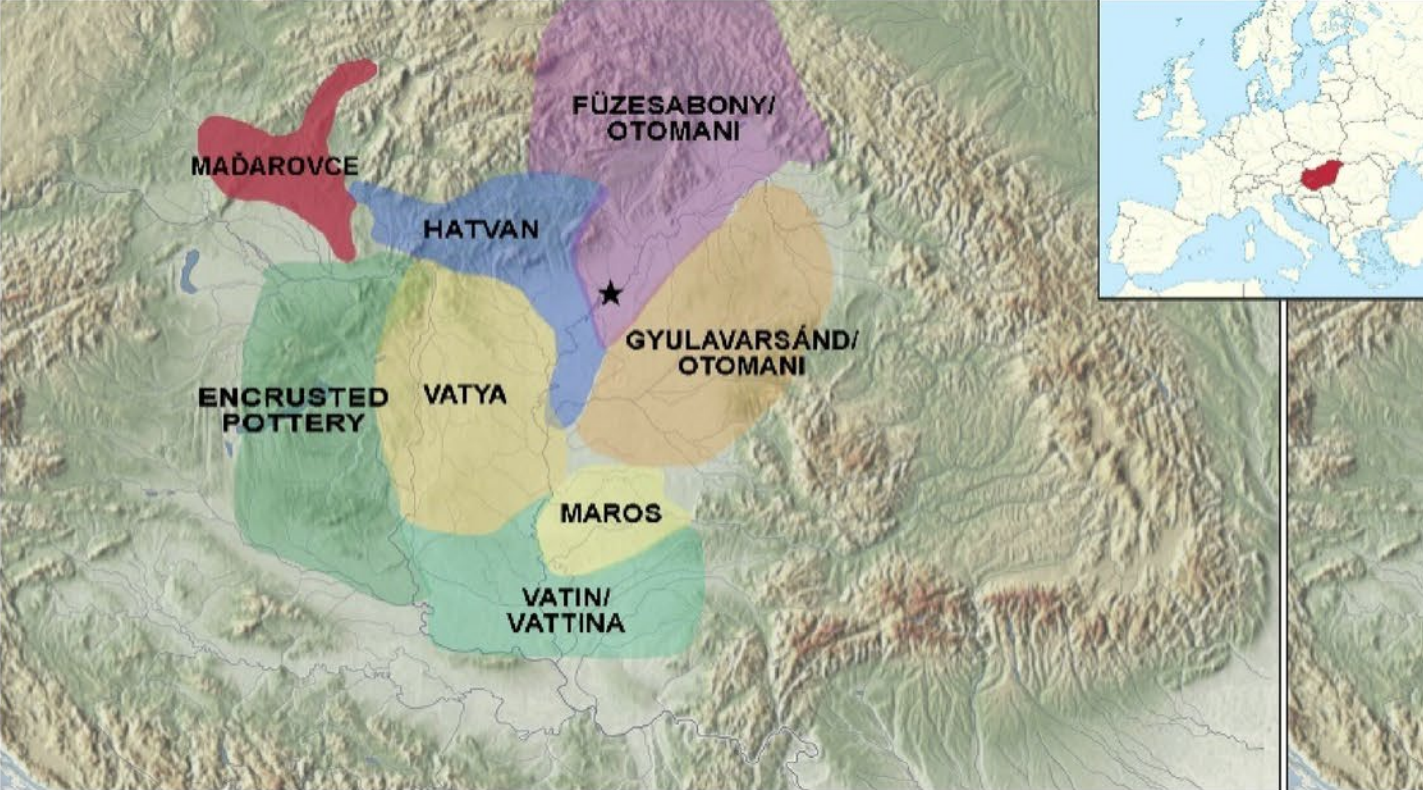
Geographic distribution of Middle Bronze Age cultures in the Carpathian Basin: Ottomány culture, Maros culture, Hatvan culture, Vatya culture, Mad'arovce culture, Encrusted Pottery culture

The Vatin culture (Serbian: Ватинска култура, Vatinska kultura or Ватинска група, Vatinska grupa), also known as the Vatina culture, is a name of a prehistoric Bronze Age culture, which was named after Vatin, a village in Serbia. The culture had Indo-European roots and was culturally connected with Mycenaean Greece. The Vatin culture is dated to the middle Bronze Age and is generally divided into three phases: Pančevo-Omoljica, Vatin-Vršac, and Belegiš-Ilandža. It flourished from c. 2000 BC to 1500 BC, or until the 13th century BC according to some sources.

The people of the Vatin culture inhabited the entire territory of Vojvodina (Banat, Bačka, Syrmia) and many surrounding areas (including Slavonia, Oltenia, Bosnia and Central Serbia). Its core area was in Serbian-Vojvodinian Podunavlje. The remains of this culture were discovered at the beginning of the 20th century near the village of Vatin (Banat region, Vojvodina province, Serbia). However the real importance of this culture was only realised at the end of the 20th century, when the locality of Feudvar near the village of Mošorin was investigated.

== Characteristics ==
Reconstruction of Vatin culture houses at Feudvar, Serbia

The Vatin culture was highly influenced by Mycenaean Greece and had already developed social differentiation within its population. The culture also developed large central settlements, which were surrounded by smaller settlements and farms. Large settlements were economic and social centers, as well as the seats of tribal leaders. These fortified centers had a defensive character and a large number of them existed in the wider area. The thick network of large fortified settlements represents an example of the collective defense of a wide space.

The site of Feudvar in Serbia was an important proto-urban settlement and central place located on the edge of the Titel plateau, above a steep escarpment overlooking the Tisza river and plains below. It consisted of a central fortified tell of 2 hectares, surrounded by an open settlement of up to 6 hectares at its greatest extent. An average of 1000 people are estimated to have lived in the tell itself. There is evidence of craft specialisation, social differentiation and the presence of a ruling elite at the site. Houses were 5-6 m by 10-12 m in size, laid out in a dense rectangular pattern with wide alleys and small squares between them.

The main occupations of inhabitants of the Vatin culture were agriculture and animal husbandry and it is assumed that they also produced beer. In many of the settlements, remains of children's toys were discovered. Tools, weapons and jewelry were mainly purchased by trade, but some larger settlements also had their own workshops that produced bronze objects. One foundry of bronze objects was discovered in Feudvar, and according to the researchers, it was probably used for several hundreds of years. There are indications that people of the Vatin culture also had basic mathematical knowledge.

According to Anthony (2007), chariotry spread westwards to the Vatin culture from the Multi-cordoned ware culture.

== Gallery ==
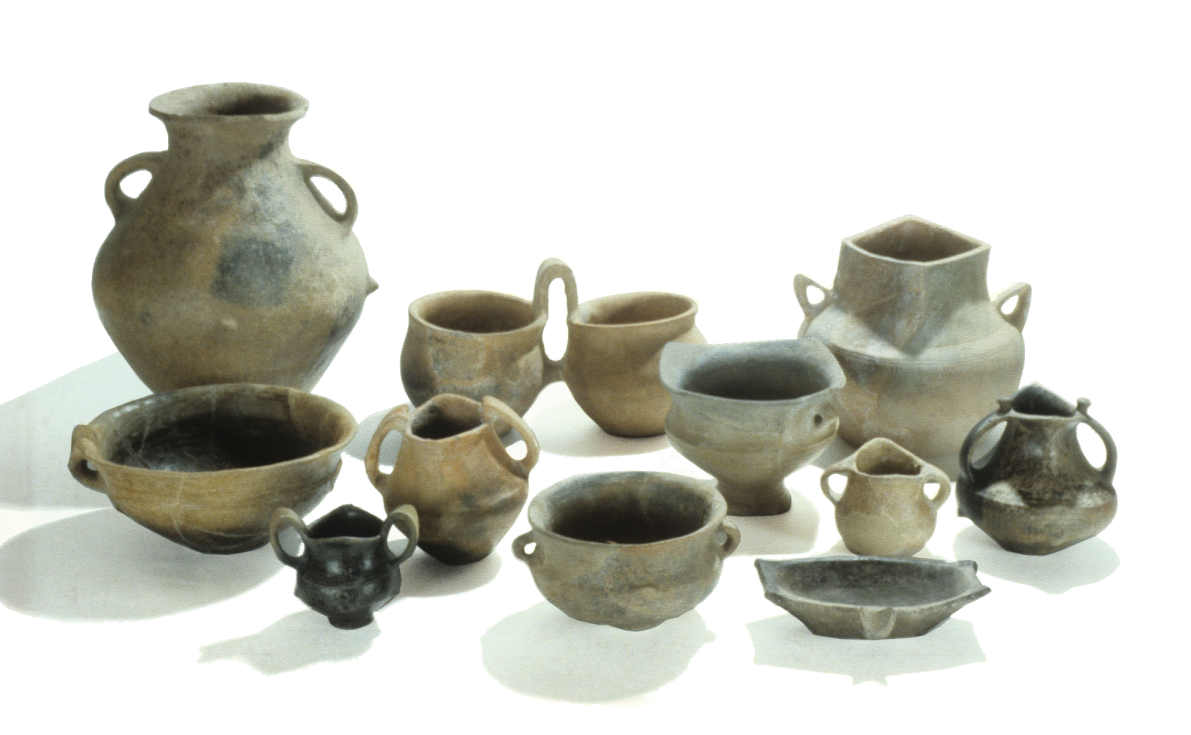
Early Bronze Age (classical) Vatin culture ceramics from Feudvar

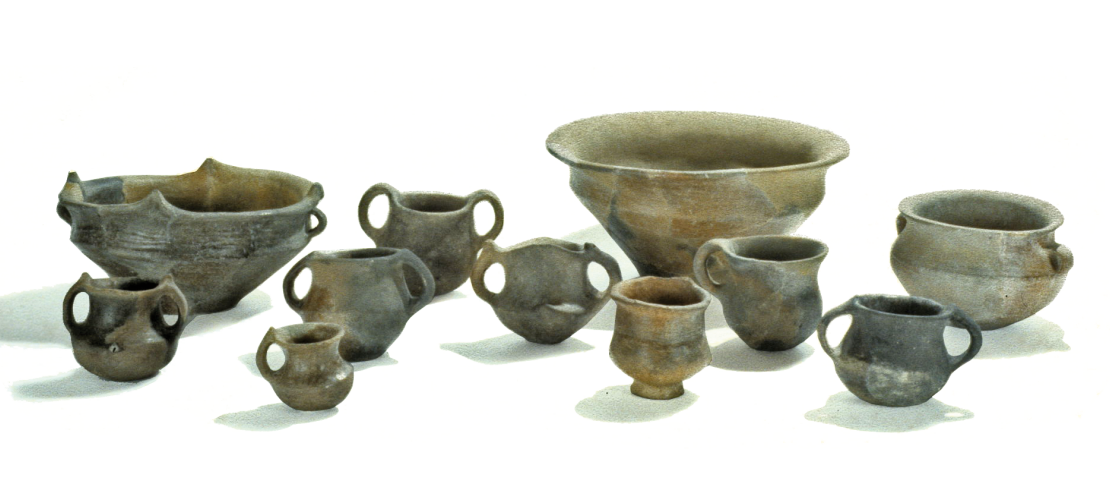
Middle Bronze Age Vatin culture ceramics

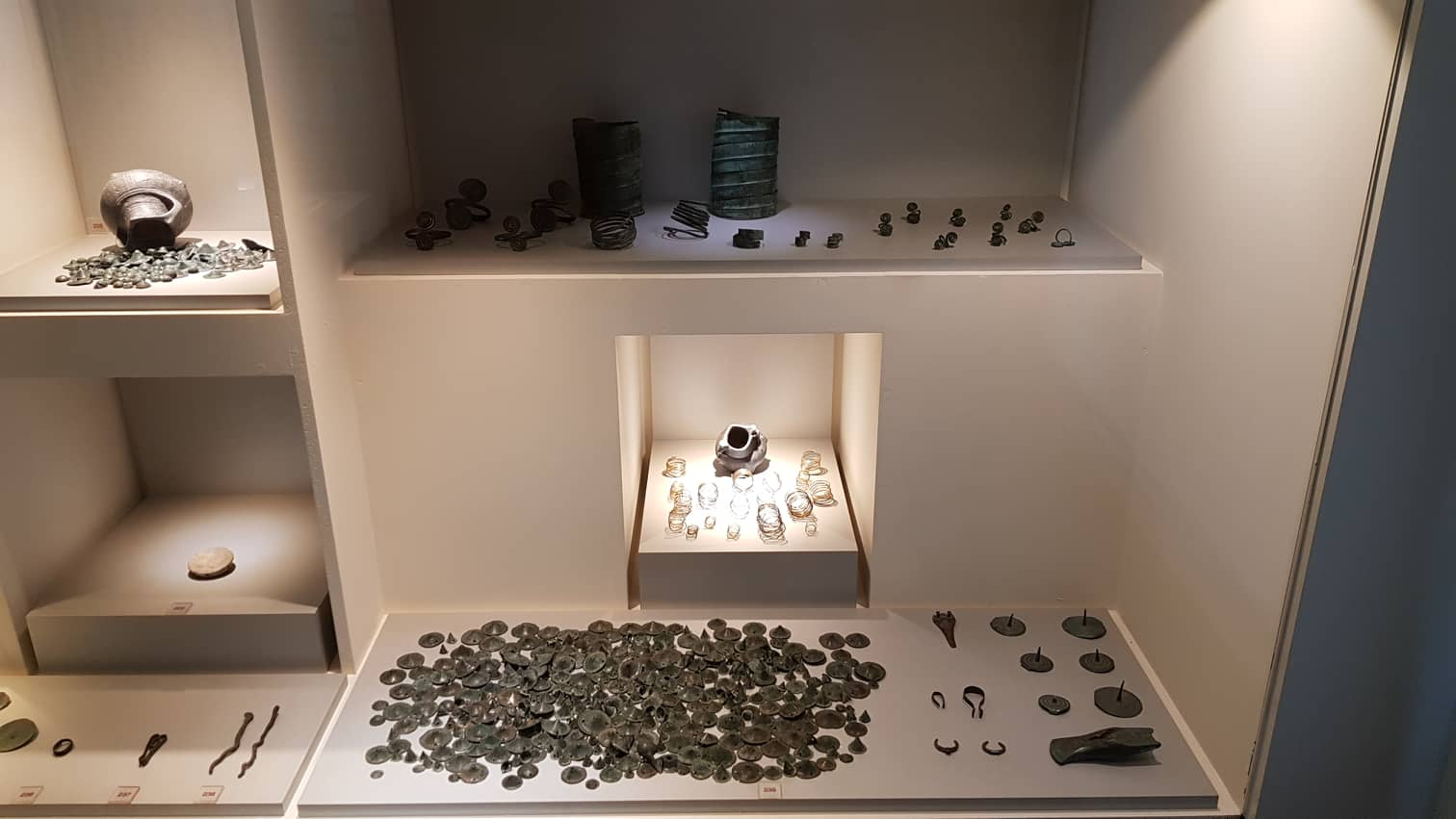
The Lovas Hoard bronze and gold artefacts, Croatia

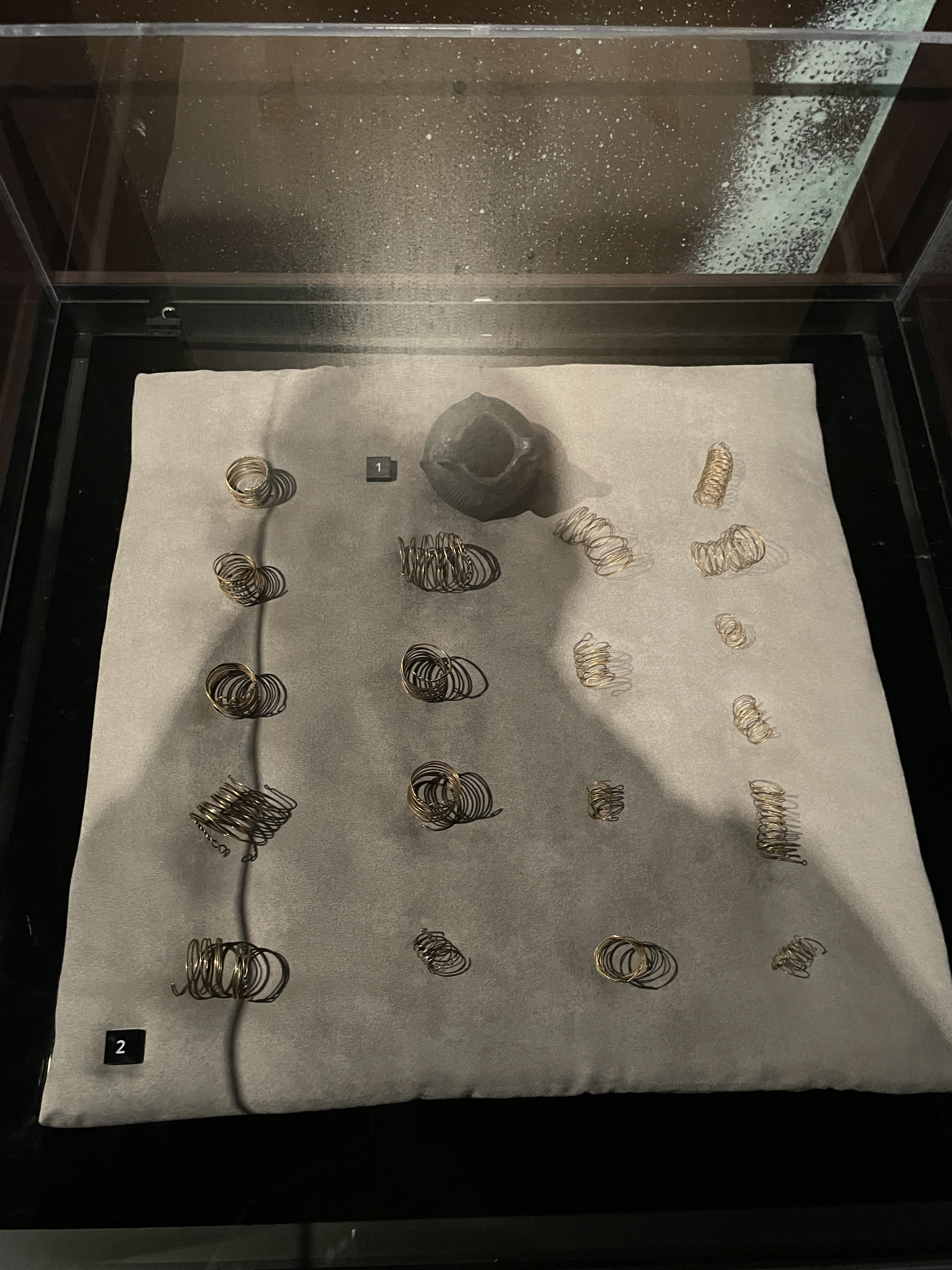
Lovas Hoard gold rings, Croatia

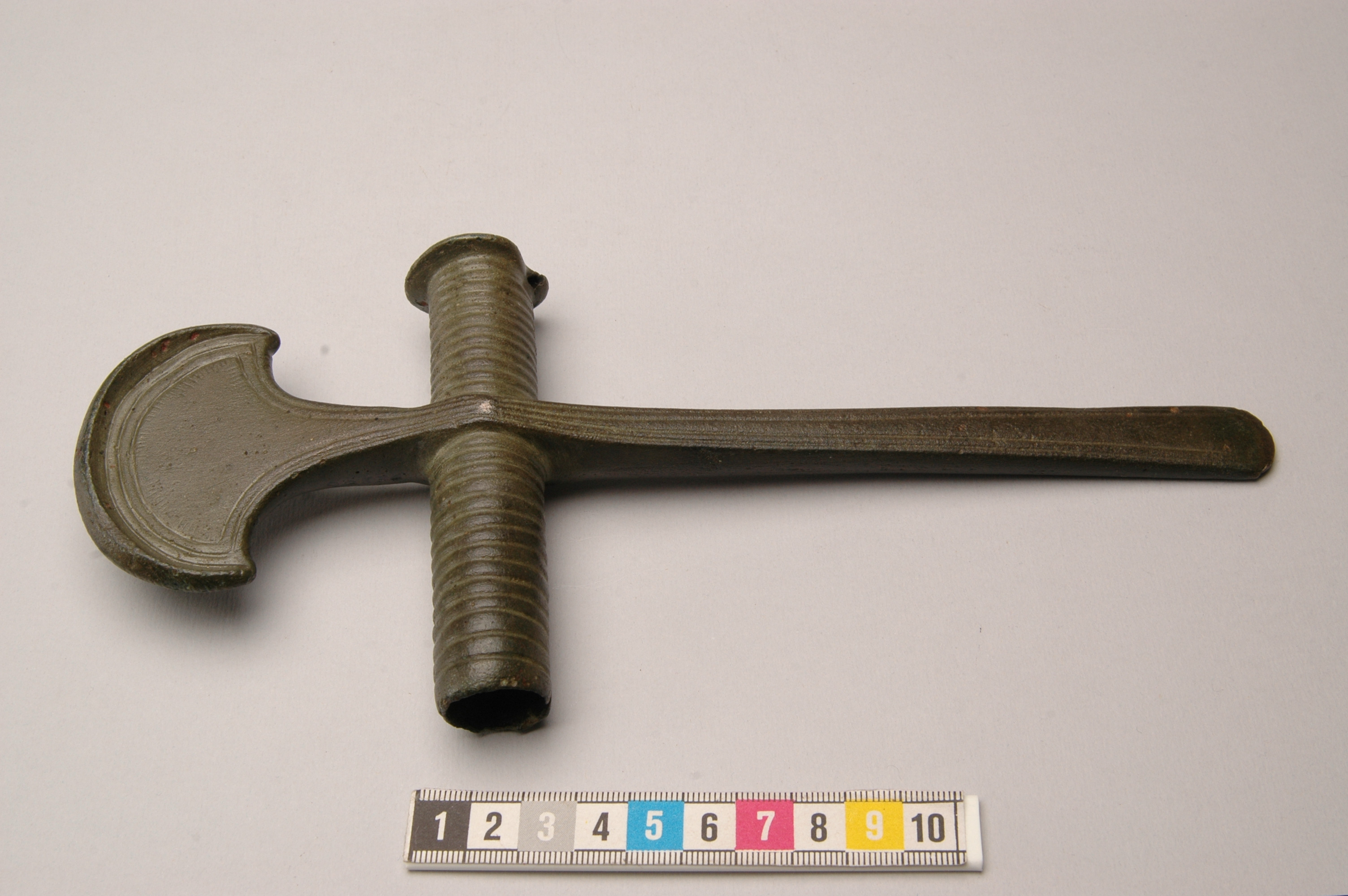
Bronze battle-axe

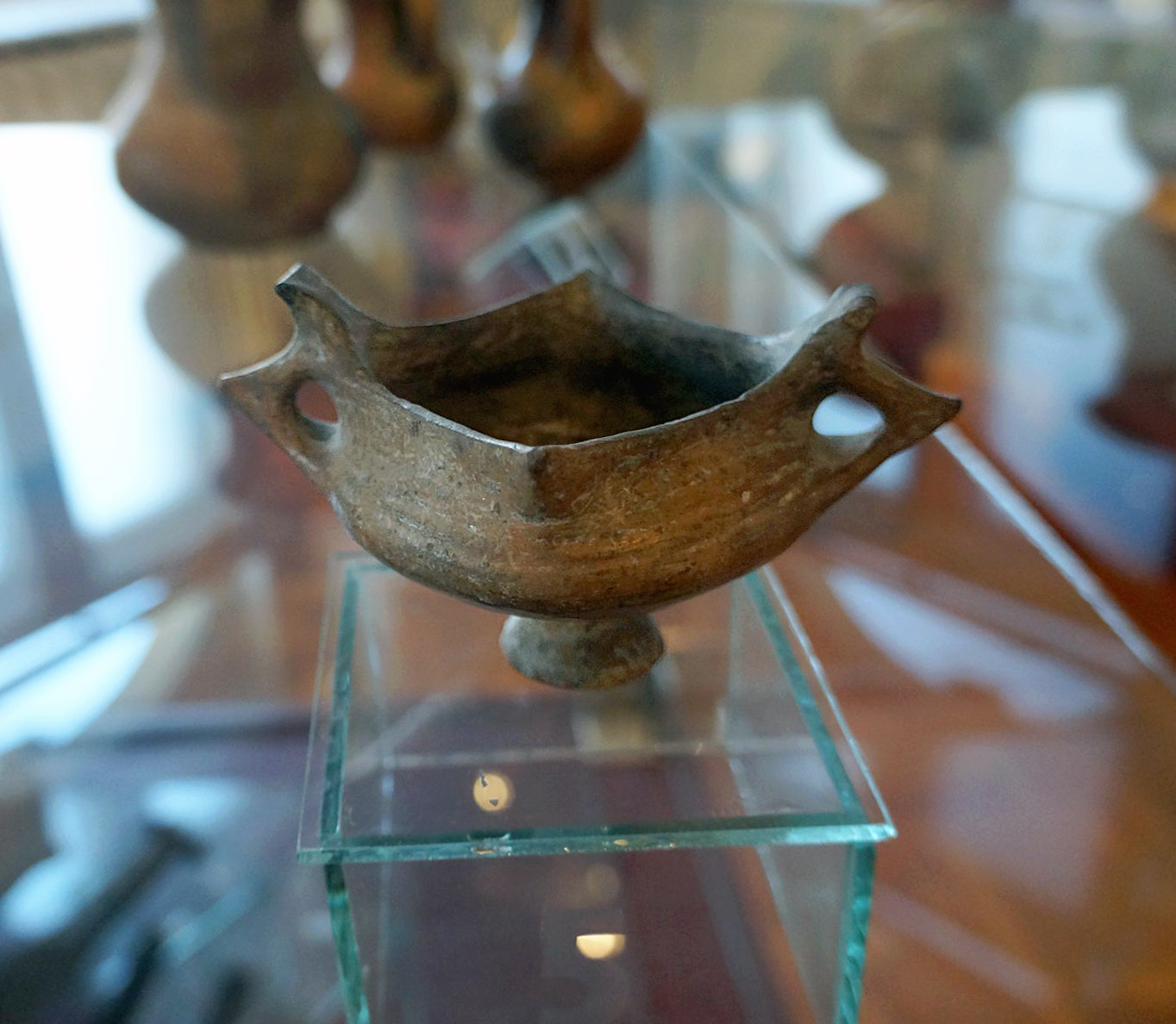
Late Vatin ceramics

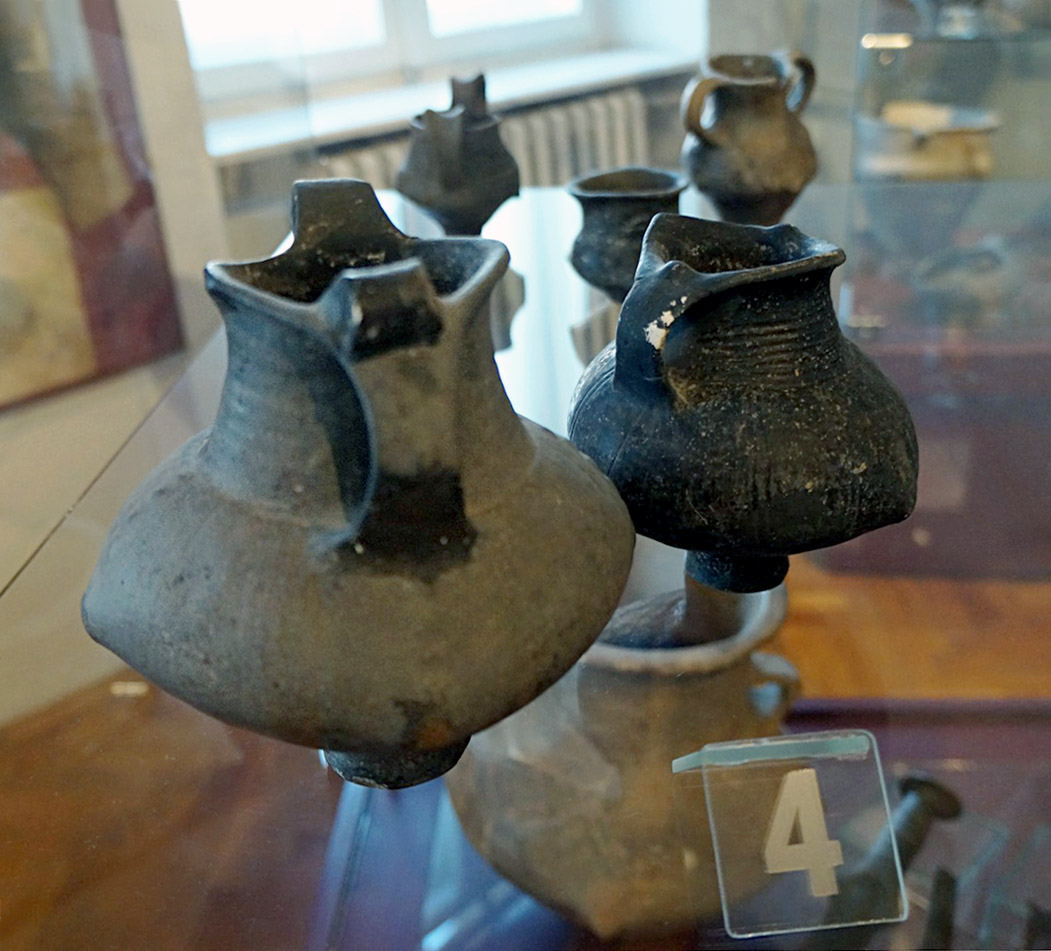
Late Vatin ceramics

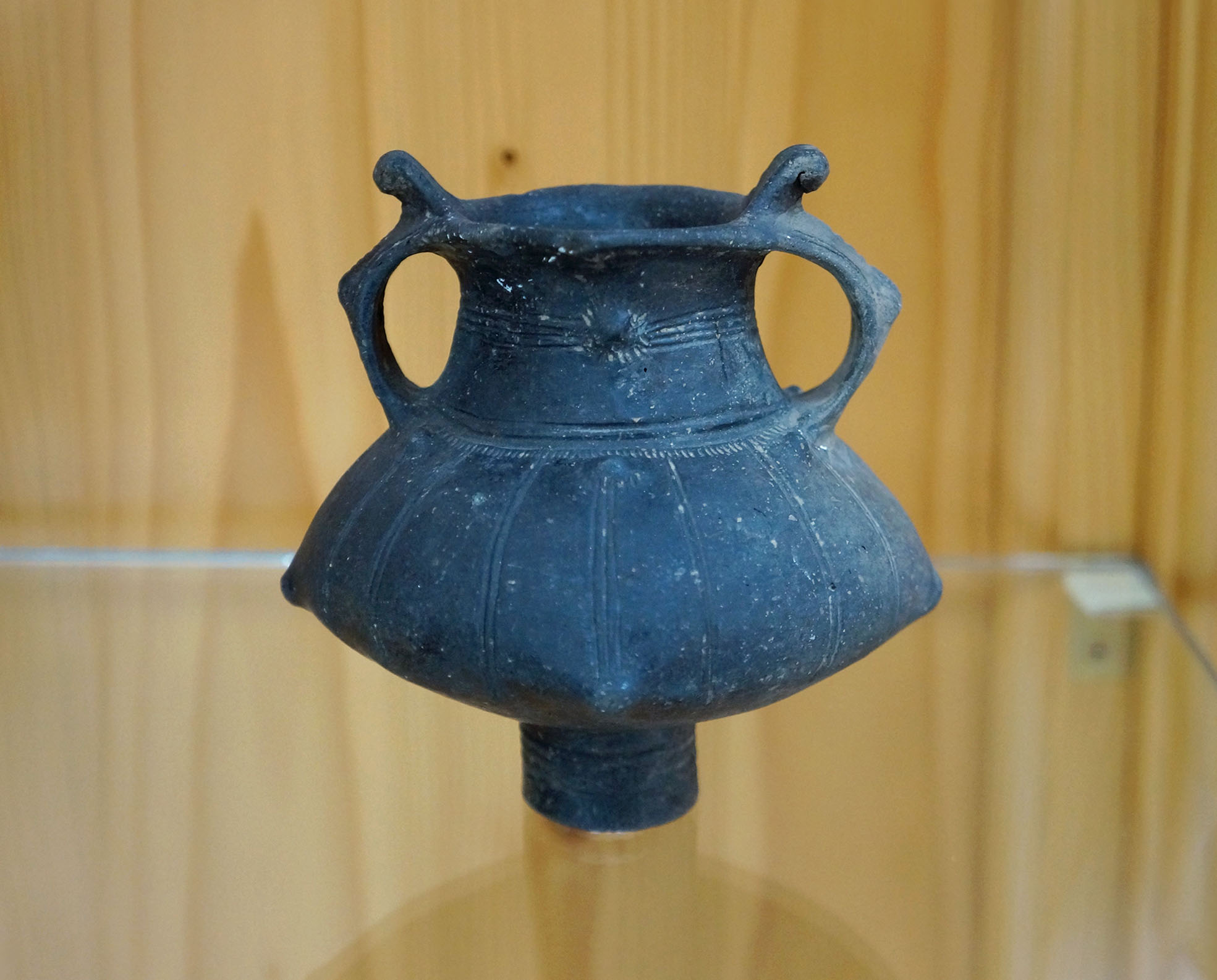
Ceramic vessel

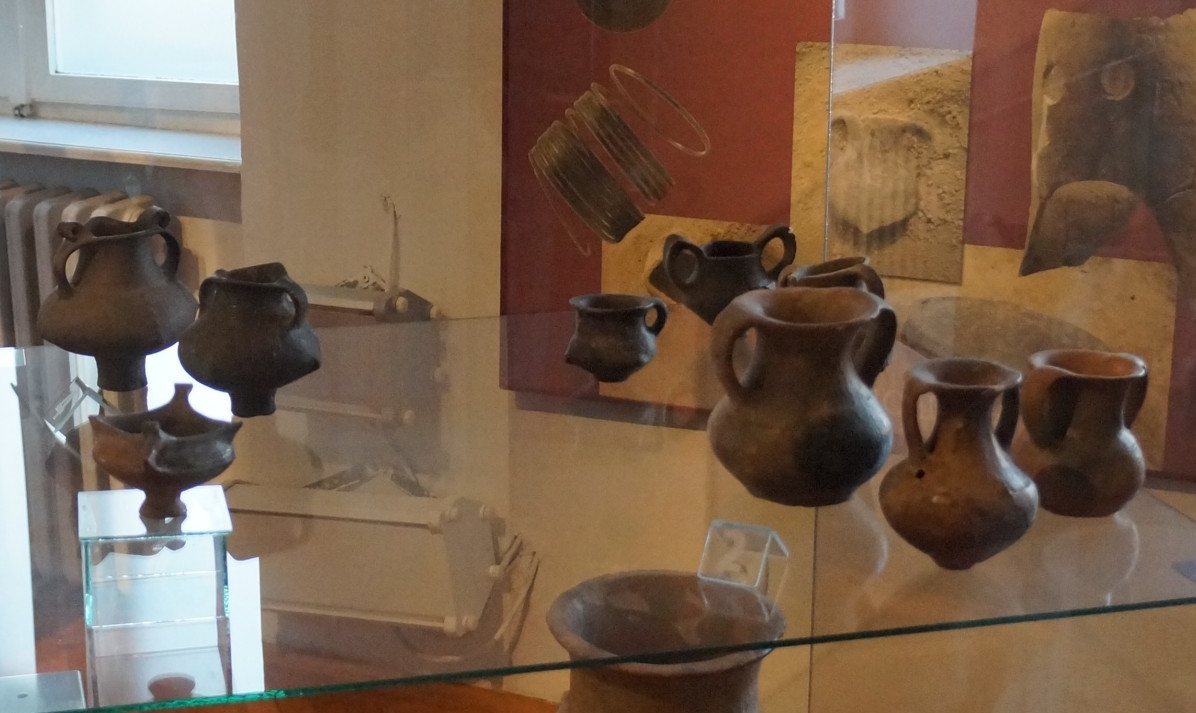
Vatin ceramics

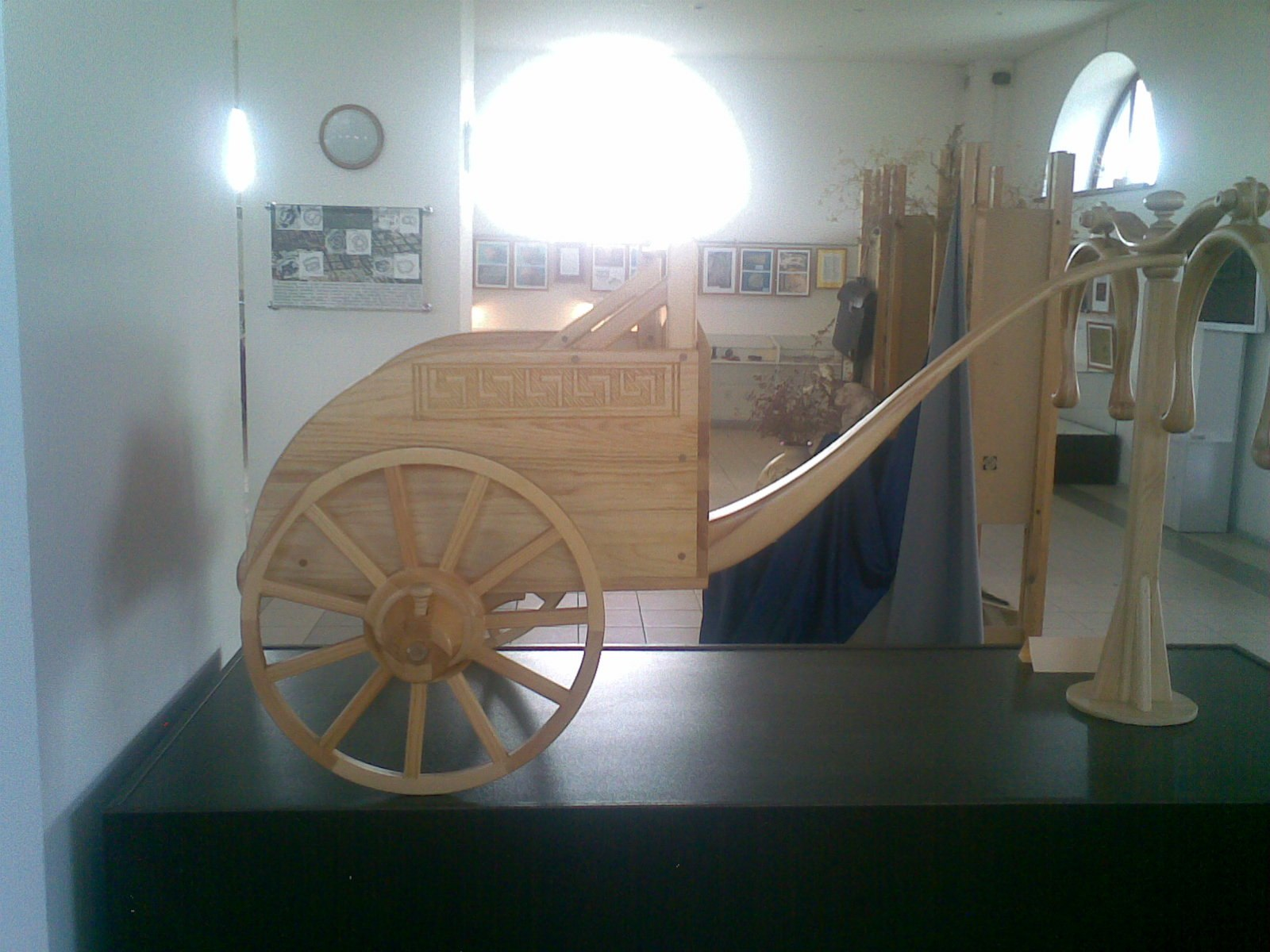
Chariot model, Arkaim museum

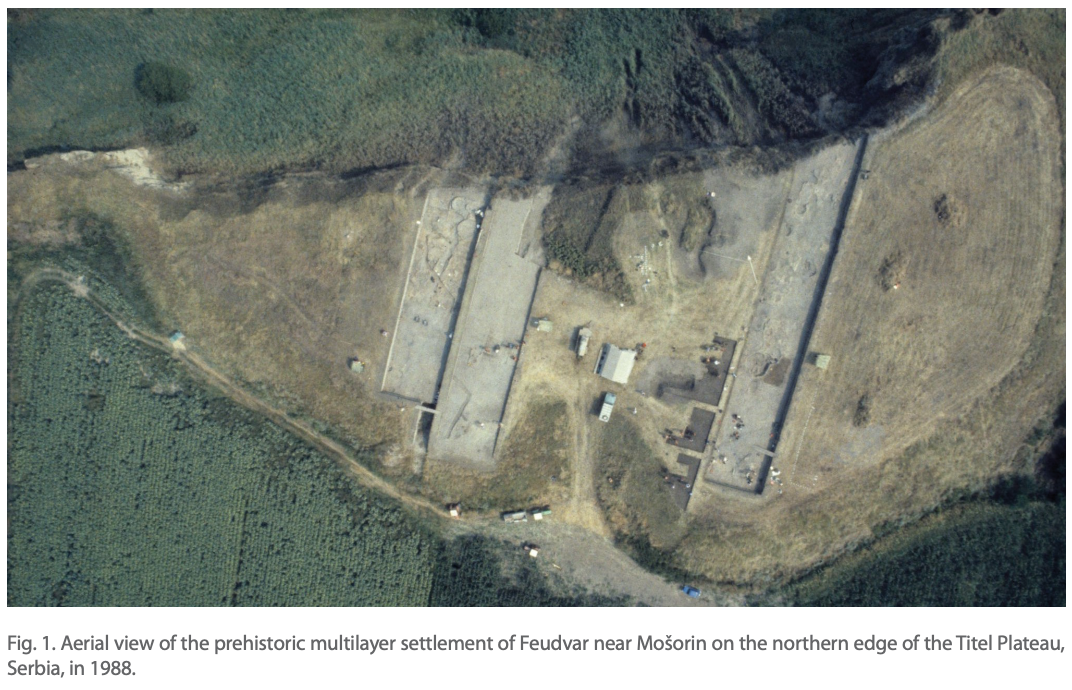
Aerial view of the Feudvar fortified tell site

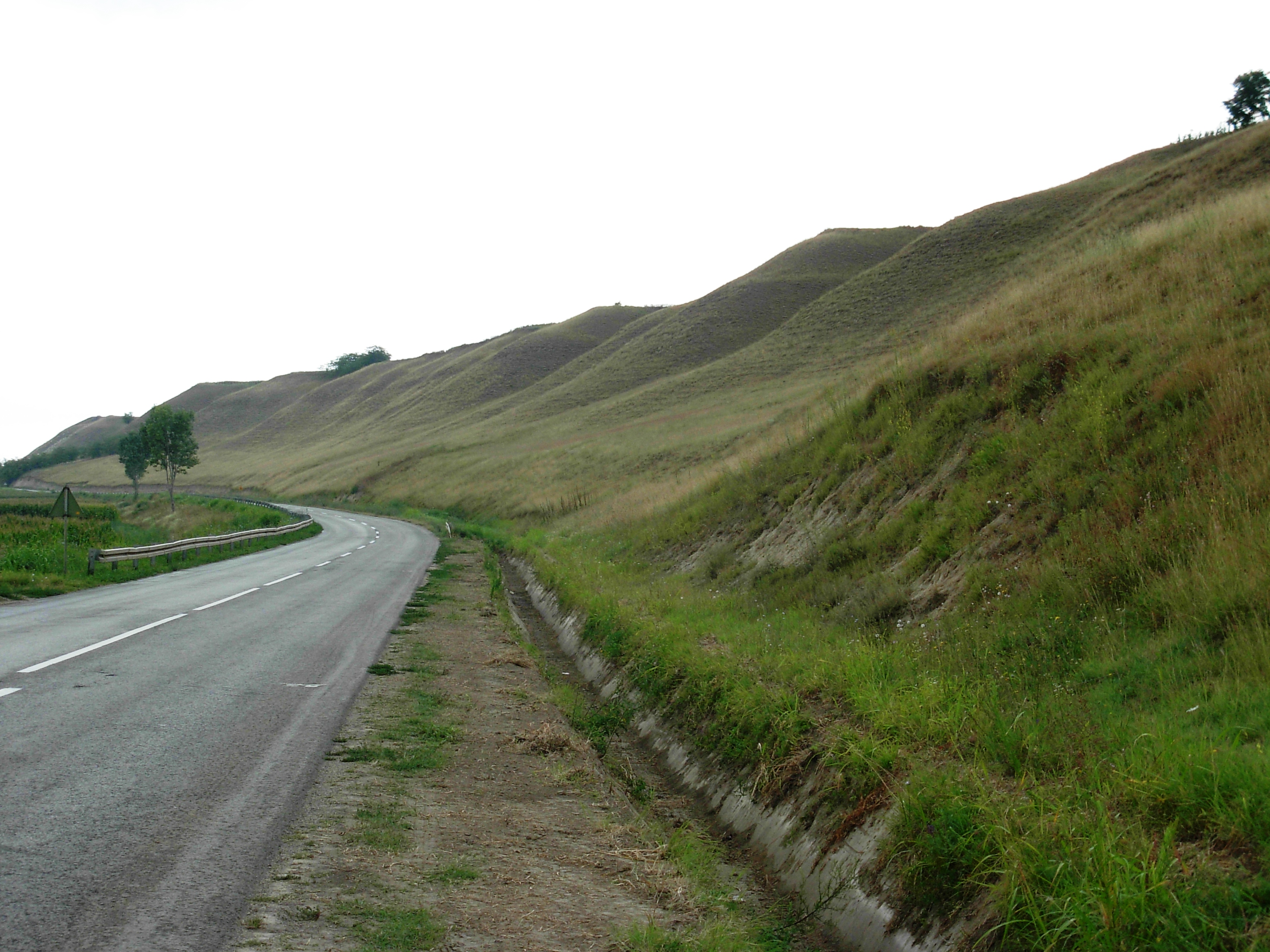
The Titel plateau, Serbia, site of the fortified settlement of Feudvar

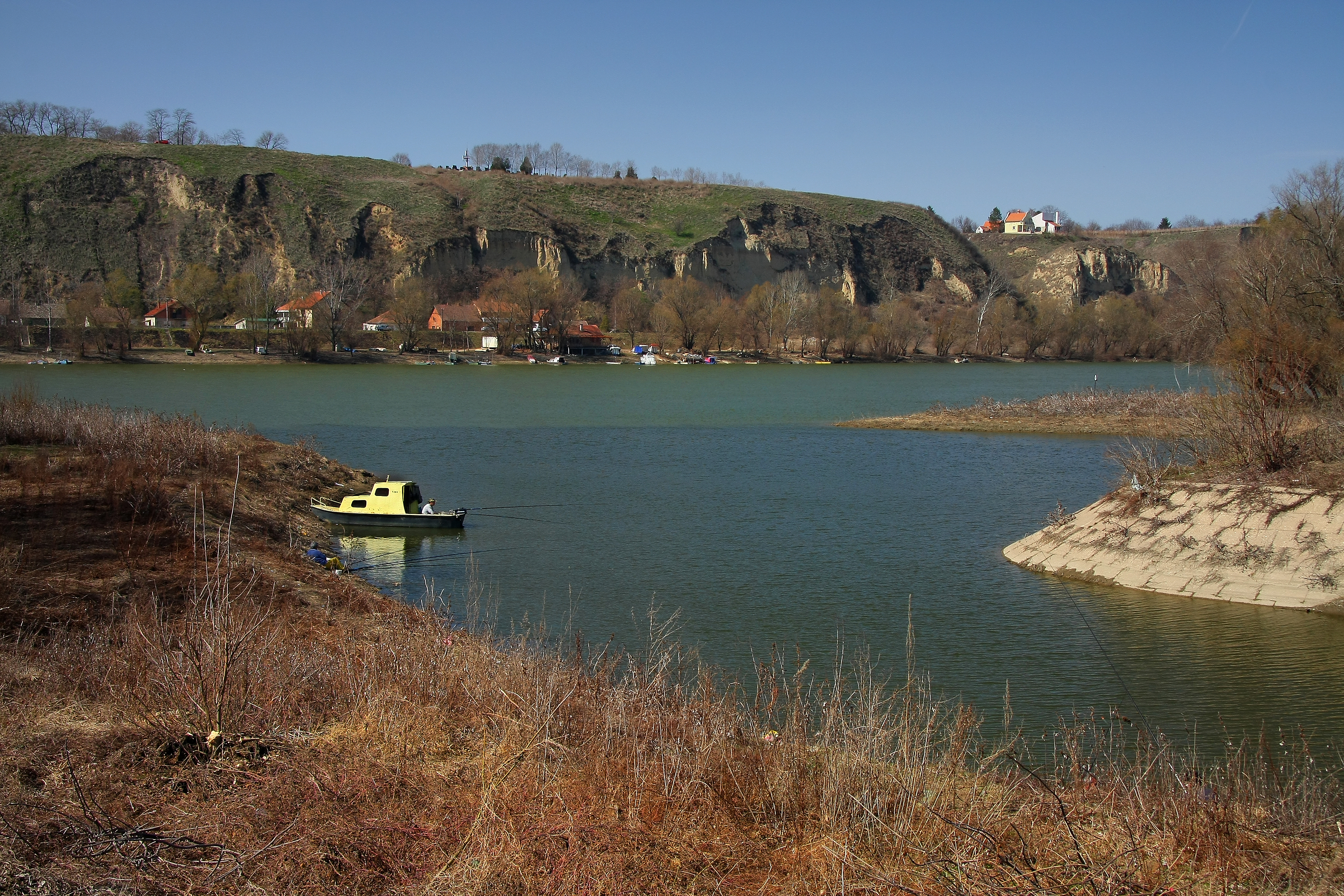
The Titel plateau seen from the Tisza river

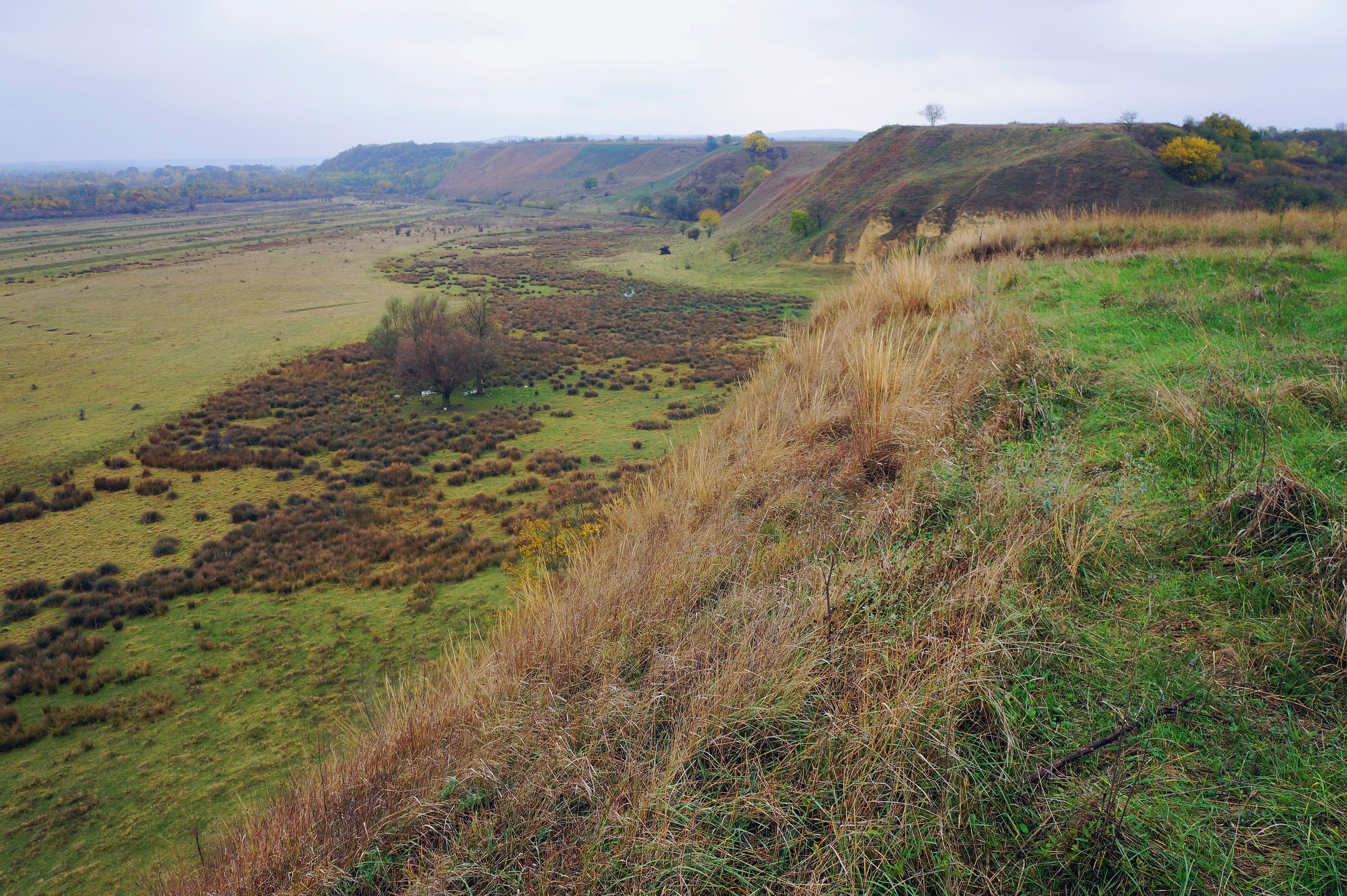
Židovar, Serbia

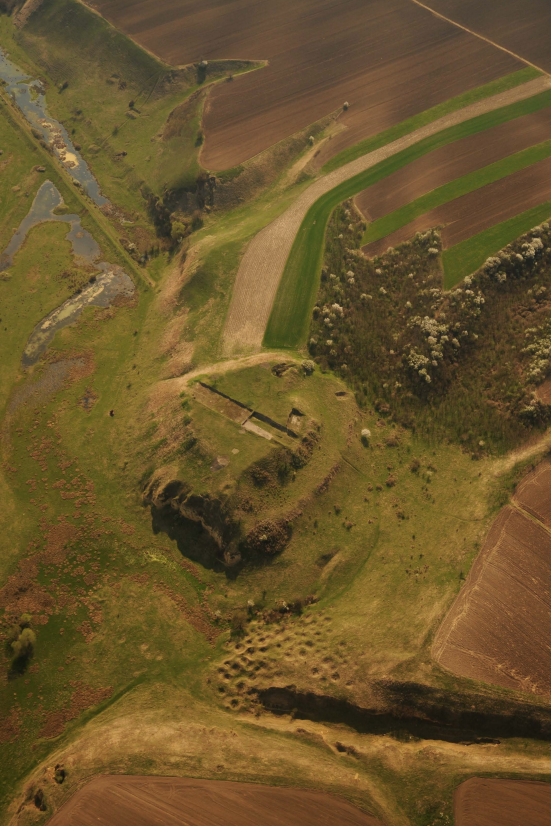
Aerial view of a Vatin culture tell at Židovar

== Localities ==
Localities of the Vatin culture are:

- Belegiš
- Dobrača
- Feudvar near Mošorin
- Gomolava
- Ljuljaci
- Lovas
- Ludoš
- Novigrad na Savi
- Omoljica
- Pančevo
- Popov Salaš
- Sarvaš
- Sotin
- Vatin
- Vinča
- Vinkovci
- Vukovar
- Židovar

== See also ==
- Encrusted Pottery culture
- Hatvan culture
- Monteoru culture
- Nordic Bronze Age
- Maros culture
- Ottomány culture
- Mad'arovce culture
- Tei culture
- Tumulus culture
- Unetice culture
- Vatya culture
- Wietenberg culture
