= Židovar =

Coordinates: 44°56′59″N 21°15′47″E

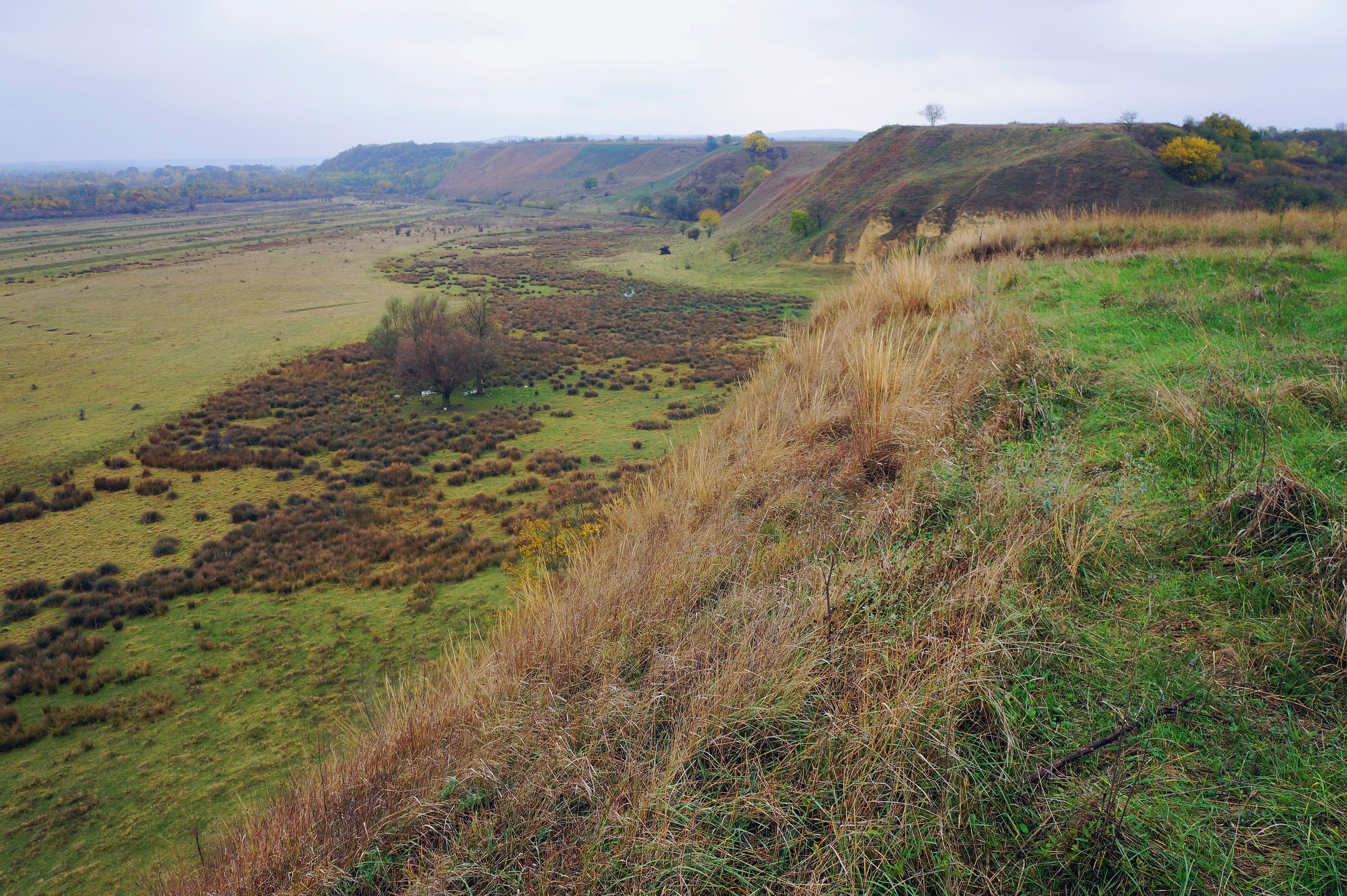
View from the banks of the hill

Židovar is an archeological site and settlement near Vršac, Serbia. This site is famous by the treasure that was found here.

== History ==
The earliest archeological findings date from the early Bronze Age and are followed by Middle Bronze Age relics of the Vatin culture and late Bronze Age remains of the Belegiš culture. The subsequent findings belonging to the early and middle Iron Age Bosut-Basarabi culture date back to the 9th to 8th century BC. Finds of the La Tène era dating from the 2nd century BC until the 1st century AD, mostly pottery, accessories (jewelry, fibulae) and weapons, are mostly the work of the Scordisci. Their more numerous presence after the Celtic invasions in 279 BC, with a significant 10% belonging to the earlier Getae-Dacian cultures, is a result of co-existence and trading between the two peoples. The remains of the Scordisci fortifications with ditch and defense wall impart special importance to the site.

== Treasure ==
Židovar treasure is consisting of over 200 objects made mostly of silver and amber. The silver objects are classified as boxes for valuables, jewellery and toiletry accessories. The three groups are different in terms of their technology of manufacture, style of motifs and function. Chronologically the best definable finds from this hoard are large arc fibulae of the Jarak type. In addition to these fibulae, the jewellery group includes pendants of different forms, two rings made of five-ply wavy filigree wire, and three chains of loop in loop entwined wire, one used for carrying a decorated silver box and the other two for linking pairs of fibulae. The most luxurious part of the hoard are two small lidded cylindrical boxes made of silver sheet and decorated in filigree and granulation technique. Two folding razors and a mirror form the group of toiletry accessories of the Židovar treasure. The sheer amount and diversity of artifacts discovered at Židovar logically indicates that this area was one of the key centers for the production of Balkan Celtic jewelry in the late Iron Age.

In 1990, Židovar was added to the list of Archaeological Sites of Exceptional Importance under the protection of the Republic of Serbia.

== Gallery ==
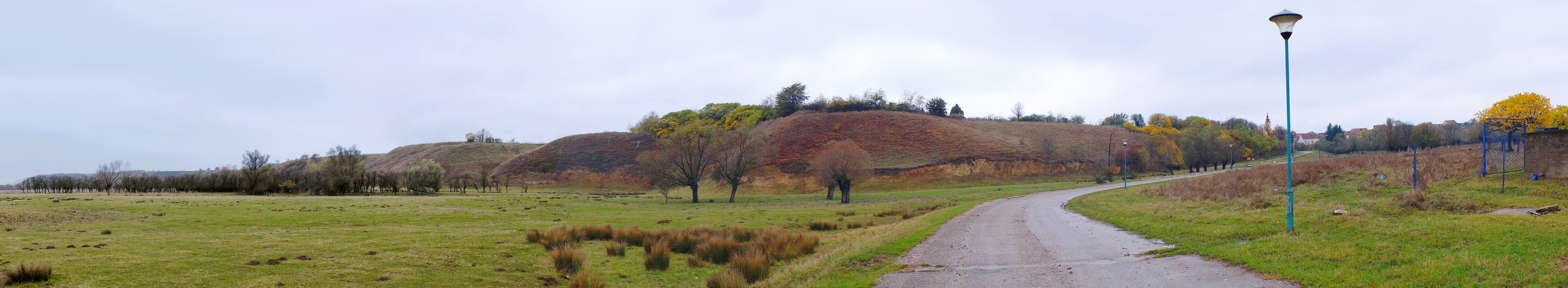
View of Židovar

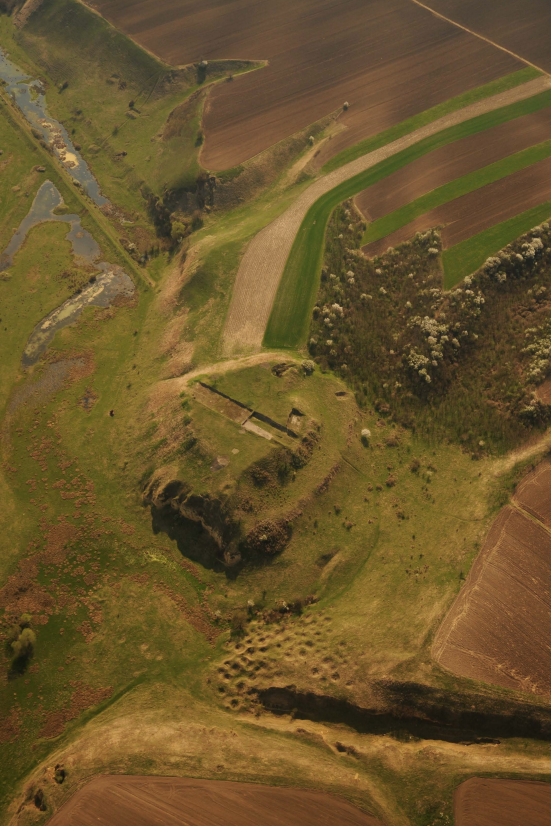
Aerial view of a Vatin culture tell at Židovar

== See also ==
- Archaeological Sites of Exceptional Importance
