= Belegiš =

Belegiš Белегиш (Serbian)
- Village (Selo)
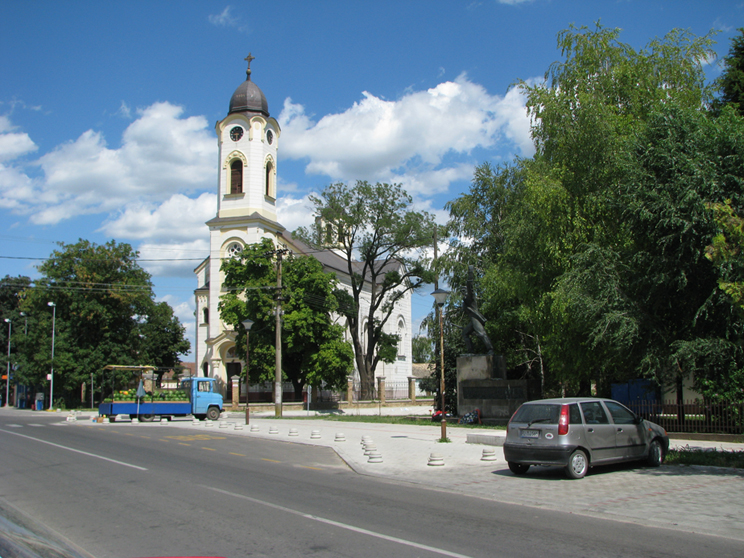
- The Orthodox church.

- Location within Vojvodina Location within Serbia Location within Europe
- Coordinates: 45°01′N 20°20′E
- Country: Serbia
- Province: Vojvodina
- Region: Syrmia
- District: Srem
- Municipality: Stara Pazova

Population (2011)
  - Total: 2,973
- Time zone: UTC+1 (CET)
  - Summer (DST): UTC+2 (CEST)

Belegiš (Serbian Cyrillic: Белегиш) is a village in Serbia. It is situated in the Stara Pazova municipality, in the Srem District, Vojvodina province. The village has a Serb ethnic majority and its population numbering 3,116 people (2002 census).

== History ==
A Bronze Age Somogyvár-Vinkovci culture (Vatin culture) necropolis was found in Grac, with ceramics.

== Cruceni-Belegiš culture ==
The Bronze Age Cruceni-Belegiš culture was part of the south-east European Urnfield culture. It was preceded by the Vatin culture.

=== Bronze Age finds ===
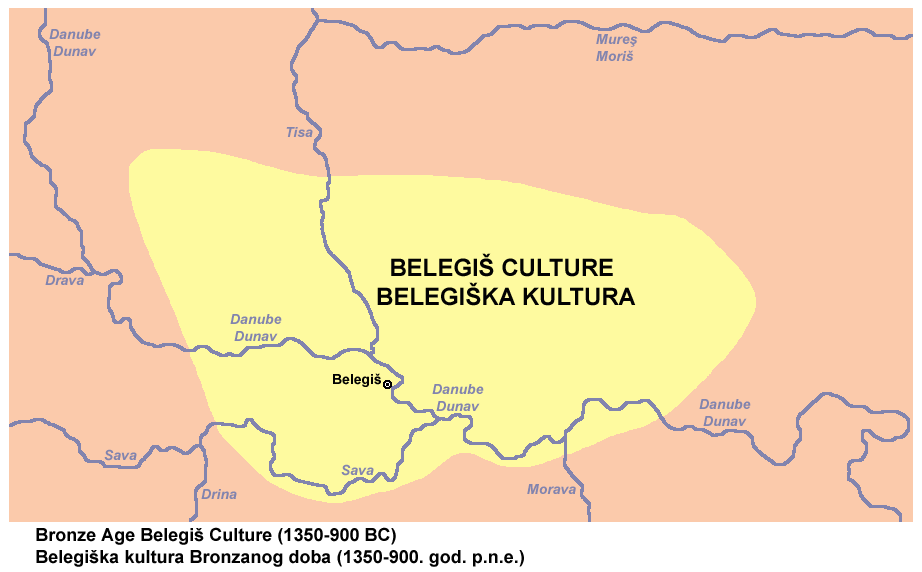
Area of the Bronze Age Belegiš culture, c. 1350-900 BC

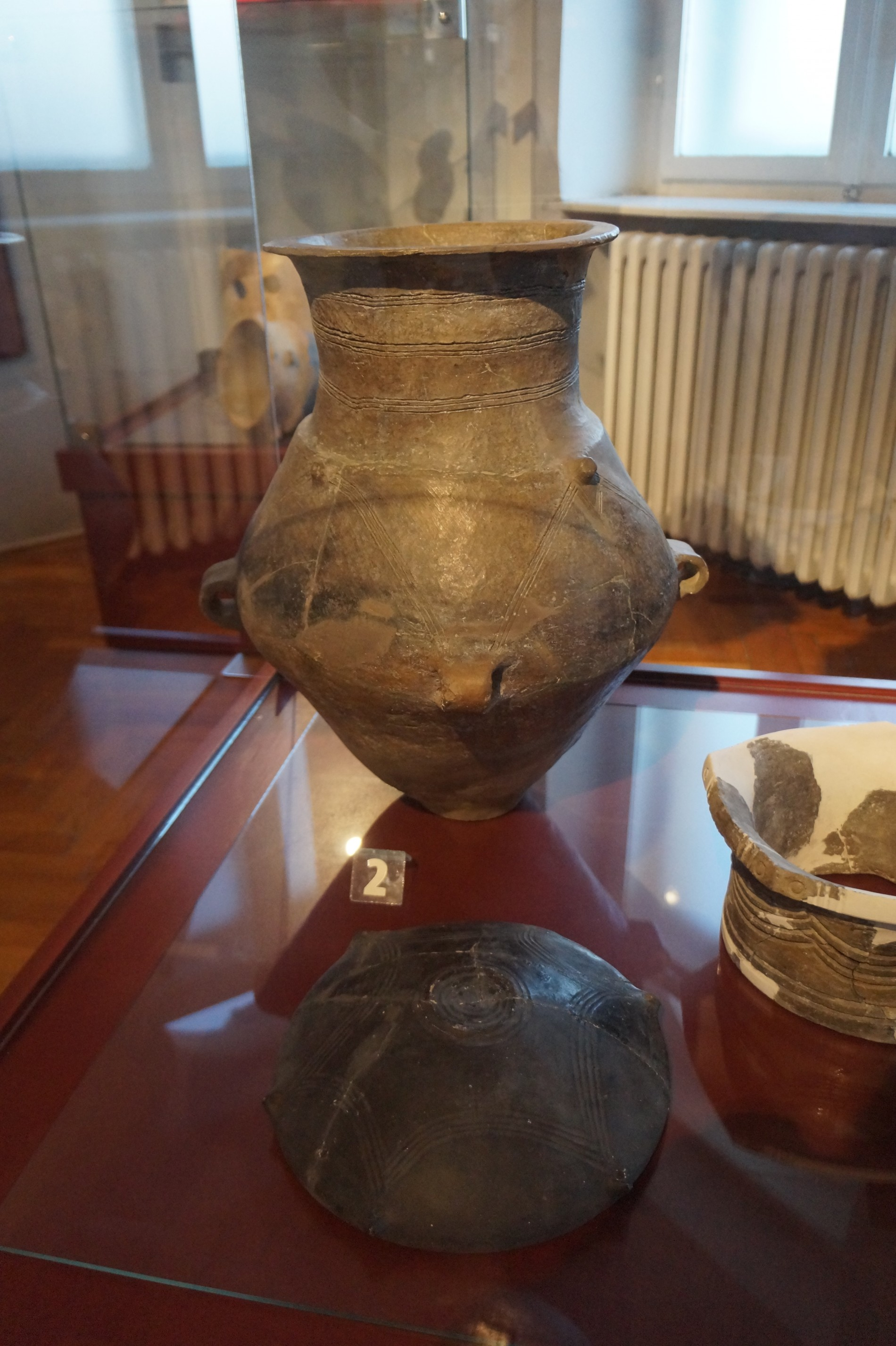

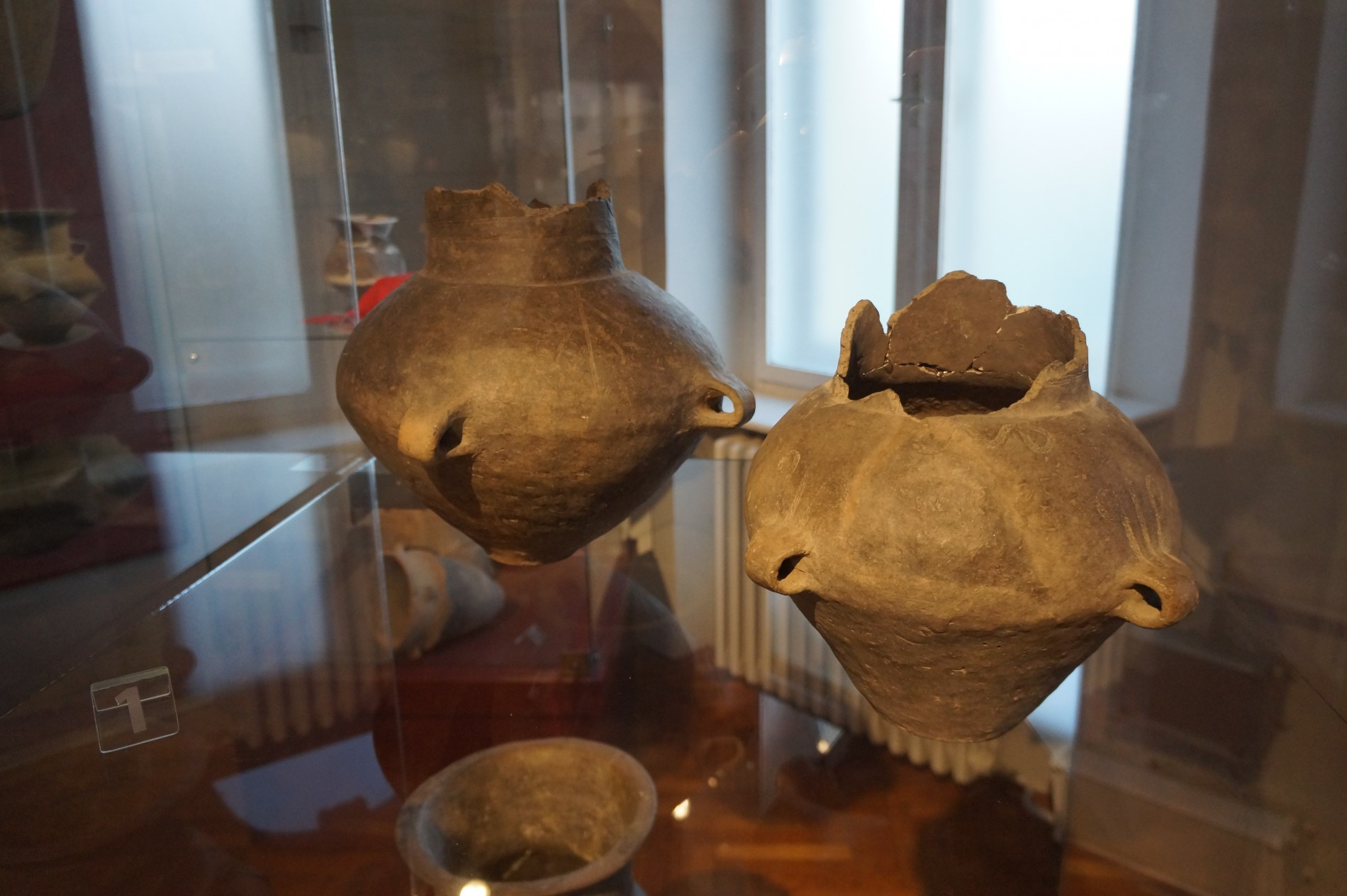

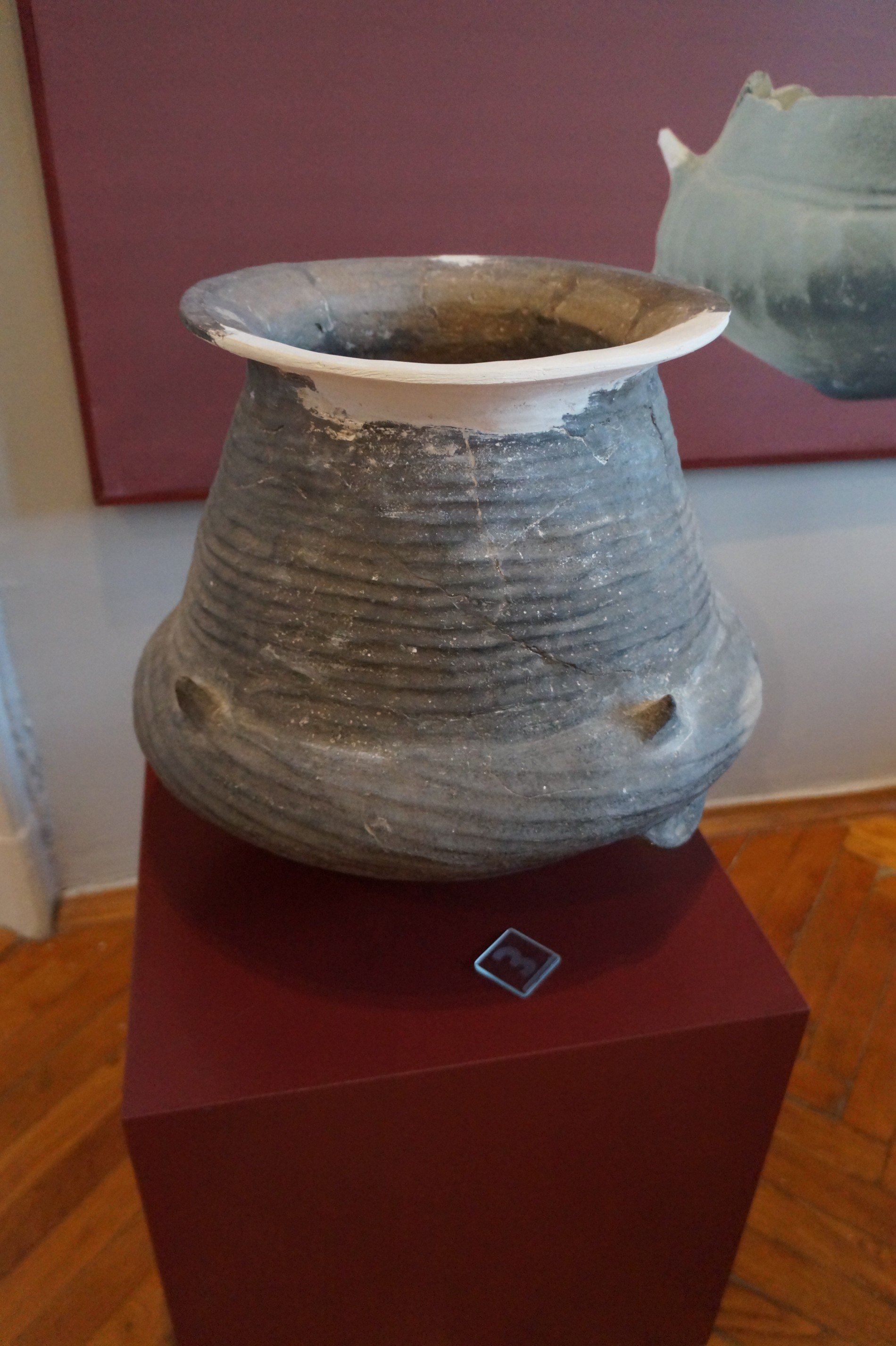

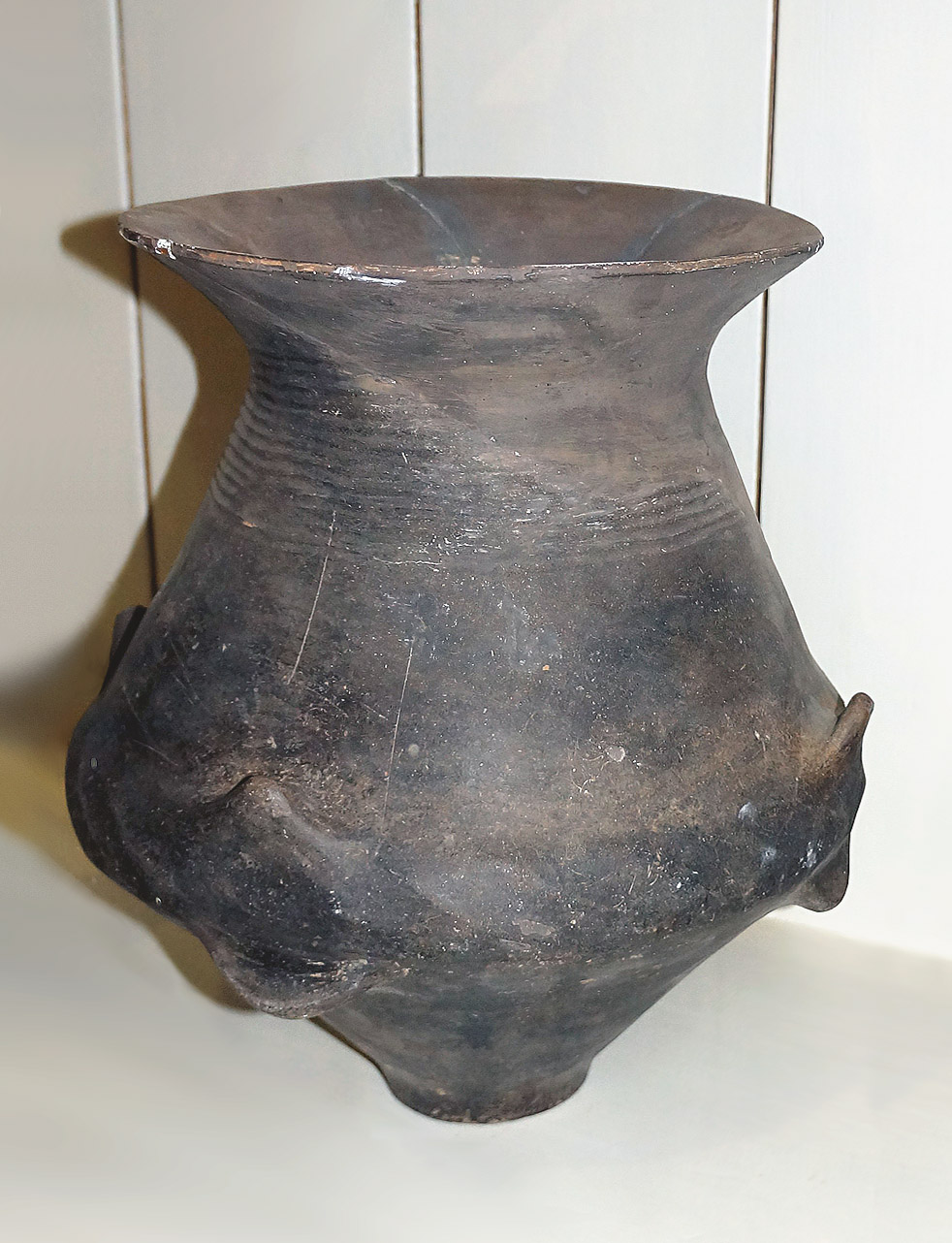

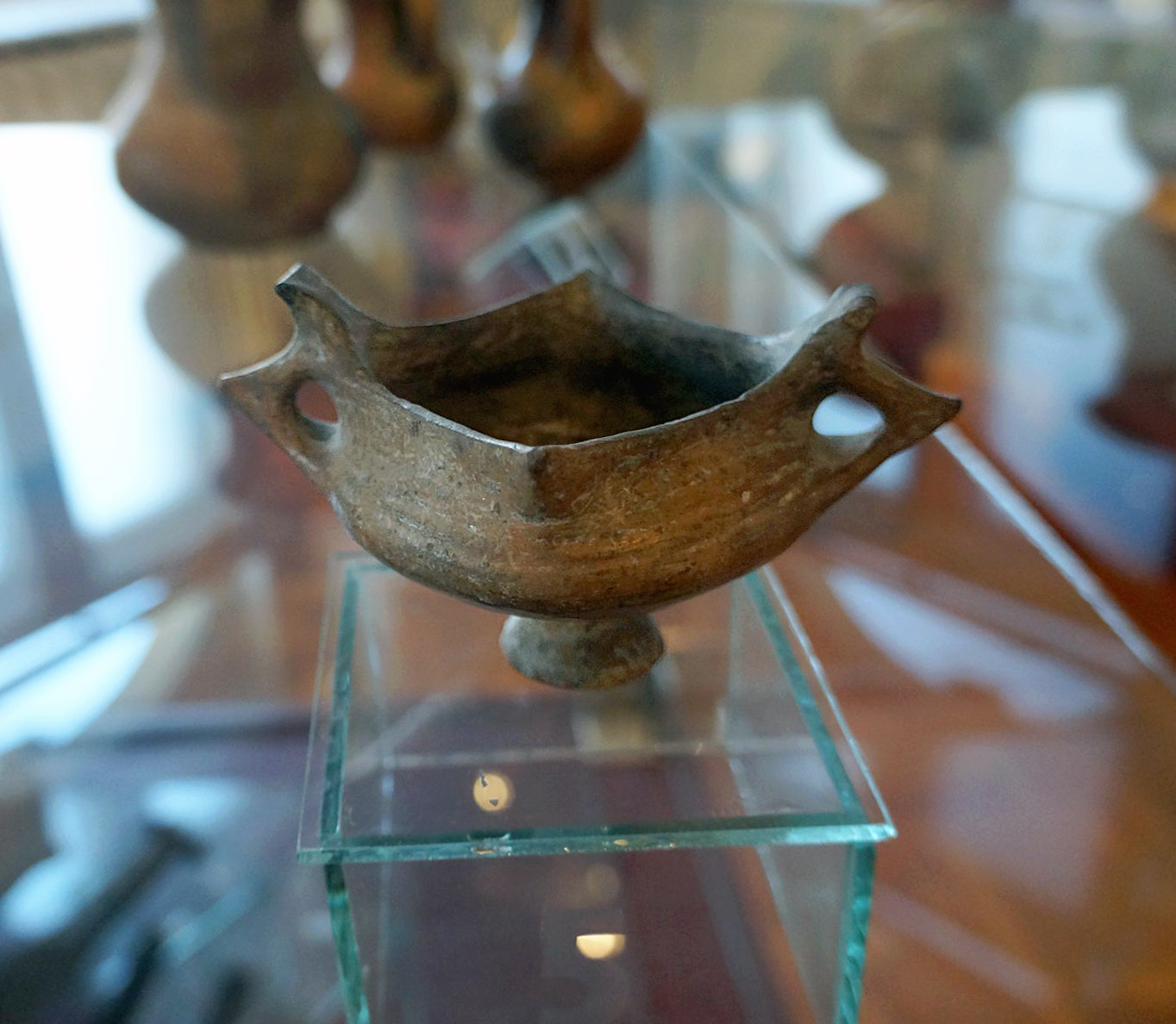
Belegis I/Vatin ceramic vessel

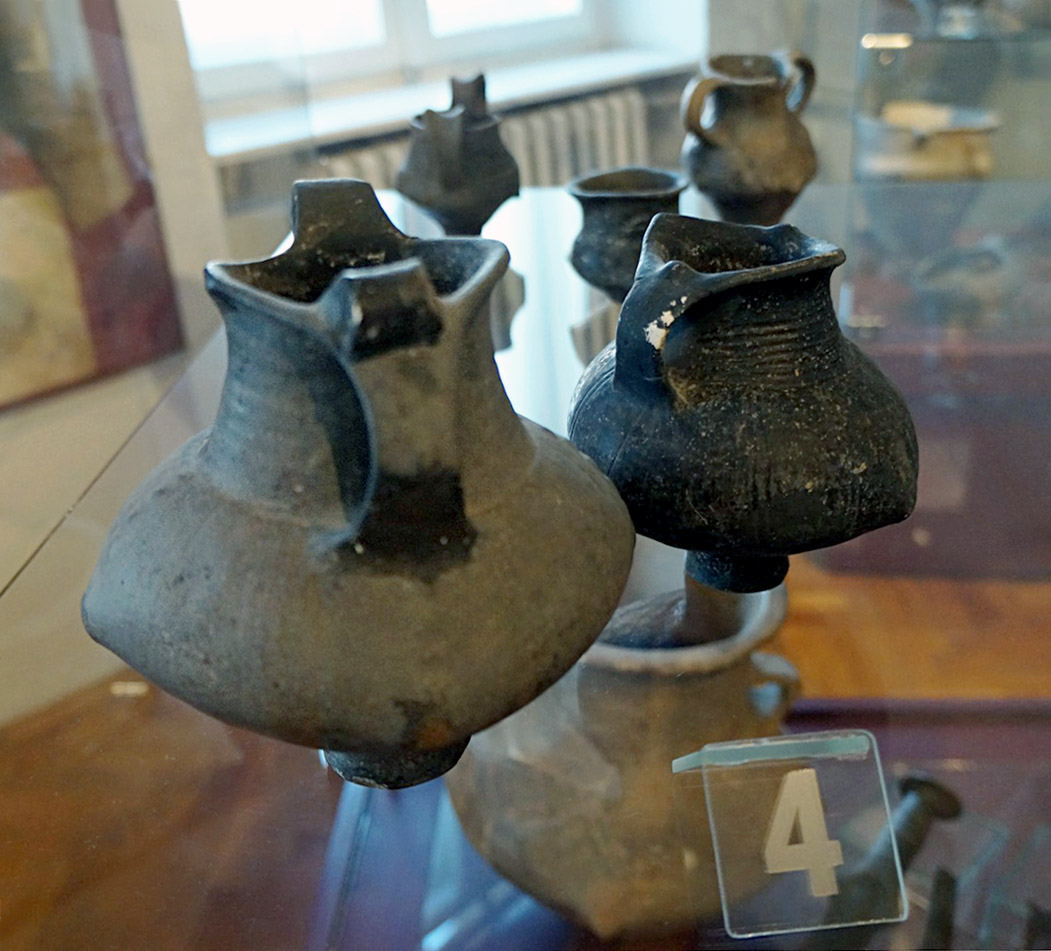
Belegis I/Vatin ceramics

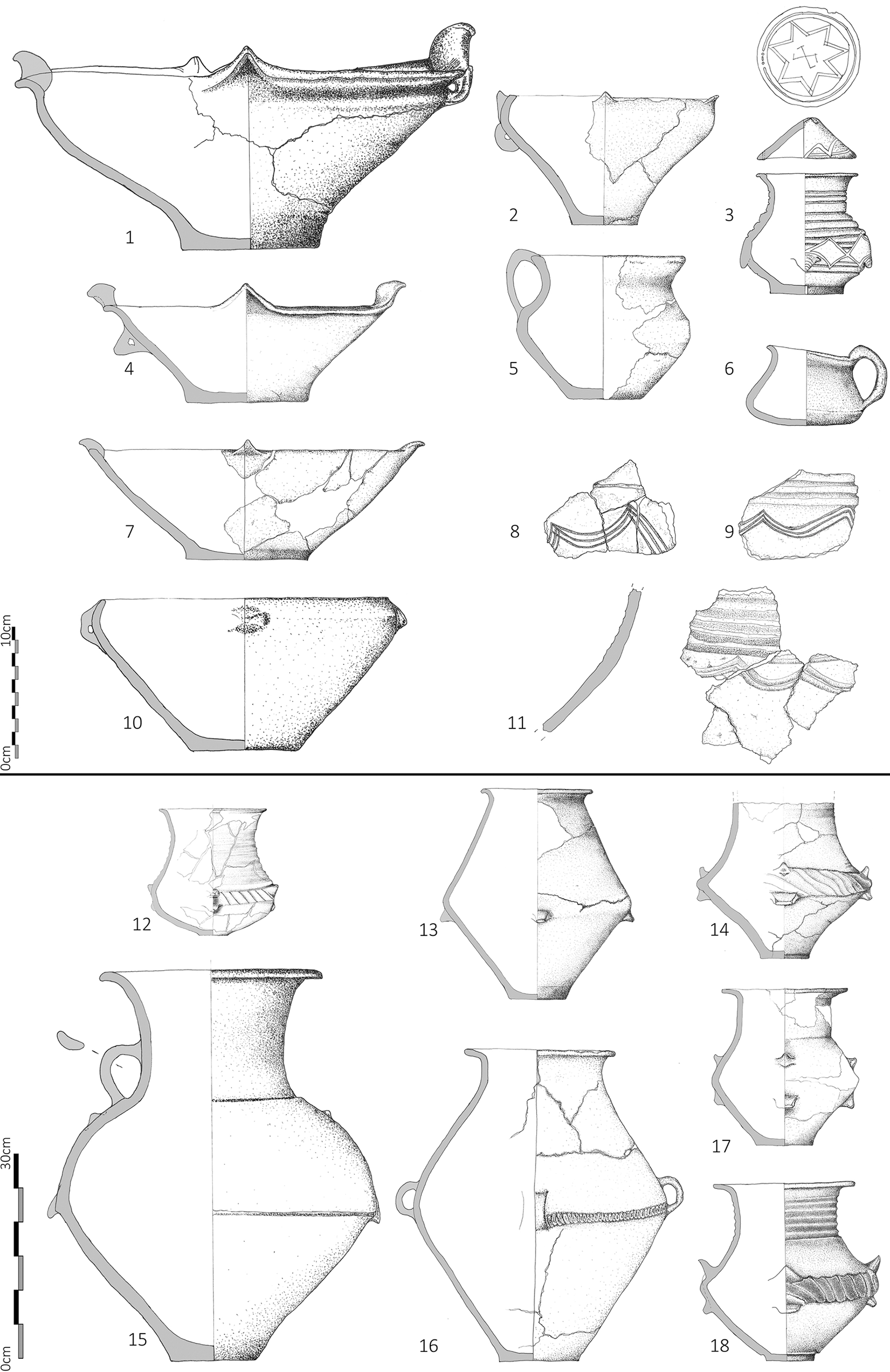
Belegis culture pottery

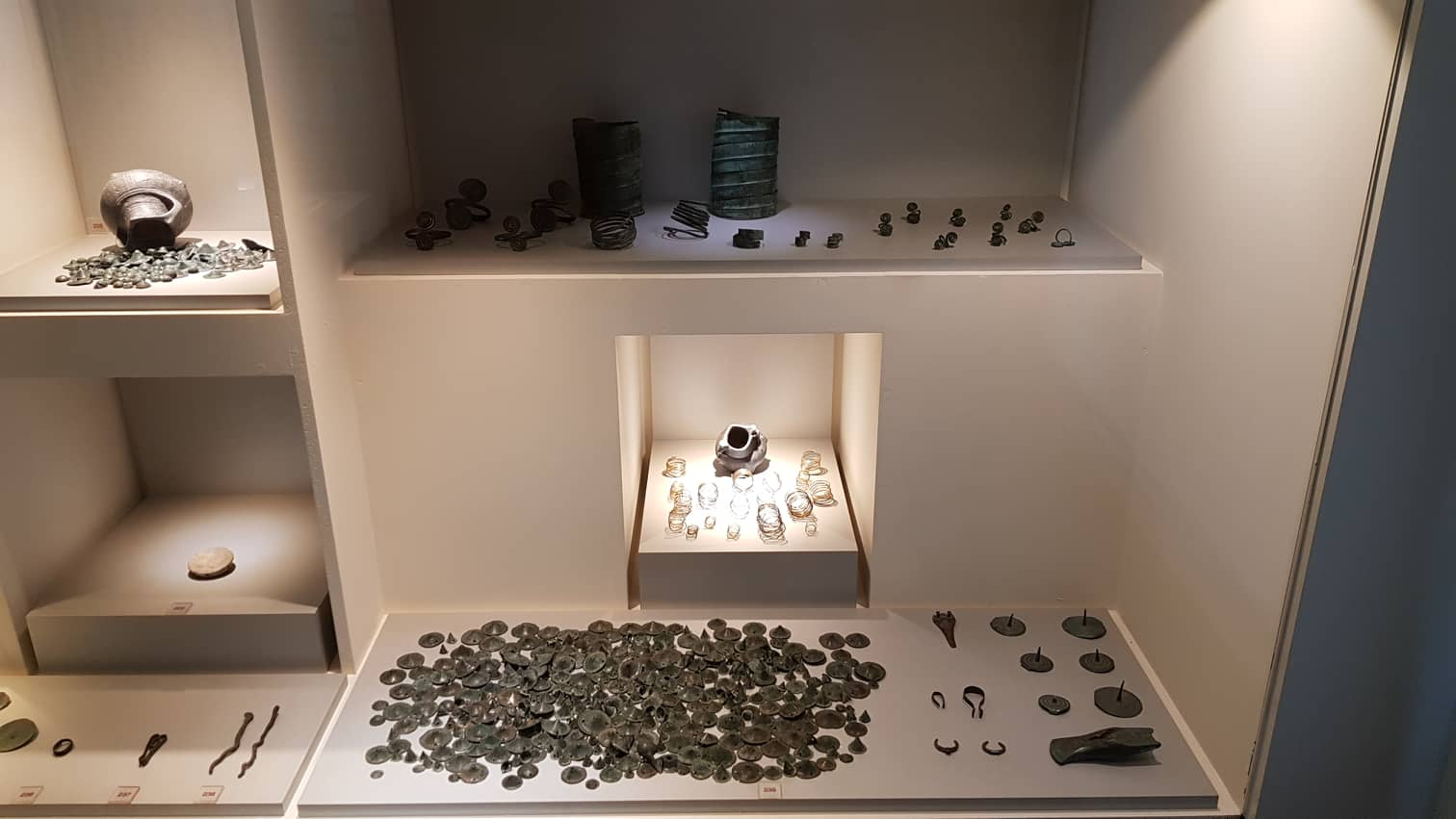
The Lovas Hoard bronze and gold artefacts

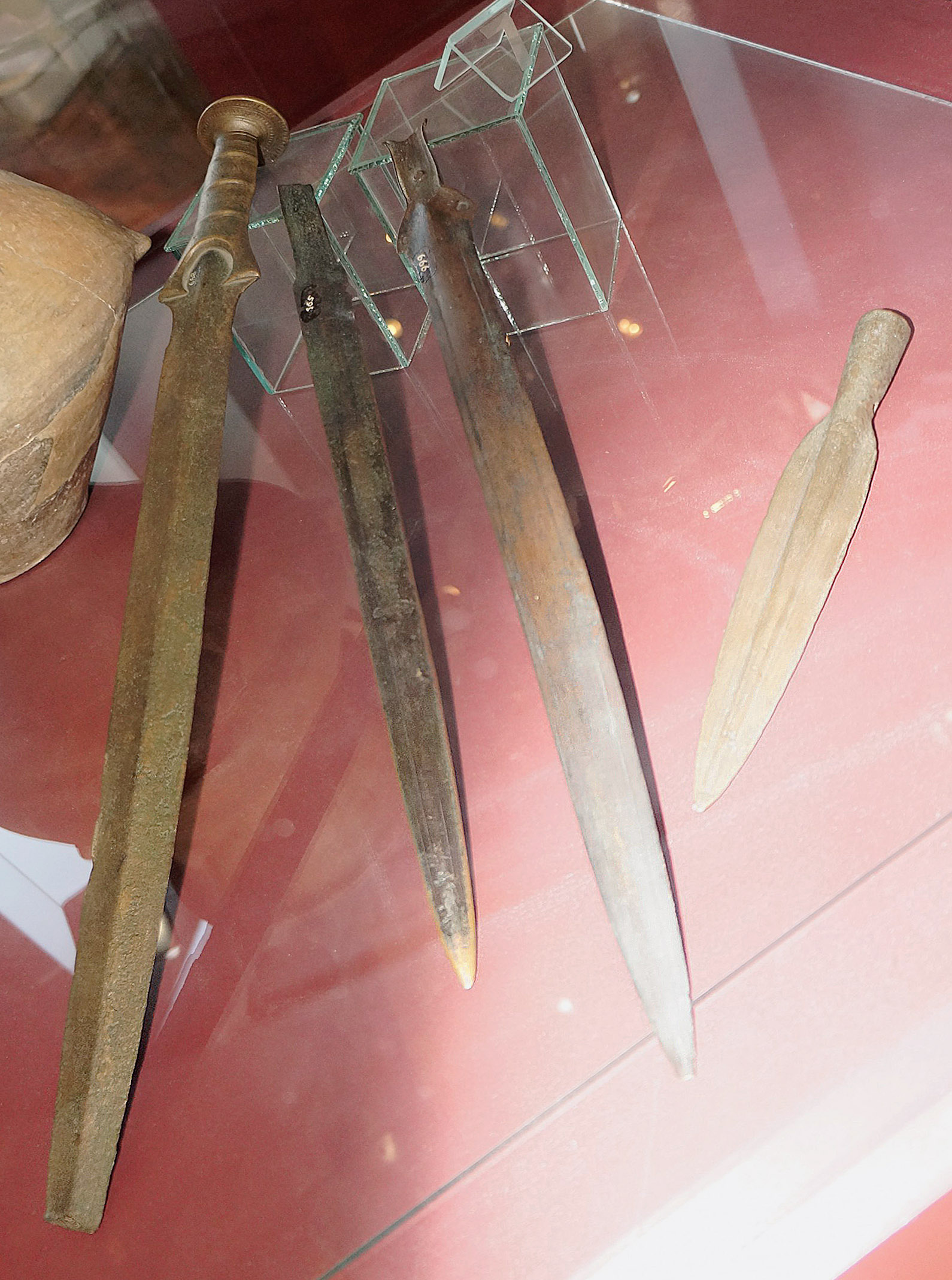
Bronze swords and spearhead

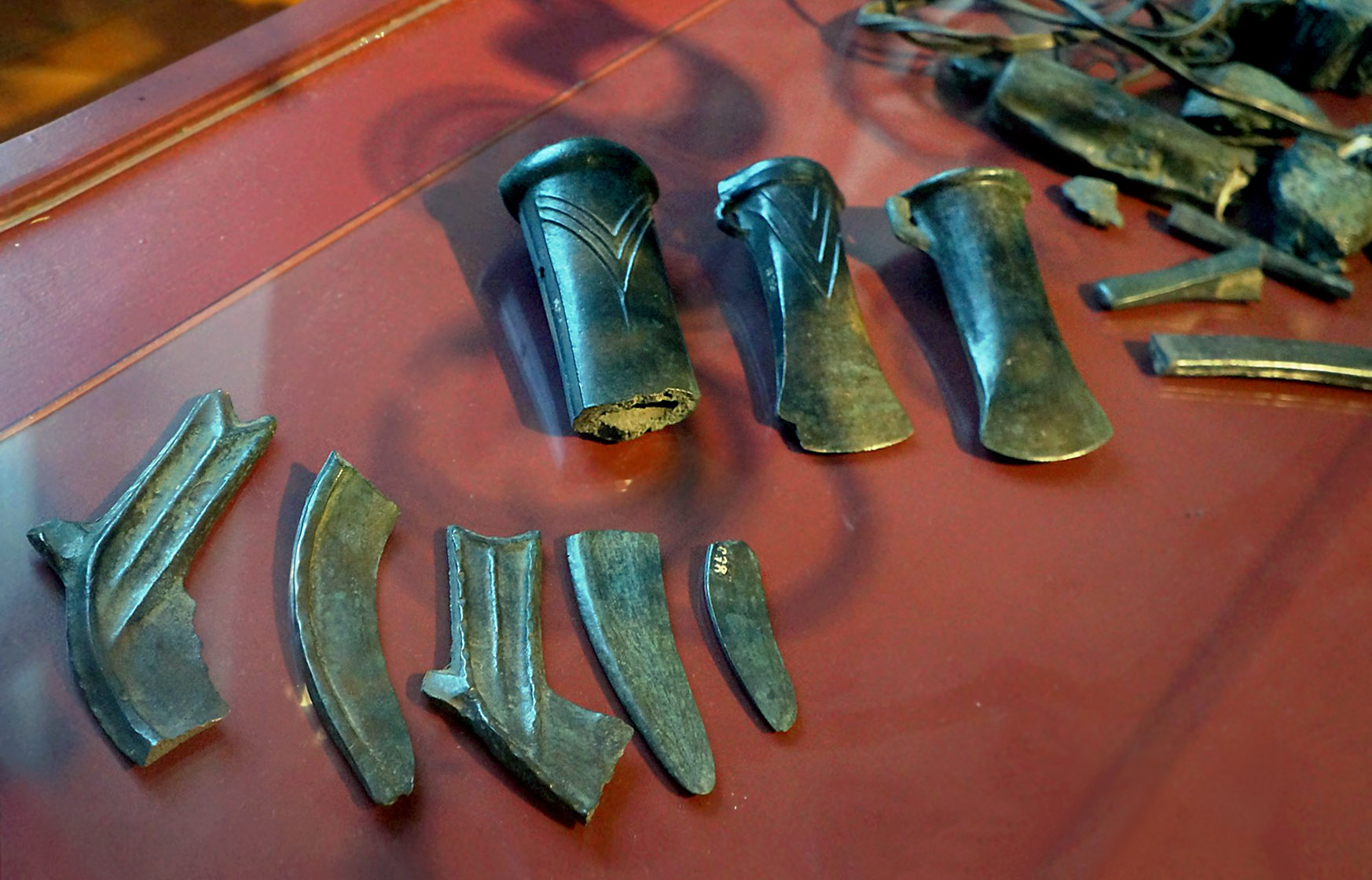

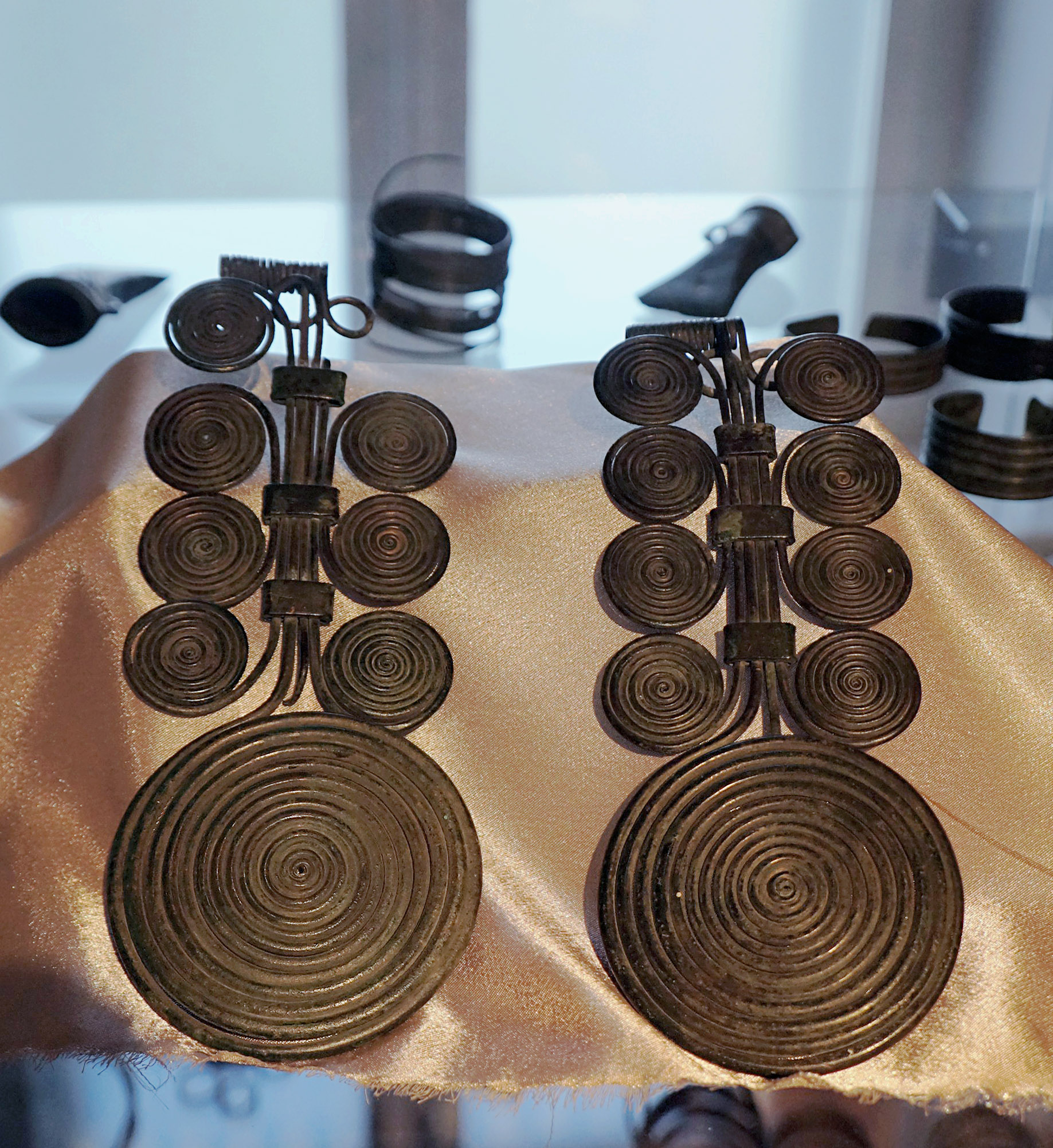

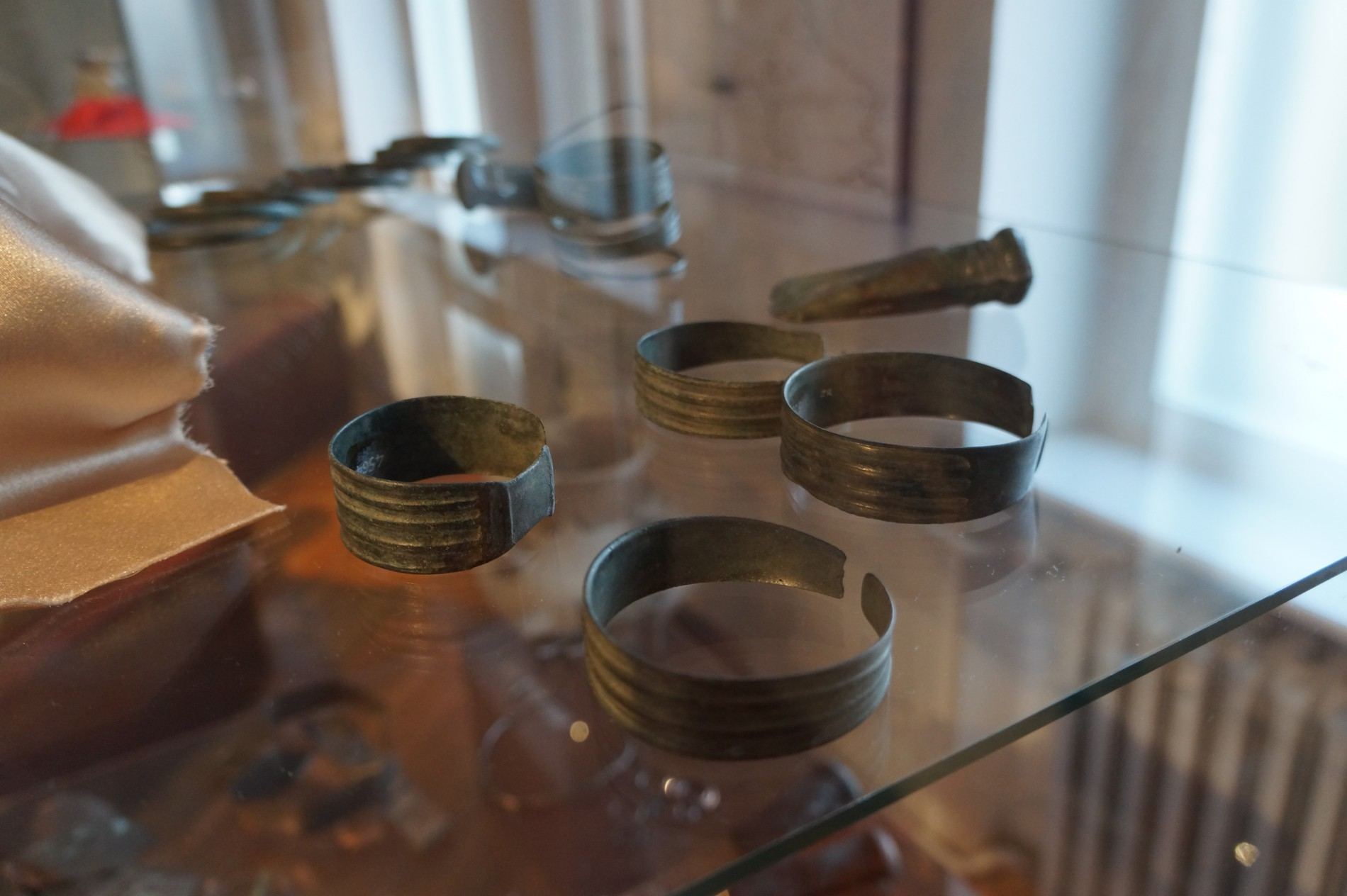

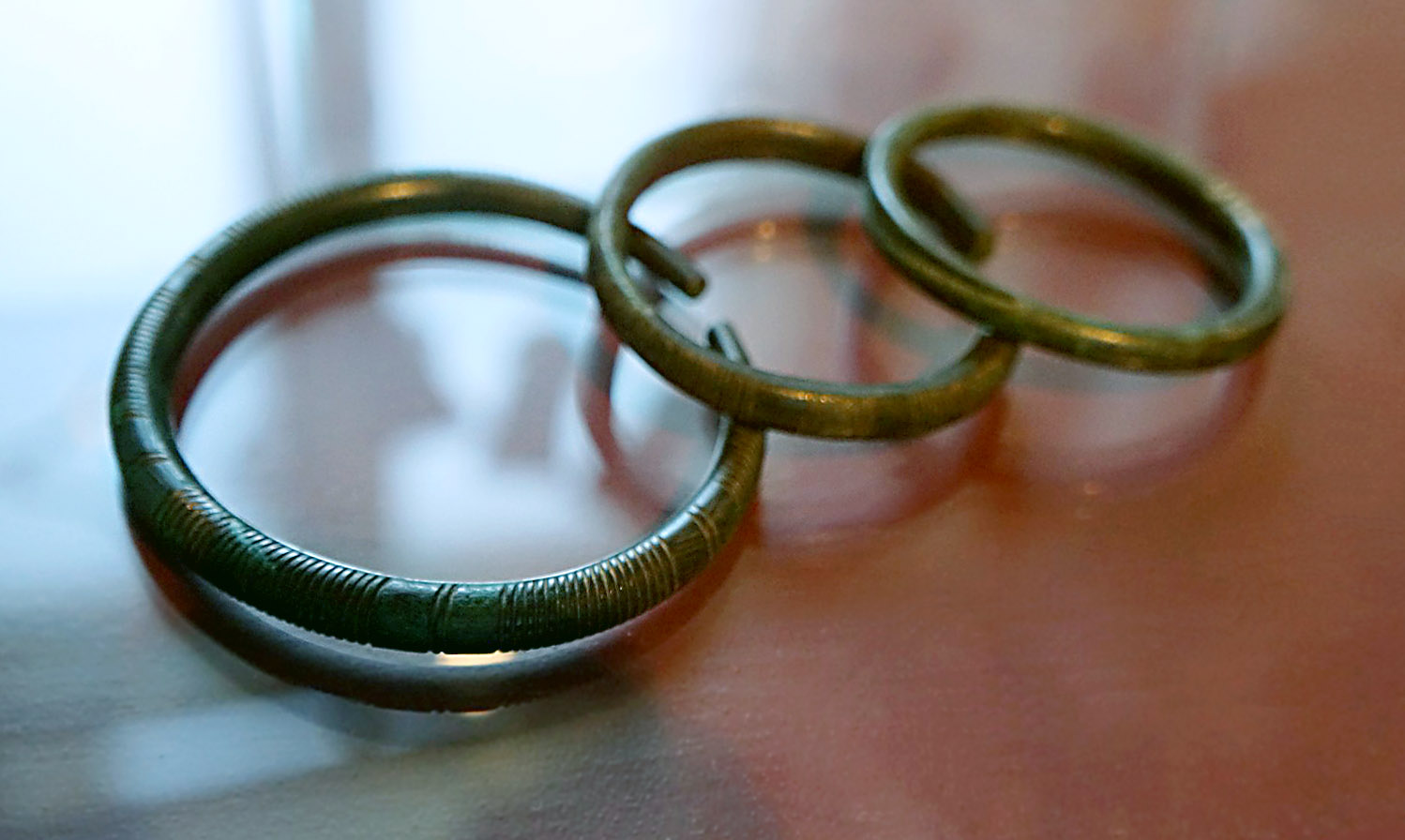

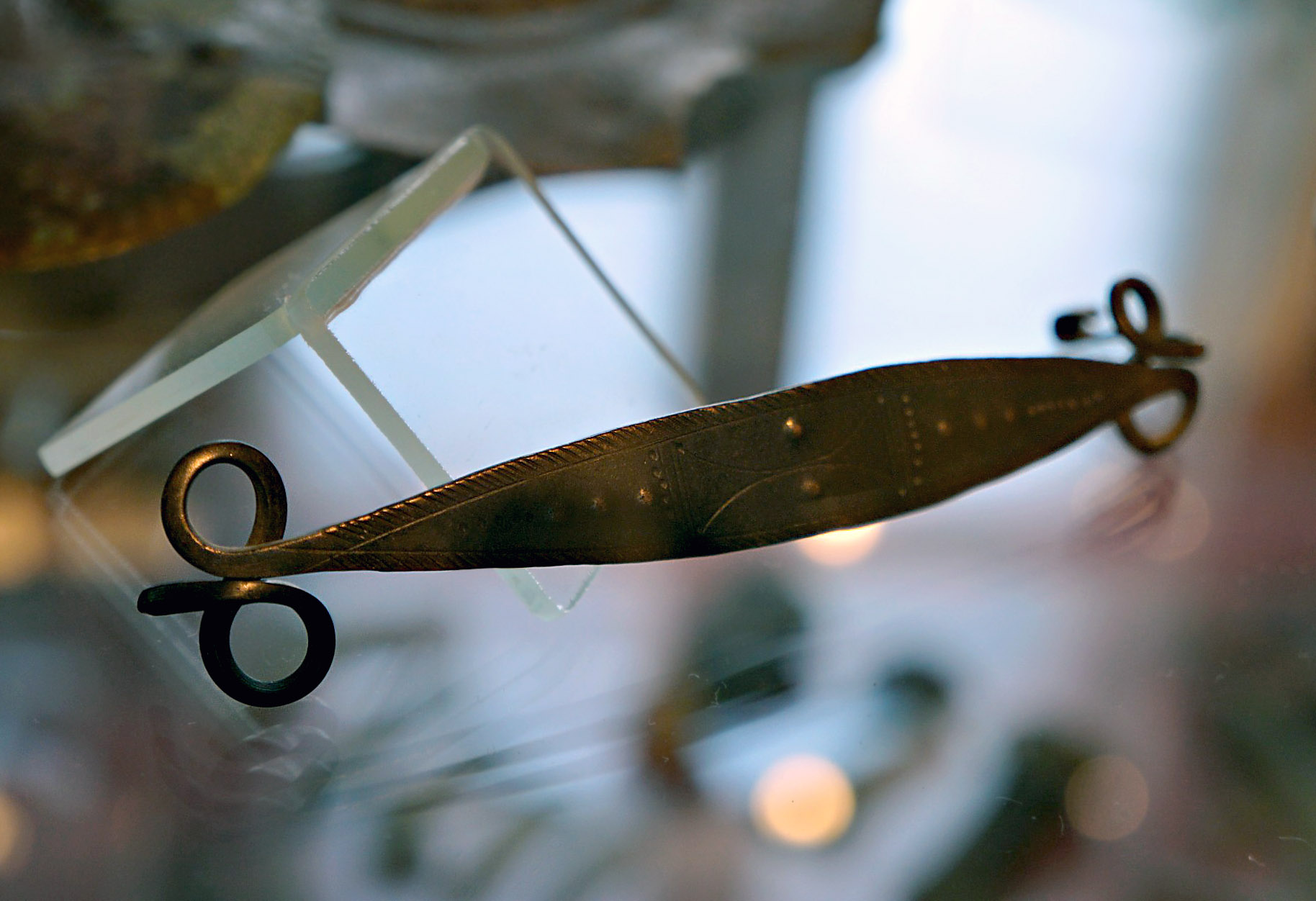

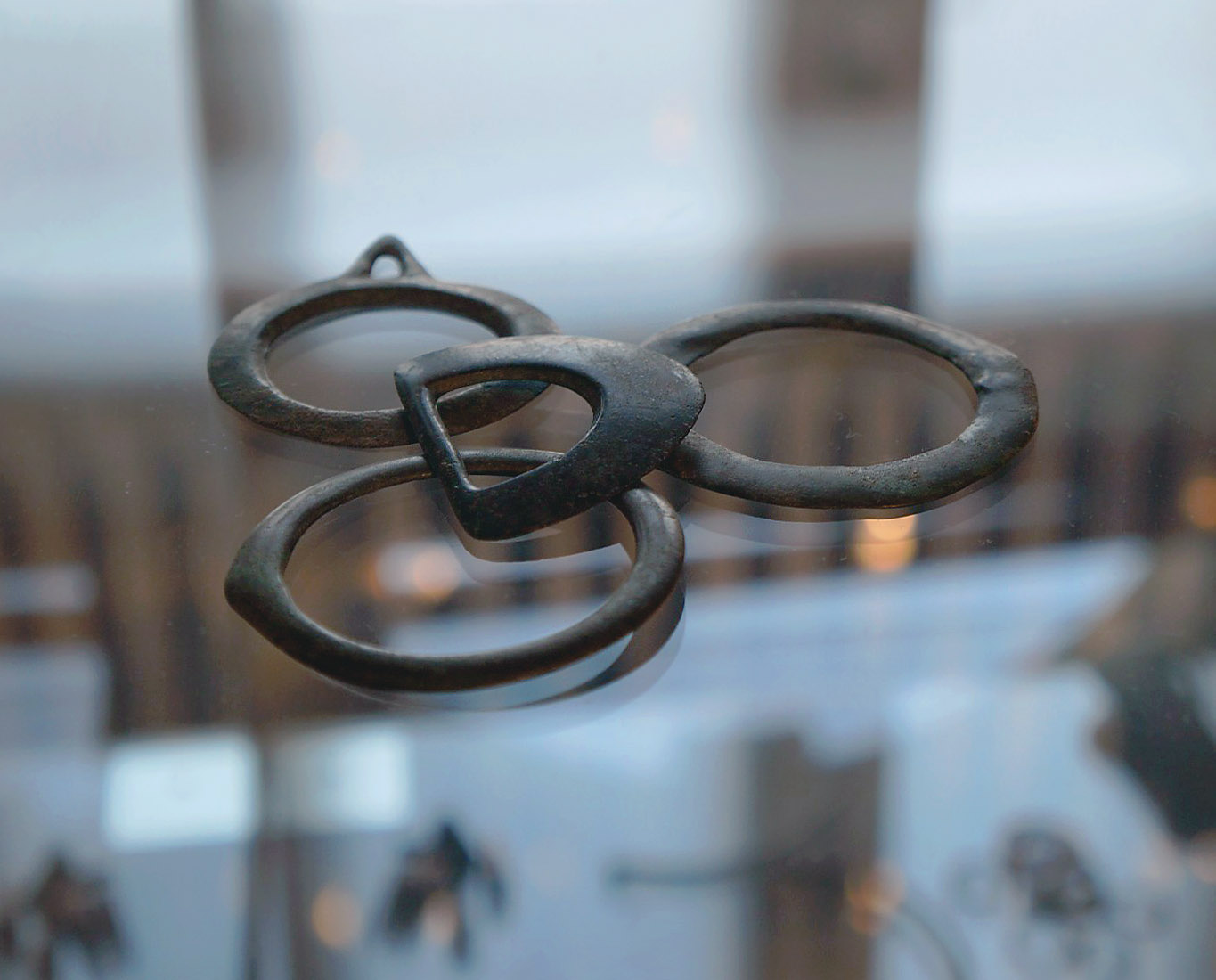

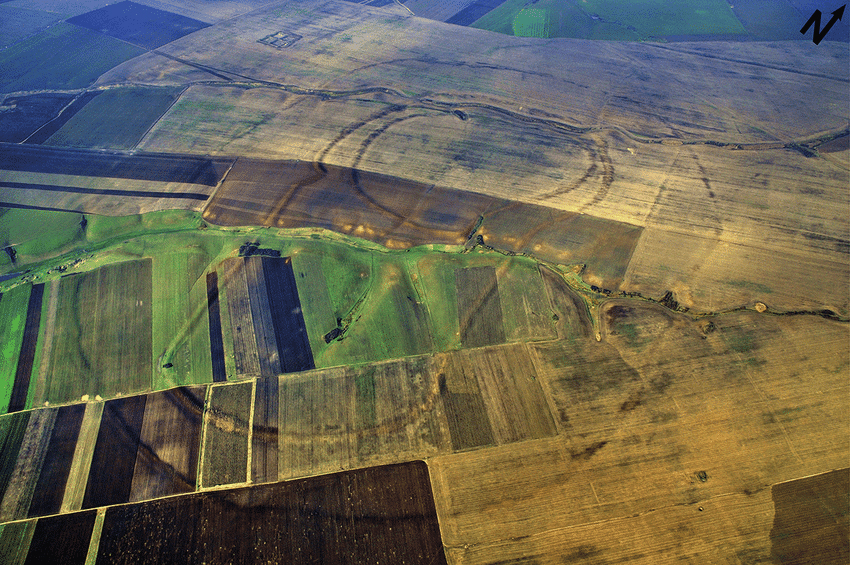
Corneşti-Iarcuri, associated with the Cruceni-Belegiš culture

== Population ==
- 1961: 2,633
- 1971: 2,440
- 1981: 2,430
- 1991: 2,605
- 2011: 2,973

== See also ==
- List of places in Serbia
- List of cities, towns and villages in Vojvodina
