= Cornești-Iarcuri =

Bronze Age Fortification near Cornești, Romania

- Dâmburile turcești
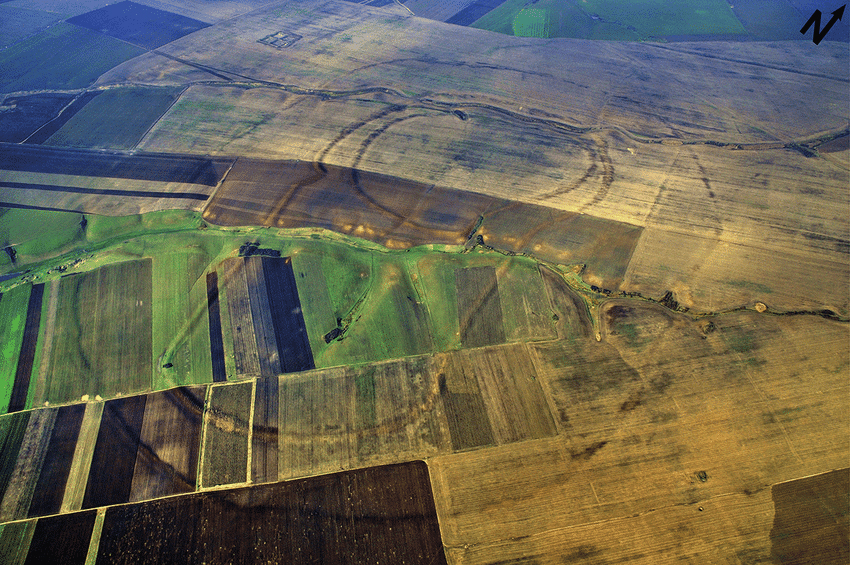

- Location within Romania
- 45°56′4″N 21°14′9″E
- Type: Fortification
- Periods: Bronze Age
- Cultures: Cruceni-Belegiš culture, Urnfield culture
- Location: Cornești, Timiș County, Romania

History
- Built: 1500-1400 BC
- Abandoned: 1100-1000 BC

Site notes
- Material: Beaten clay
- Area: 17.22 km^{2} (6.65 sq mi)
- Archaeologists: Ioachim Miloia, Marius Moga, Alexandru Szentmiklosi

Cornești-Iarcuri is a Bronze Age fortification near the village of Cornești, between Arad and Timișoara in Timiș County in the Banat region of western Romania. Locally, the site is also known as Iarcurior historically as Dâmburile turcești.

At around 17.22 km^{2}, it is the largest Bronze Age fortification in Europe, compared to others of the Bronze Age that are usually only a few hectares. This has led archaeologists to suggest that the fort was part of a regional-level organisation rather than a single settlement.

Archaeologists suggest the fort began construction around the fifteenth–fourteenth centuries BC. The site consists of four ramparts, which appear to have been constructed in multiple phases. The fort shows signs of widespread burning near the end of the second millennium BC.

== Location ==
The traces of the fortification are located 18 km north of Timișoara, east of the Timișoara–Arad road, with the center at c. 2.5 km north of the hearth of Cornești. The site lies at the southeastern edge of the Mureș alluvial fan, part of the eastern Pannonian Basin. The fortification has four concentric enclosures intersected by the Pistrui valley to the south, which east of the village changes its name to Valea Luciului or Vâna Nerat. To the north, the fortification is bordered by the Carani valley.

== History and dating ==
The first evidence for the existence of a large earthen fortification on the territory of Cornești (then known by the Hungarian name Zsadány, Romanian: Jadani, German: Saden) appeared on the so-called "Mercy maps" (map series created between 1723 and 1725 by Count Claude Florimond de Mercy). The earthen ramparts delimiting the Enclosures I and II were marked at that time with the toponym of Schantz Klenovaz/Schanz Kienovatz. More detailed maps of the site, including the third enclosure, were created by the military in the 19th and early 20th centuries. The outermost enclosure was only discovered in 1973 on aerial photographs, as it is hardly visible on the ground.

The first mention in specialized archeological literature seems to belong to József Péch (1877). Nevertheless, the first archeological surveys were carried out by Ioachim Miloia in the summer of 1933 on the land of mayor Nicolae Manase. They were resumed in the summer of 1939 by Marius Moga. The outbreak of World War II and Moga's enlistment in the army determined the abandonment of archeological research.

Most of the sources until Miloia considered the fortress an Avar ring, a fortification built by the Avar remnants who retreated to the east following the defeat by Charlemagne. According to Moga, the earthen ramparts of Cornești can be attributed to much earlier periods, namely the middle stage of the Bronze Age or the Dacian period. Another hypothesis, supported by C. Răileanu in 1981, but refuted by Florin Medeleț, considered the ruins as the remains of the city of Tema, mentioned in the Ravenna Cosmography.

The surface research undertaken by Dorel Micle, Liviu Măruia and Leonard Dorogostaisky in 2006 led to the identification of three settlements belonging to the early Copper Age (Tiszapolgár culture), middle-late Bronze Age (Cruceni-Belegiš culture, part of the Urnfield culture) and early Iron Age (Gornea-Kalakača group). The largest archeological survey was carried out between 2007 and 2017 by a team of Romanian, English and German archeologists and students. It revealed that the Bronze Age fortress at Cornești was built by the Cruceni-Belegiš communities in the second half of the 2nd millennium BC. It seems that it was the residence of a powerful chief, capable of coordinating the works of such a large-scale construction. Although no archeological evidence has been discovered to indicate any external attack, the end of the fortification is a violent one, having been set on fire towards the end of the 2nd millennium BC.

== Description ==
The innermost, almost circular, rampart (hereafter Enclosure I) has a diameter (east–west) of 1 km and is flanked to the north and south by two valleys. The second enclosure (Enclosure II) is more oval in nature and has a diameter (north–south) of about 2.2 km, encompassing Enclosure I, the two valleys, as well the southern terraces and plateau. The third rampart (Enclosure III) is also oval in shape with a diameter (north–south) of 2.8 km. The total area of over 17 km^{2} is that of the outermost ring (Enclosure IV), which measures 5.5 km east–west and c. 3.9 km north–south, with a perimeter length of almost 16 km.

The Enclosure I was built around 1500 BC and had a sacred character, being intended more for the chiefs. The next three enclosures were apparently erected at the same time, around 1400 BC. Inside the Enclosure II were located the homes of those who lived in the fortress. In addition, there was also an area reserved for household outbuildings and animal husbandry. It is believed that the fortress of Cornești-Iarcuri belonged to a population of farmers and animal breeders, who controlled the main access routes to various areas rich in raw materials (salt in Transylvania, gold in the Apuseni Mountains, copper in the Banat Mountains).
