= Ljubić (Čačak) =

Ljubić Љубић (Serbian)
- Village (Selo)
- Location within Serbia Ljubić (Europe)
- Coordinates: 43°54′10″N 20°21′20″E
- Country: Serbia
- District: Moravica District
- Municipalities: Čačak

Area
  - Total: 2.25 km^{2} (0.87 sq mi)
- Elevation: 224 m (735 ft)

Population (2022)
  - Total: 58
  - Density: 26/km^{2} (67/sq mi)
- Time zone: UTC+1 (CET)
  - Summer (DST): UTC+2 (CEST)
- Postal code: 32103

Ljubić (Serbian Cyrillic: Љубић) is a settlement in the municipality of Čačak, Serbia, in the Moravica District. According to the 2011 census, the village has a population of 61 people, reflecting its status as a quaint, sparsely populated community. Positioned around 2.5 km southwest of the urban center of Čačak, it lies at roughly 224 m above sea level and covers about 2.25 km².

A notable feature of the village is the Memorial Complex on Ljubić Hill, which honors the Battle of Ljubić—a significant engagement during the First Serbian Uprising. The site features a monument dedicated to national hero Tanasko Rajić and serves as both a historical landmark and a green recreational space for locals and visitors.

Football club FK Polet Ljubić is based here.
