= Somogyvár-Vinkovci culture =

Bronze Age archaeological culture

- Period: Early Bronze Age
- Dates: c. 2300-1600 BC
- Type site: Somogyvár, Vinkovci
- Preceded by: Vučedol culture, Coțofeni culture, Yamnaya culture
- Followed by: Encrusted Pottery culture, Vatin culture

The Somogyvár-Vinkovci culture was an Early Bronze Age archaeological culture in the Central Danube Carpathian Region.

This culture occurred in parallel with the Makó-Kosihy-Čaka cultural group. The period of its development covers the entire Early Bronze Age, from 2300/2200 BC to 1700/1600 BC (calibrated years). This culture occurs throughout most of Transdanubia, stretching beyond the Sava River in the south, encompassing a large part of Serbia and South Moravia, eastern Bosnia and Montenegro, reaching as far as the Adriatic coast. It was preceded by the Vučedol culture.

The end of this culture is not clear. According to N. Tasic, its decline would fall in the early stage of the development of the Encrusted Pottery culture and the Vatin culture. This is based on the presence of pottery typical of the population of the Somogyvár-Vinkovci culture in the inventories of the groups mentioned.

== Genetic profile ==
At Balatonkeresztúr-Réti-dűlő necropolis only one burial can be associated with this archaeological culture according to its 14C date (2560-2290 cal BCE). The individual buried there was lying on his back and with the knees and head on the left side, oriented North/Northeast to South/Southwest. His Y-DNA belonged to halplogroup R-M417. Further examination confirmed negative placement under haplogroup R1a-V2670. The sample now on Y-Full is confirmed basal. His mitochondrial DNA matched haplogroup K1a3a. His autosomal DNA composition was 17% hunter-gatherer, 40% European farmer, and 43% steppe ancestry. Some of his phenotypical traits were blond hair and blue eyes.

== Bibliography ==
- A Game of Clans, Carlos Quilles, Academia Prisca, 2019
- Kultury z przełomu eneolitu i epoki brązu w strefie karpackiej, Jan Machnik, Zakład narodowy imienia Ossolińskich, Wydawnictwo Polskiej Akademii Nauk, Wrocław 1987
- Stary i nowy świat (Od „rewolucji” neolitycznej do podbojów Aleksandra Wielkiego), pod red. Joachima Śliwy, Świat Książki, Fogra Oficyna Wydawnicza, Kraków 2005
- Die Vinkovci-Kultur, eine neue Kultur der Frühbronzezeit in Syrmien und Slawonien, N. Tasic, Archeologia Jugoslavica, t IX, 1968
- Geschichte der frühen und mittleren Bronzezeit in Ungarn und im mittleren Donauraum, I. Bóna, Annales Universitatis Scientiarum Budapesteniensis de Rolando Eötvös Nominatae, Sectio Historica, t. III, Budapest, 1961, s. 3-22
- Arheološka iskopavanja na području Vinkovačkog muzeja, rezultati 1957-1965, S. Dimitrijević, Acta Musei, Cibalensis, t. I, Vinkovci 1966
