= Mojsinje =

Coordinates: 43.8925°N 20.4717°E

- Village
- Interactive map of Mojsinje
- Country: Serbia
- District: Moravica District
- Municipality: Čačak

Area
  - Total: 9.62 km^{2} (3.71 sq mi)
- Elevation: 227 m (745 ft)

Population (2011)
  - Total: 836
  - Density: 86.9/km^{2} (225/sq mi)
- Time zone: UTC+1 (CET)
  - Summer (DST): UTC+2 (CEST)

Mojsinje (Serbian Cyrillic: Мојсиње) is a village in the municipality of Čačak, Serbia. According to the 2011 census, the village has a population of 836 people.
