= Karanovac, Varvarin =

Karanovac Карановац
- Village
- Location within Serbia
- Coordinates: 43°43′48″N 21°10′29″E
- Country: Serbia
- Region: Šumadija and Western Serbia
- District: Rasina
- Municipality: Varvarin
- Elevation: 738 ft (225 m)

Population (2011)
  - Total: 290
- Time zone: UTC+1 (CET)
  - Summer (DST): UTC+2 (CEST)

Karanovac is a village in the municipality of Varvarin, Serbia. According to the 2011 census, the village has a population of 290 inhabitants.

== Population ==
Population of Karanovac
1948	1953	1961	1971	1981	1991	2002	2011
919	929	864	758	677	515	409	290
