= Battle of Ljubić =

1815 battle of the Serbian Revolution

- Part of Second Serbian Uprising
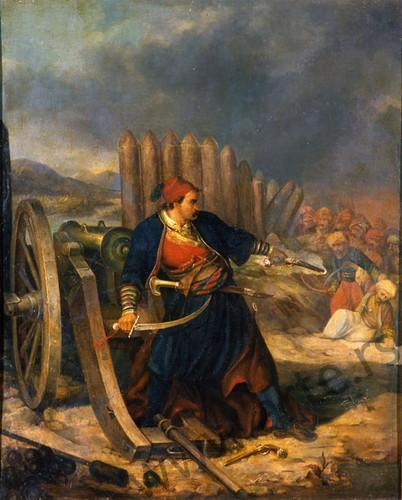
- Oil on canvas Painting by Rihard Puhta, 1862
Date	8 May 1815
Location	Ljubić, Ottoman Empire 43°54′52″N 20°22′01″E
Result	Serbian victory

Belligerents
Serbian rebels	Ottoman Empire

Commanders and leaders
Miloš Obrenović; Tanasko Rajić †; Lazar Mutap (DOW); Milutin Garašanin; Milić Drinčić; Jovan Dobrača	Imshir Çaja-pasha †; Kara Mustafa-pasha †

Strength
1,700 later reinforcement with 3,000 men and 200 cavalry	5,000 to 12,000 men

Casualties and losses
c. 1,500 killed	7,000 killed
- Location within Serbia

The Battle of Ljubić (Serbian: Битка на Љубићу, Бој на Љубићу) was a pitched battle between the Serbian revolutionary forces under Miloš Obrenović and the Ottoman troops commanded by Ćaja-paša, on the Ljubić hill near Čačak. It was the largest and most significant armed engagement of the Second Serbian Uprising.

== History ==
After the liberation of Rudnik, Serbian Revolutionaries commanded by Lazar Mutap began attacking Ottoman positions near Čačak. On 6 May 1815 the Ottomans responded to Serbian incursions by sending a force of 7,000-strong under Imšir Ćaja-paša to attack the rebels from the rear. The rebels quickly retreated to Ljubić hill, where they regrouped and were reinforced with detachments commanded by Miloš Obrenović and Jovan Dimitrijević Dobrača. The initial Serbian forces were 1,500 infantry and 200 cavalry, with additional reinforcements of 3,000-strong. The battle ended in Serbian victory, with Serbs capturing large areas of territory and seizing valuable amounts of weaponry. Serbian losses amounted to 1,500, against the complete destruction of Ottoman forces, including their commander Imšir (Ćaja-Paša). The City of Čačak was captured and Serbs further advanced to Kragujevac, Jagodina, Karanovac, Batočina, and Požarevac.

== Sources ==
- Ćirković, Sima (2004). The Serbs. Malden: Blackwell Publishing. ISBN 9781405142915.
