= Dobrača =

Dobrača Добрача (Serbian)
- Village
- Location within Serbia
- Coordinates: 44°04′N 20°43′E
- Country: Serbia
- District: Šumadija District
- Municipality: Stragari
- Elevation: 335 m (1,099 ft)

Population (2011)
  - Total: 425
- Time zone: UTC+1 (CET)
  - Summer (DST): UTC+2 (CEST)

Dobrača (Serbian: Добрача) is a village located in the city of Kragujevac, Serbia. According to the 2011 census, the village has a population of 425 inhabitants.
