= History of Slovakia before the Slovaks =

The area today known as Slovakia has been inhabited throughout the prehistoric period.

== Palaeolithic ==
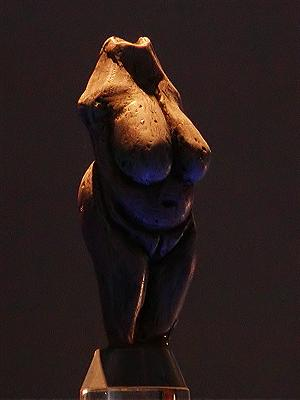
Venus of Moravany, c. 22,800 BCE

Radiocarbon dating puts the oldest surviving archaeological artifacts from Slovakia—found near Nové Mesto nad Váhom—at 270,000 BCE, in the Early Paleolithic era. These ancient tools, made by the Clactonian technique, bear witness to the ancient habitation of Slovakia.

Other stone tools from the Middle Paleolithic era (200,000–80,000 BCE) come from the Prepost cave (Prepoštská jaskyňa) near Bojnice and from other nearby sites. The most important discovery from that era is a Neanderthal cranium (c. 200,000 BCE), discovered near Gánovce, a village in northern Slovakia.

Archaeologists have found prehistoric Homo sapiens skeletons in the region, as well as numerous objects and vestiges of the Gravettian culture, principally in the river valleys of Nitra, Hron, Ipeľ, Váh and as far as the city of Žilina, and near the foot of the Vihorlat, Inovec, and Tribeč mountains, as well as in the Myjava Mountains. The most well-known finds include the oldest female statue made of mammoth-bone (22,800 BCE), the famous Venus of Moravany. The figurine was found in the 1940s in Moravany nad Váhom near Piešťany. Numerous necklaces made of shells from Cypraca thermophile gastropods of the Tertiary period have come from the sites of Moravany-Žákovská, Podkovice, Hubina and Radošina. These findings provide the most ancient evidence of commercial exchanges carried out between the Mediterranean and Central Europe.

== Neolithic ==
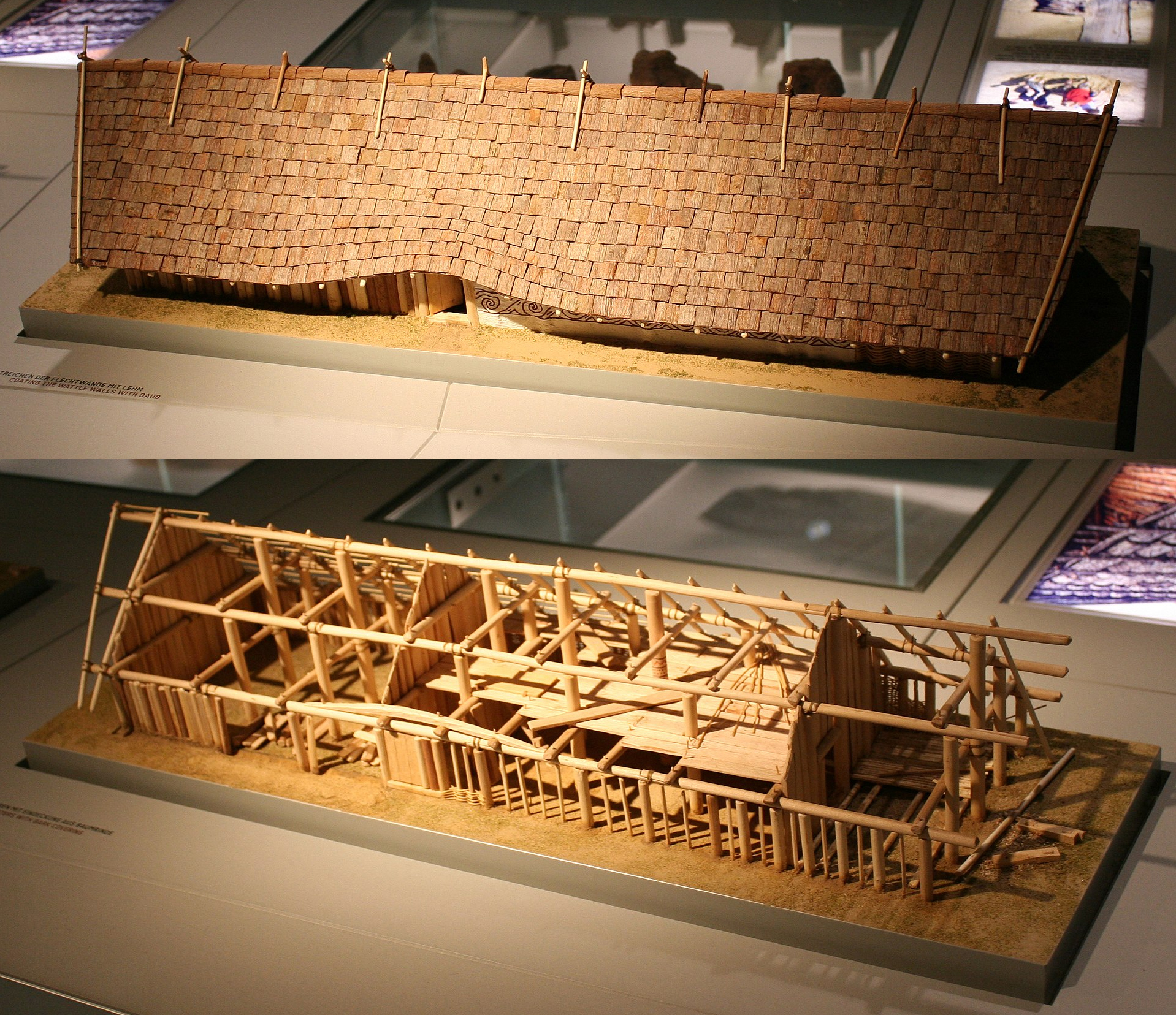
Linear Pottery culture longhouse, c. 5000 BC

Discovery of tools and pottery in several archaeological digs and burial places scattered across Slovakia, surprisingly including northern regions at relatively high altitudes, gives evidence of human habitation in the Neolithic period. The pottery found in Želiezovce, Gemer, and the Bukové hory massif is characterized by remarkable modeling and delicate linear decoration. It also reveals the first attempts at coloring. This deliberate adornment shows a developed aesthetic sense of the Neolithic craftsmen.

Important archaeological discoveries have been made in several formerly-inhabited caves. For example, humans inhabited the famous Domica cave, almost 6000 meters long, to a depth of 700 meters. This cave offers one of the biggest Neolithic deposits in Europe. The tribes who created the pottery from the Massif Bukové hory inhabited Domica continuously for more than 800 years.

The transition to the Neolithic era in Central Europe featured the development of agriculture and the clearing of pastures, the first smelting of metals at the local level, the "Retz" style pottery and also fluted pottery. During the "fluted-pottery" era, people built several fortified sites. Some vestiges of these remain today, especially in high-altitude areas. Pits surround the most well-known of these sites at Nitriansky Hrádok. Starting in the Neolithic era, the geographic location of present-day Slovakia hosted a dense trade-network for goods such as shells, amber, jewels and weapons. As a result, it became an important hub in the system of European trade routes.

== Bronze Age ==
The Bronze Age on the territory of Slovakia went through three stages of development, stretching from 2000 to 800 BCE. Major cultural, economic, and political development can be attributed to the significant growth in production of copper, especially in central Slovakia (for example in Špania Dolina) and north-west Slovakia. Copper became a stable source of prosperity for the local population. In the Early Bronze Age the Unetice culture established important centres in western Slovakia such as the large fortified settlement of Fidvár, which was involved in the mining of nearby gold and tin deposits. Eastern Slovakia was dominated by the contemporary Ottomány culture. These cultures were succeeded by the Middle Bronze Age Mad'arovce and Tumulus cultures, followed by the Late Bronze Age Čaka, Velatice and Piliny cultures, which were part of the broader Urnfield culture. Following their disappearance, the Lusatian culture expanded, building strong and complex fortifications with large permanent buildings and administrative centres. Excavations of Lusatian hill forts document the substantial development of trade and agriculture in that period.

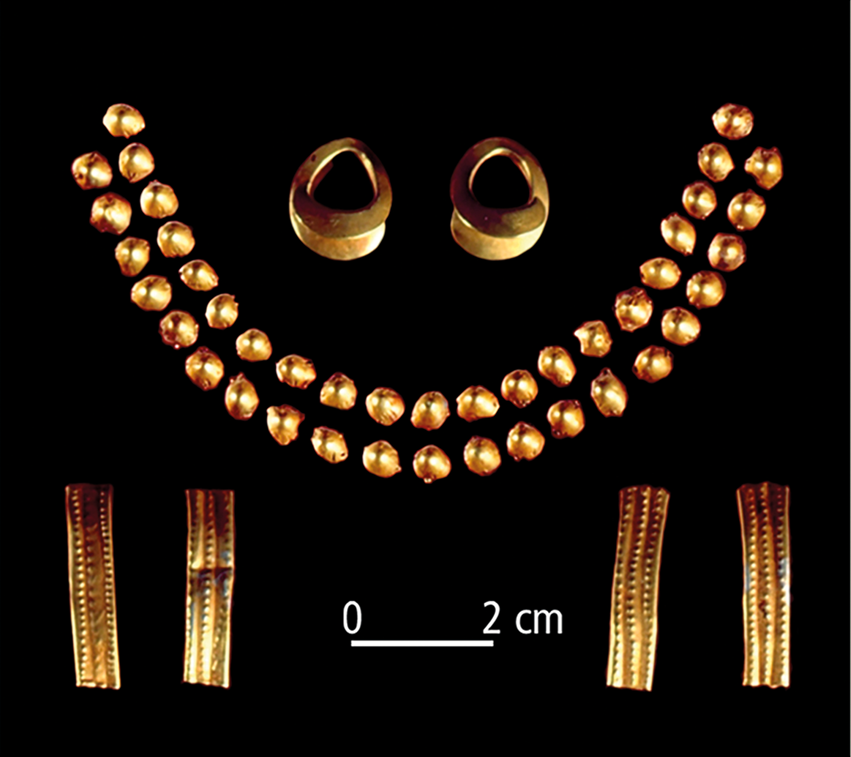
Gold burial goods from Nižná Myšľa, Ottomany culture

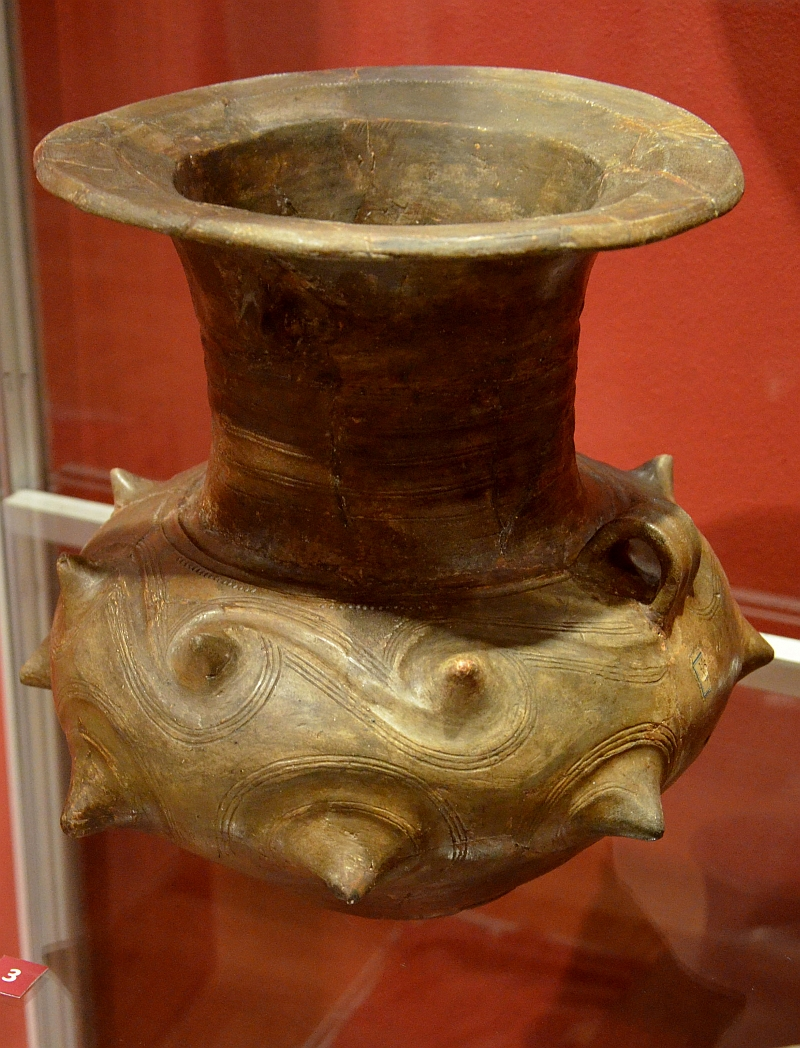
Pottery from Barca, Ottomany culture

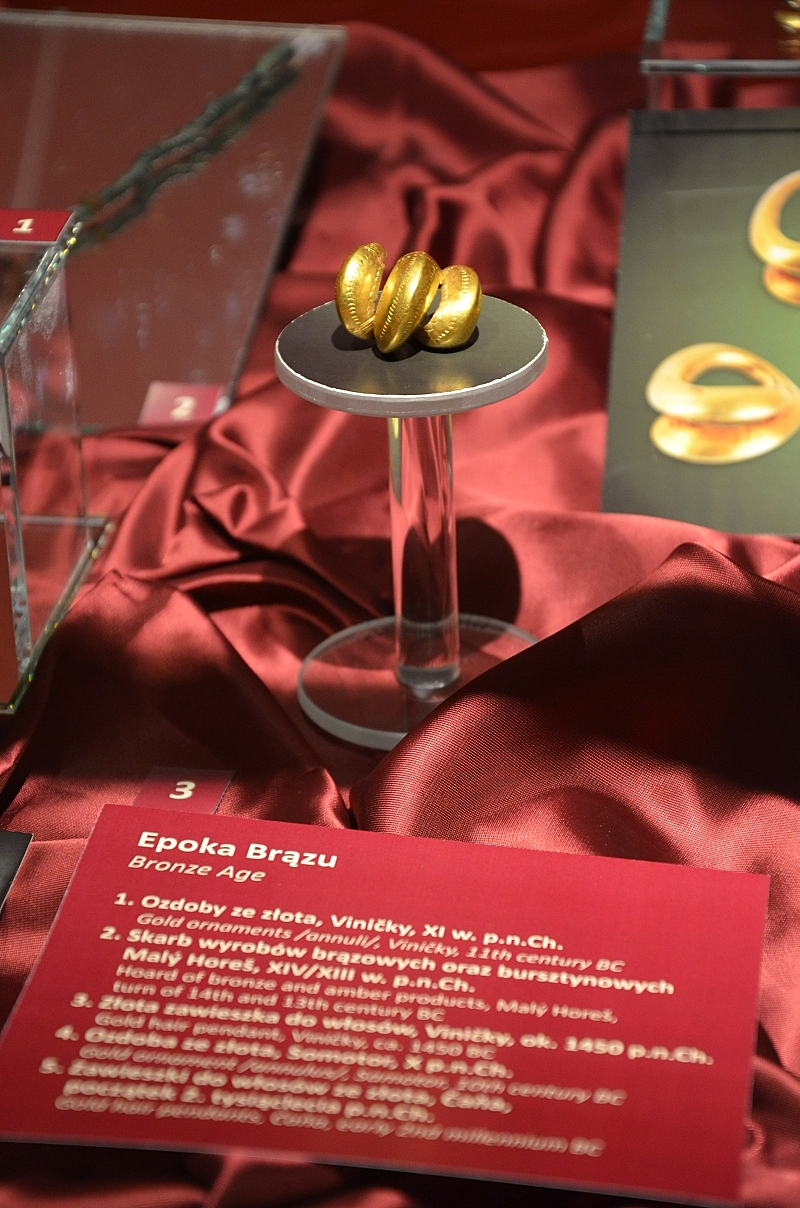
Gold hair ring, Tumulus culture 1450 BC

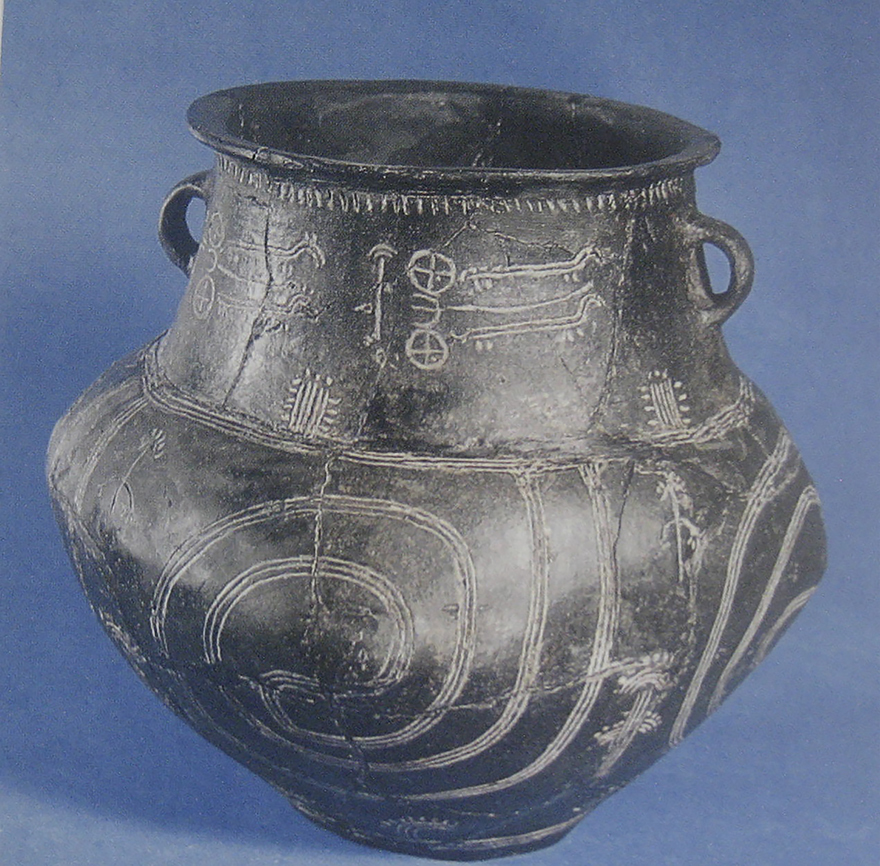
Urn with chariot depictions, 14th century BC.

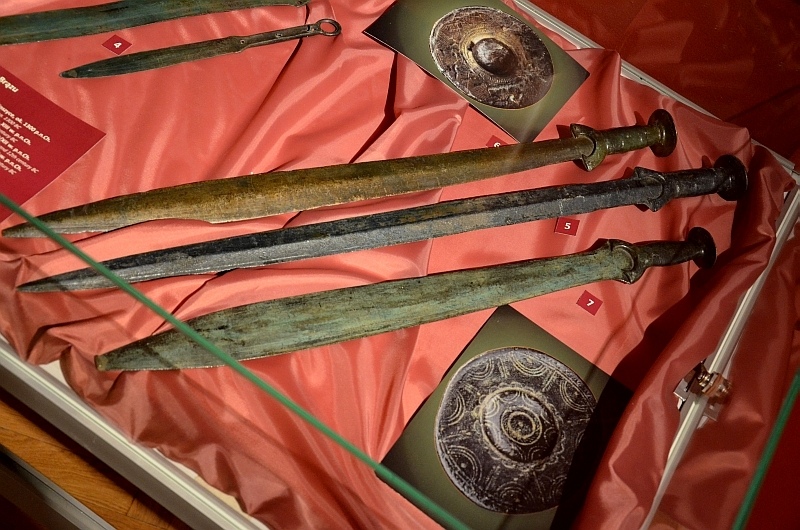
Naue II bronze swords, 1200-1100 BC

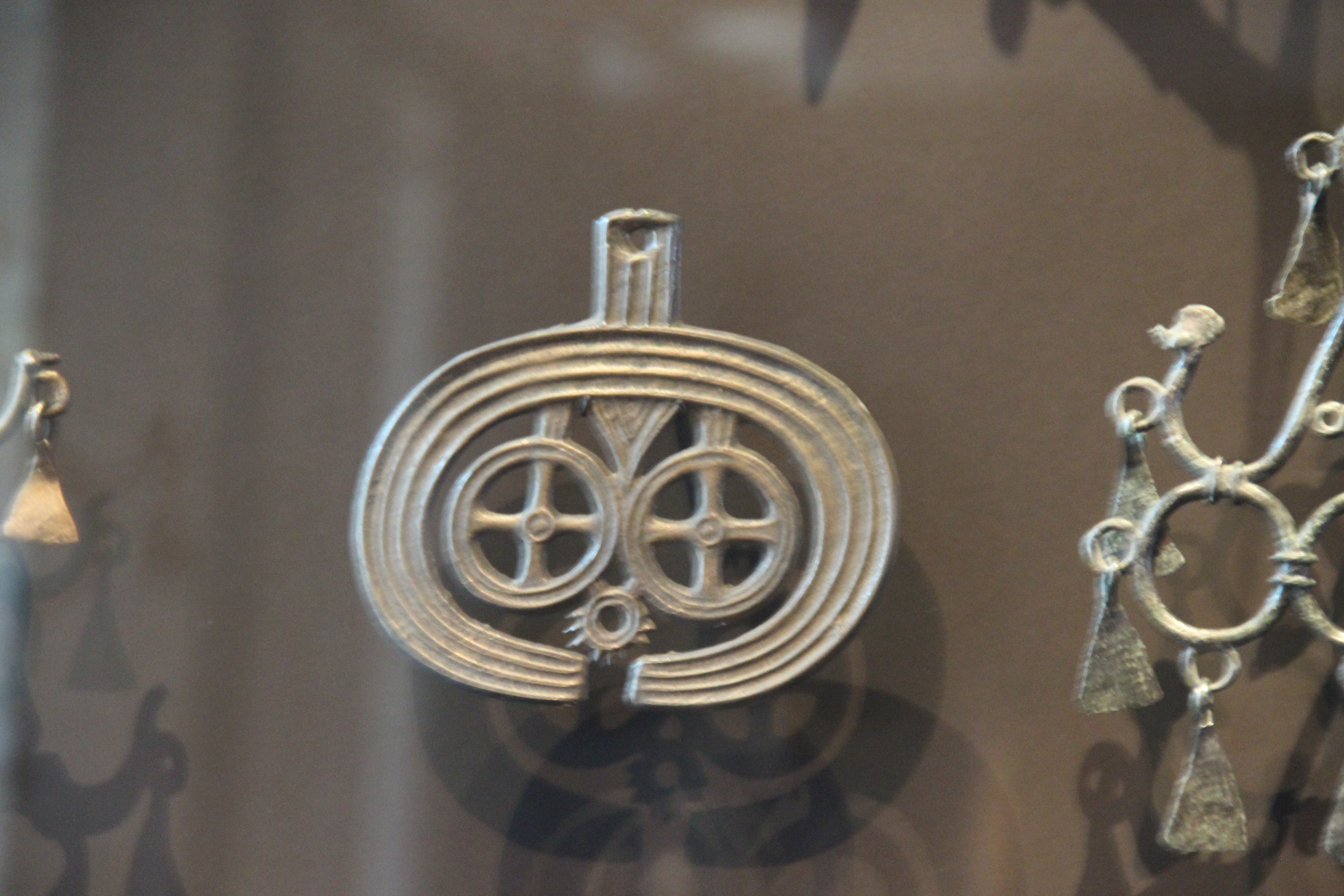
Bronze ornament, Piliny culture, 13th century BC.

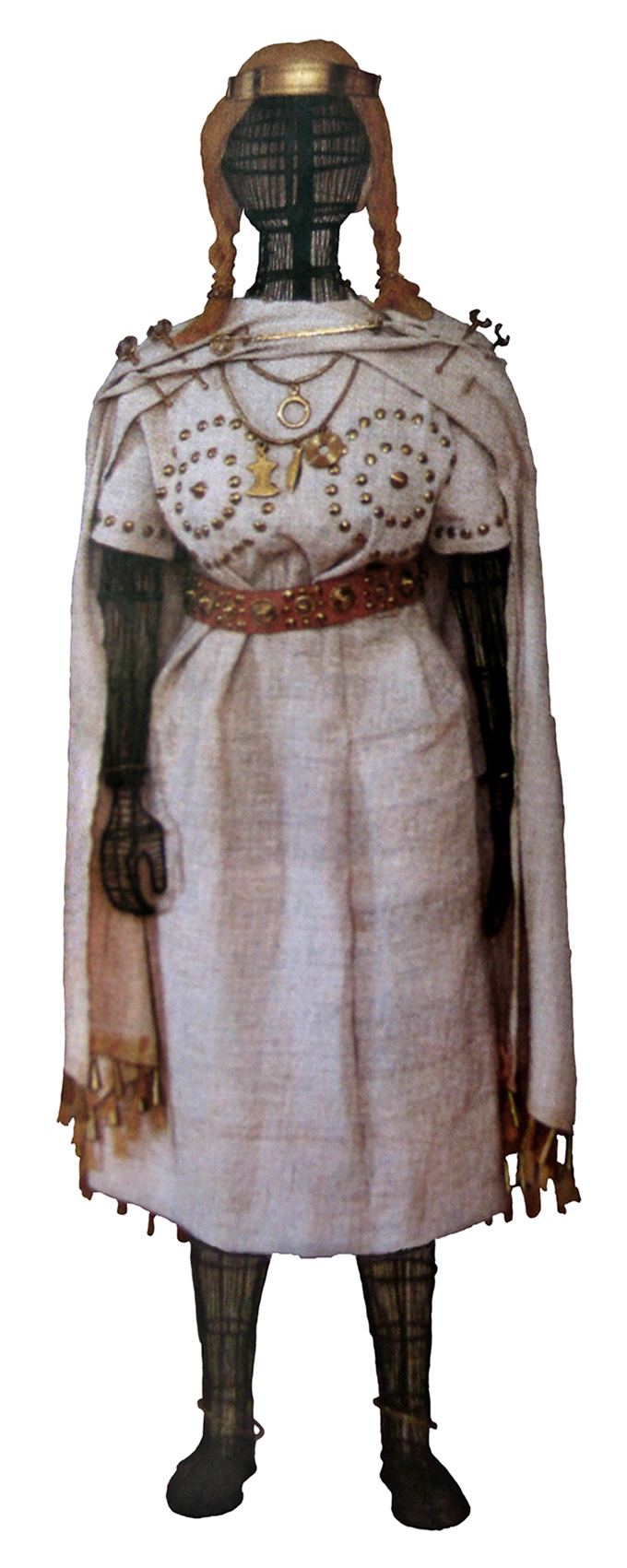
High-status female, Čaka/Urnfield culture, 1200-1100 BC.

== Iron Age ==
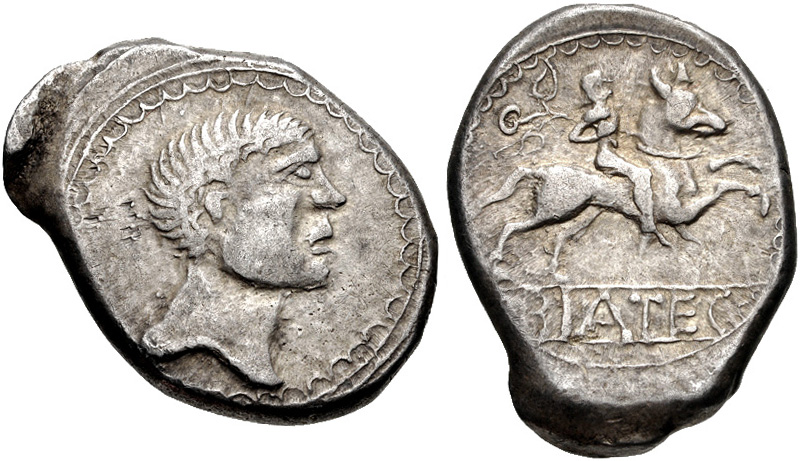
Biatec, presumably a king, who appeared on the Celtic coins minted by the Boii at the current location of Bratislava, 1st century B.C.

In the Early Iron Age the richness and the diversity of tombs increased considerably with the development of the Hallstatt culture. The inhabitants of the area manufactured arms, shields, jewelry, dishes, and statues. The arrival of tribes from Thrace disrupted the people of the Calenderberg culture, who lived in the hamlets located on the plain (Sereď), and also in the hill forts located on the summits (Smolenice, Molpí). The local power of the Hallstatt "Princes" disappeared in Slovakia during the last period of the Iron Age after strife between the Scytho-Thracian people and Celtic tribes who advanced from the south towards the north, following the Slovak rivers.

The victory of the Celts marked the beginning of the late Iron Age in the region. Two major Celtic tribes living in Slovakia were Cotini and Boii. Cotini were probably identical or made significant part of so-called Púchov culture. The Celts built large oppida in Bratislava and Liptov (the Havránok shrine). Silver coins with the names of Celtic kings, the so-called Biatecs, represent the first known use of writing in Slovakia. Celtic dominance disappeared with the Germanic incursions, the victory of Dacia over the Boii near the Neusiedler See, and the expansion of the Roman Empire.

== Roman era ==
The Roman epoch began in Slovakia in 6 CE, inaugurated by the arrival of Roman legions on this territory that led to a war against the Marcomanni and Quadi tribes. The Kingdom of Vannius, a barbarian kingdom founded by the Quadi, existed in western and central Slovakia from 20 to 50 AD. The Romans and their armies occupied only a thin strip of the right bank of the Danube and a very small part of south-western Slovakia (Celemantia, Gerulata, Devín Castle).

Only in 174 CE did the emperor Marcus Aurelius penetrate deeper into the river valleys of Váh, Nitra and Hron. On the banks of the Hron he wrote his philosophical work Meditations. In 179 CE, a Roman legion engraved on the rock of the Trenčín Castle the ancient name of Trenčín (Laugaritio), marking the furthest northern point of their presence in this part of Europe.

== The great invasions of the 4–8th centuries ==
In the 2nd and 3rd centuries CE the Huns began to leave the Central Asian steppes. They crossed the Danube in 377 CE and occupied Pannonia, which they used for 75 years as their base for launching looting-raids into Western Europe. In 451, under the command of Attila, they crossed the Rhine and laid Gaul to waste; then crossed even the Pyrenees, devastating the countryside of Catalonia. However, Attila's death in 453 brought about the collapse of the Hunnic Empire (and eventual disappearance of the Huns as a people).

After the Huns in the 5–6th century German tribes such as the Ostrogoths, Lombards, Gepids and Heruli, began to settle in the Pannonian Basin. Their reign and rivalry determined the events during the first two-thirds of the 6th century. In the 6th century, an early Lombard state was centered in the territory of present-day Slovakia. Subsequently, the Lombards left from this area and moved first to Pannonia and then to Italy, where their statehood was continued until the 11th century.

In 568 a nomadic tribe, the Avars, conducted their own invasion into the Middle Danube region. The Avars occupied the lowlands of the Pannonian Plain, established an empire dominating the Pannonian Basin and they made several raids against the Byzantine Empire whose emperors sent gifts regularly to them in order to avoid their attacks. In 623, the Slavic population living in the western parts of Pannonia seceded from their empire. In 626, the Avars and the Persians jointly besieged but failed to capture Constantinople; following this failure, the Avars' prestige and power declined and they lost the control over their former territories outside the Pannonian Basin but their reign has lasted to 804.
