= Piliny culture =

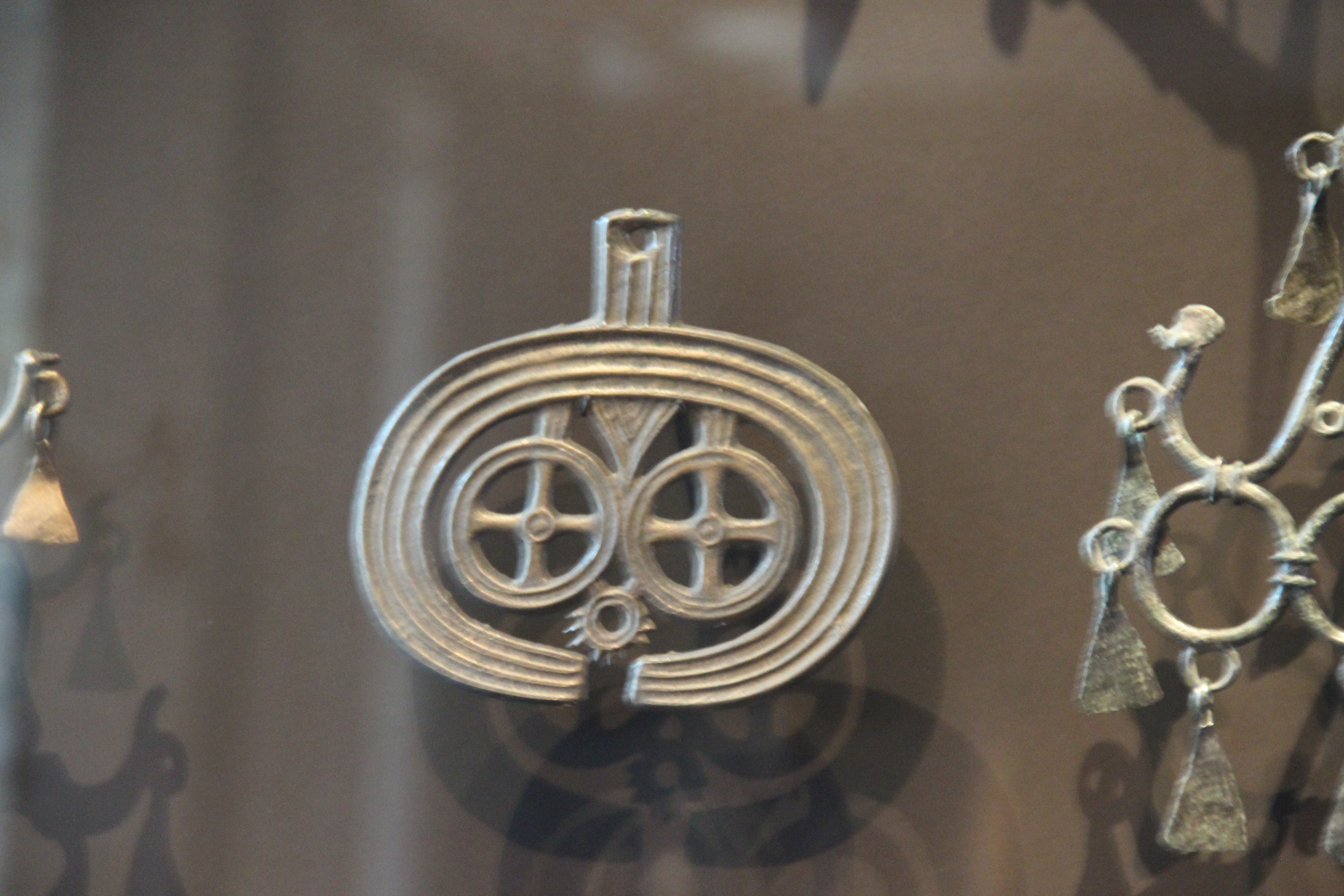
Bronze ornament, Slovakia, 13th century BC.

The Piliny culture was a Bronze Age culture in northern Hungary and Slovakia that existed from about 1300 to 700 B.C. It was part of the Urnfield culture.
