= Ottomány culture =

Early Bronze Age culture

- Geographical range: Hungary, Slovakia, Romania, Ukraine, Poland
- Period: Bronze Age
- Dates: 2100-1400 BC
- Preceded by: Nyírség culture, Hatvan culture, Coțofeni culture
- Followed by: Tumulus culture, Urnfield culture

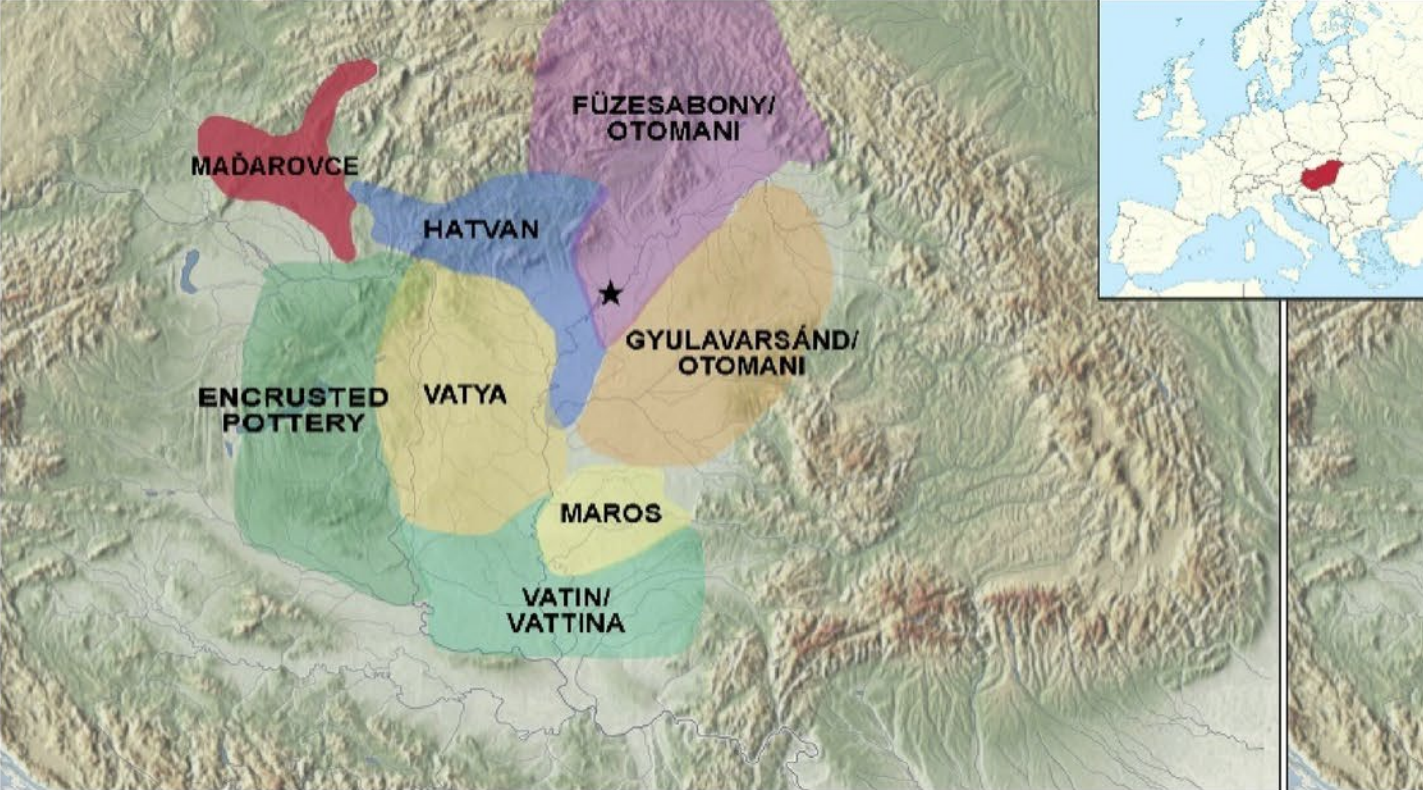
Geographic distribution of Middle Bronze Age cultures in the Carpathian Basin: Maros culture, Hatvan culture, Vatya culture, Vatin culture, Mad'arovce culture, Encrusted Pottery culture

The Ottomány culture, also known as Otomani culture in Romania or Otomani-Füzesabony culture in Hungary, was an early Bronze Age culture (c. 2100–1400 BC) in Central Europe named after the eponymous site near the village of Ottomány (Romanian: Otomani), today part of Sălacea, located in modern-day Bihor County, Romania. The Middle Bronze Age period of the Ottomány culture in eastern Hungary and western Romania (c. 1750 BC to 1400 BC) is also known as the Gyulavarsánd culture.

== Territorial extent ==
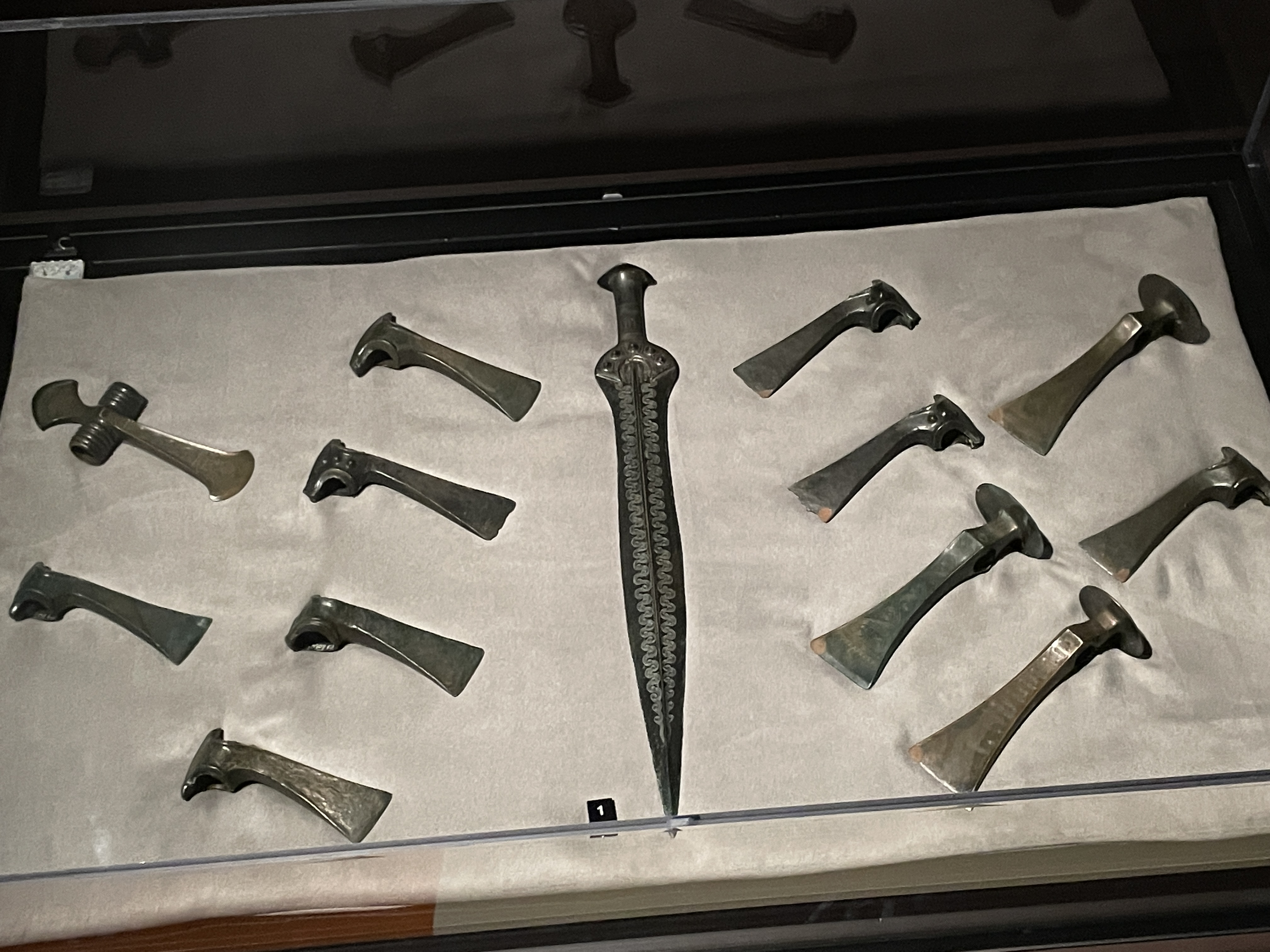
Hajdúsámson hoard, bronze sword and axes, Hungary, 1700-1600 BC.

The Ottomány culture was located in eastern Hungary, eastern Slovakia, Crișana in western Romania, western Ukraine - Transcarpatia (Zakarpattia Oblast - within a stretch of the Carpathian Mountains) and southeast Poland (stretch of Carpathian Mountains and nearby areas). Thus, people of the Ottomány culture secured a middle stretch of what will be later known as the Amber Road, and indeed, amber is often found in Ottomány sites. The expansion of the Ottomány culture is associated with the end of the Hatvan culture. In The Rise of Bronze Age Society (2005) the archaeologists Krisitian Kristiansen and Thomas Larsson group various local Bronze Age archaeological cultures of the Carpathian Basin, such as Wietenberg, Vatya, Veterov and Madarovce under the term 'Ottomani Culture' for convenience.

== Habitat, settlements, housing and material culture ==
People belonging to this vast culture settled along river banks and in valleys but also on strategic places like mountain passes and hills used for mighty fortified settlements. Some places like caves and natural springs were used for cult activities. This culture was contemporary with Wietenberg culture in Romania, Unetice-Madarovce-Veterov-Boheimkirchen cultural complex in Moravia, Germany, Austria and western Slovakia, Mierzanowice culture in Poland and Makó/Nagyrév culture in Hungary.

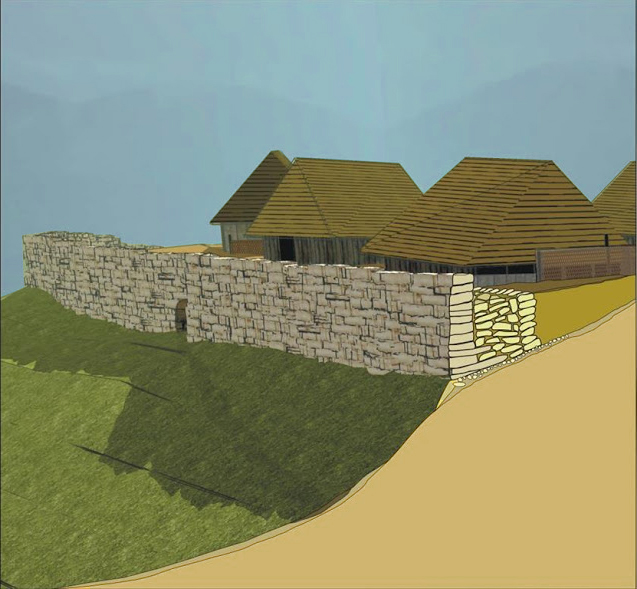
Fortified settlement at Góra Zyndrama, Poland, 1750 BC

The high cultural level is illustrated most by fortified settlements with highly advanced defensive architecture including ditches, stone walls, ramparts, towers and complicated gates protected by bastions, as well as by urbanistically organized houses (1, 2 or three rooms), tell disposition at lowland sites (consequent use of houses made of clay, creating an artificial hill with many stratigraphic levels), the high level of metal working (bronze, gold, silver), a high level of bone and antler working (including elements of horse harness made of antler), sophisticated pottery, often considered one of the most exquisite ceramic cultures of prehistoric Europe, with beautifully adorned amphorae, jugs, broad bowls, small cups, pottery of milk processing, and piraunoi - transportable ceramic ovens, richly decorated, often interpreted as being used not only for profane, but also cult activities (burning incense). Some distinctive features of Ottomány ceramics are decoration with spiral or circular motifs, rich plastic ornamentation, use of a wave pattern or pattern of "running spirals", polishing of pottery to reach "metallic effect" and high firing temperatures. Metalworking is illustrated by gold jewelry, mainly earrings, small bronze objects (pins, personal ornaments, small tools - needles, awls), military items include battle axes, spear-heads, daggers, knives, and arrowheads. Although stone was still widely used for sickles and working axes.

According to Anthony (2007), chariotry spread westwards to the Ottomány culture from the Multi-cordoned ware culture.

== Mortuary rite ==
Burials were typically inhumations with the body in a flexed position in large flat cemeteries in direct vicinity of settlements, with different sides for men and women, at the final stages shifting towards bi-ritual rites, with more cremations, using urns. Graves are equipped with rich grave goods, including personal adornments like beads (in male graves often made of animal teeth and boar tusks) and metal jewelry, tools, arms and ceramics. In a child grave at Nizna Mysla cemetery (Eastern Slovakia), a ceramic model of a four-wheel wagon was found and has been interpreted either as child's toy or a cult object.

== Collapse and legacy ==
The end of the Ottomány culture is connected with turbulent events at the end of Old Bronze Age in Central Europe, where there was a collapse of the whole "Old Bronze Age world" with its highly advanced culture of mighty hill-forts, rich burials, and trade over vast distances. The gradual decline in the number of fortified settlements, change of burial rites, and the decision of people to desert fortified settlements could have had several reasons, including the collapse of trade and exchange networks, the attacks of enemies, the internal collapse of society or environmental causes. The following Middle Bronze Age/Late Bronze Age cultures are very different in their burial rites (cremation, erecting of barrows) as well as in their handling of bronze - there is an "explosion" in bronze working, and many bronze hoards found across all of Europe illustrate this change in quantity and quality of produced bronze objects. We see not only bronze ornaments and arms (including first examples of swords), but also bronze tools (sickles, axes, adzes), which changed the everyday life of prehistoric man.

== Gallery ==
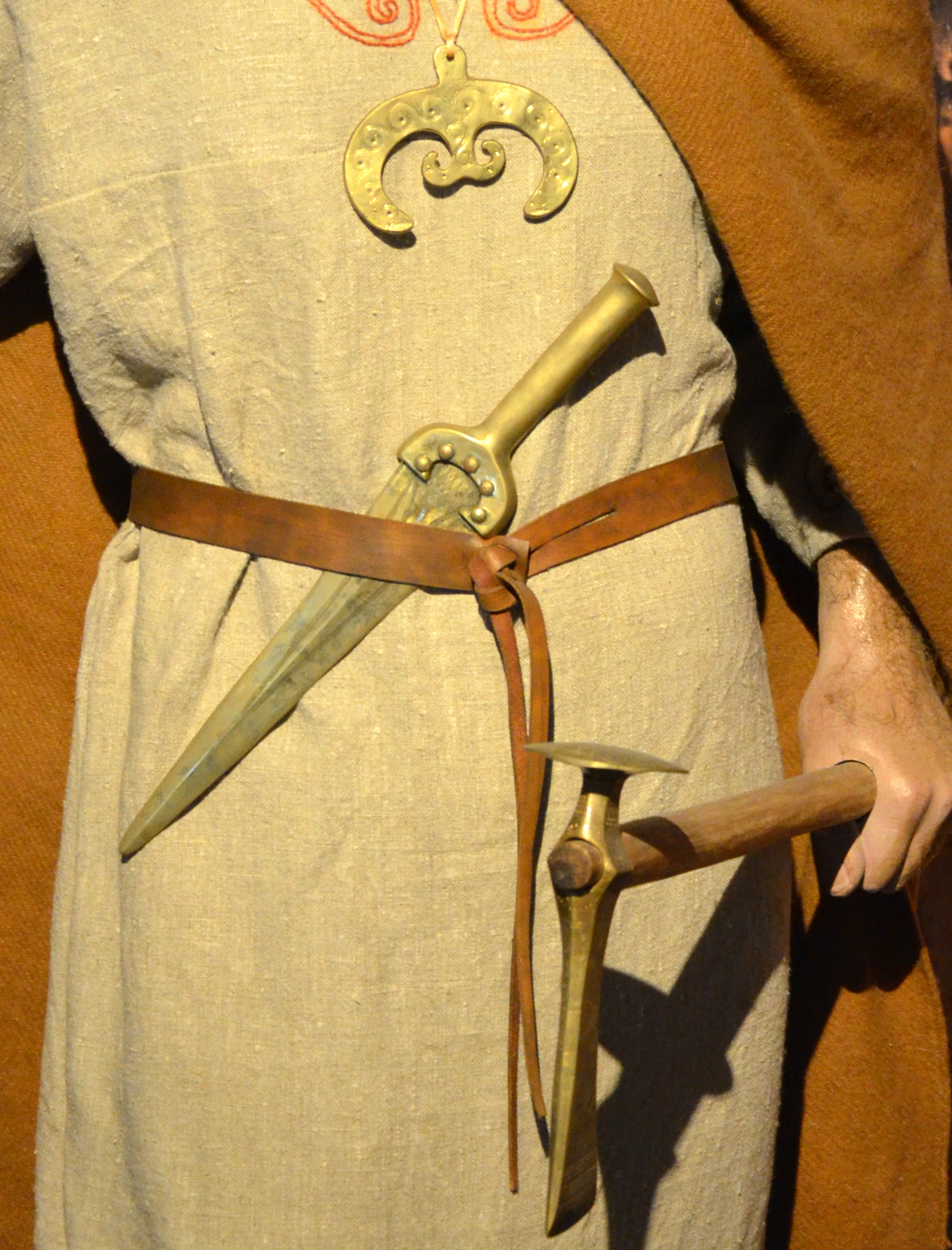
Reconstructed bronze dagger, axe and pendant

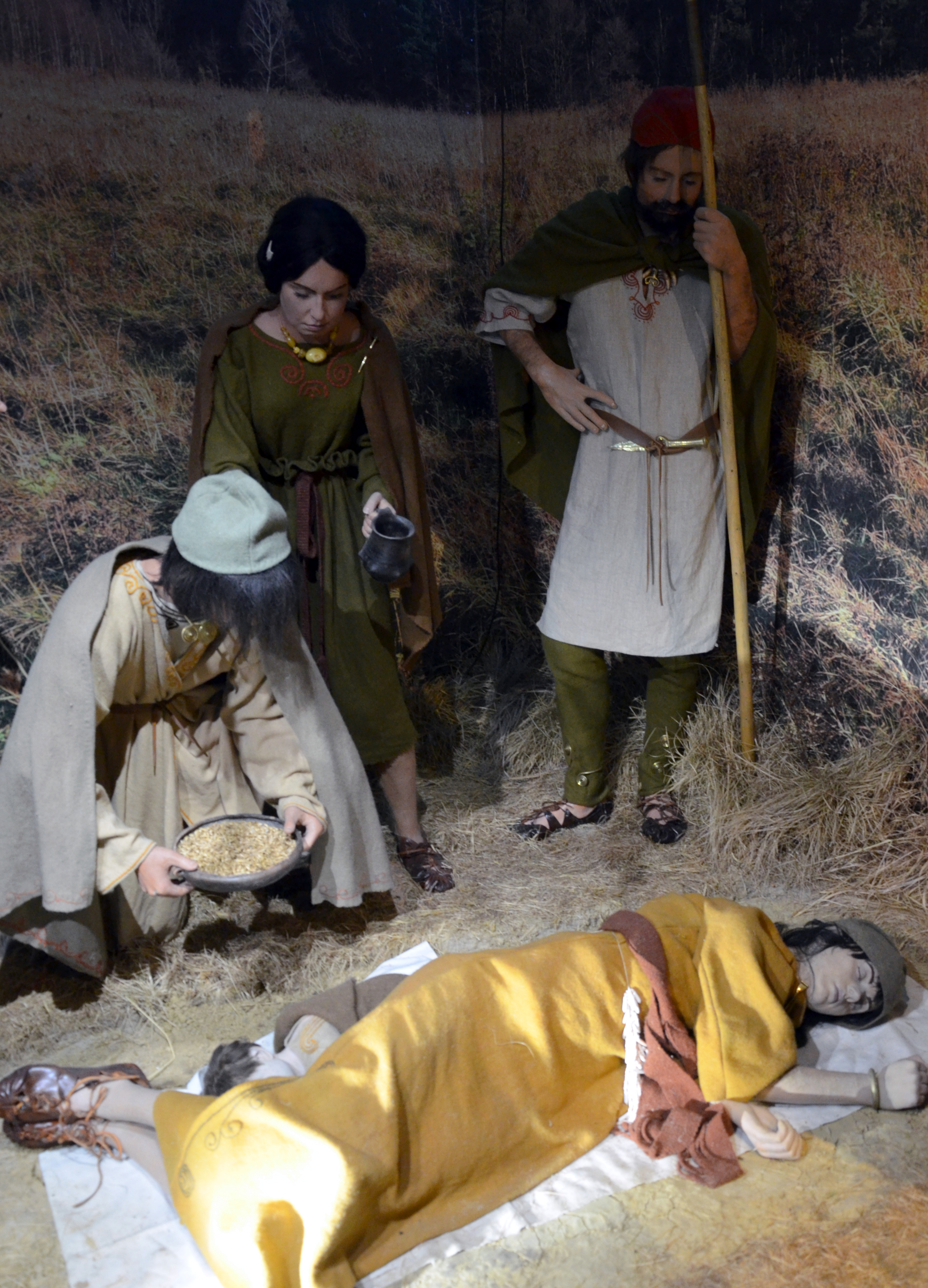
Burial reconstruction, Poland

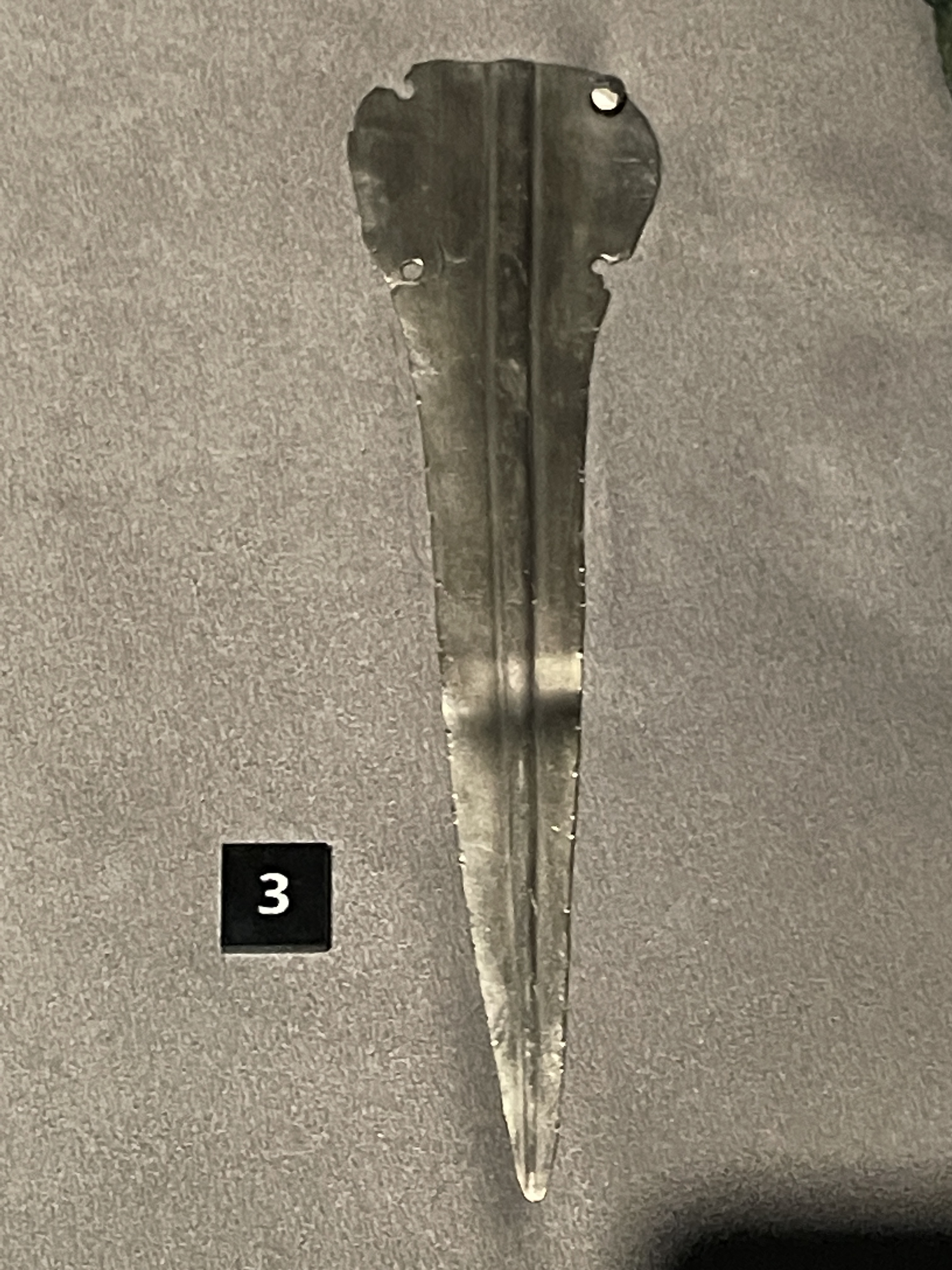
Silver dagger, Hungary

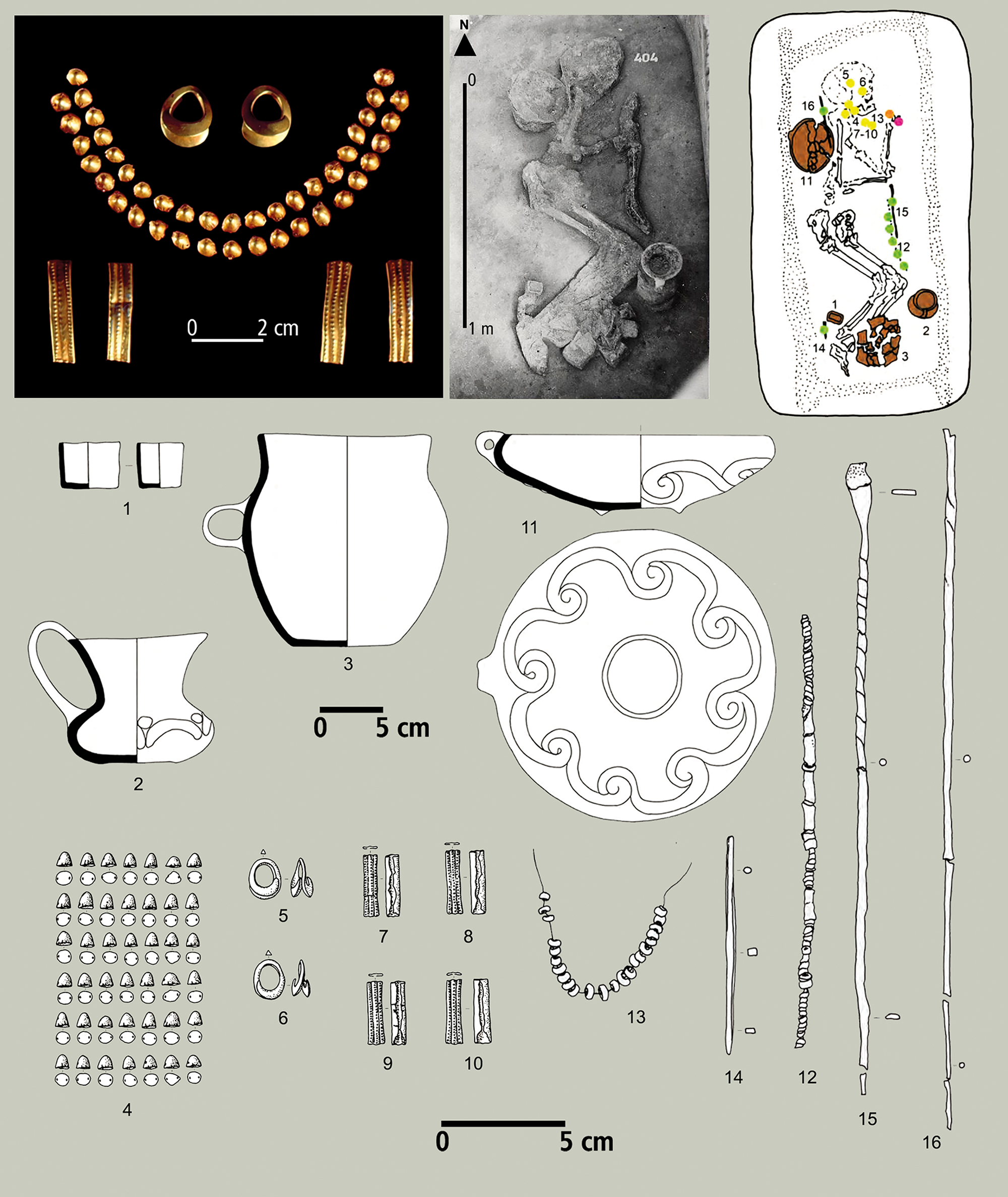
Burial goods from Nižná Myšľa, Slovakia

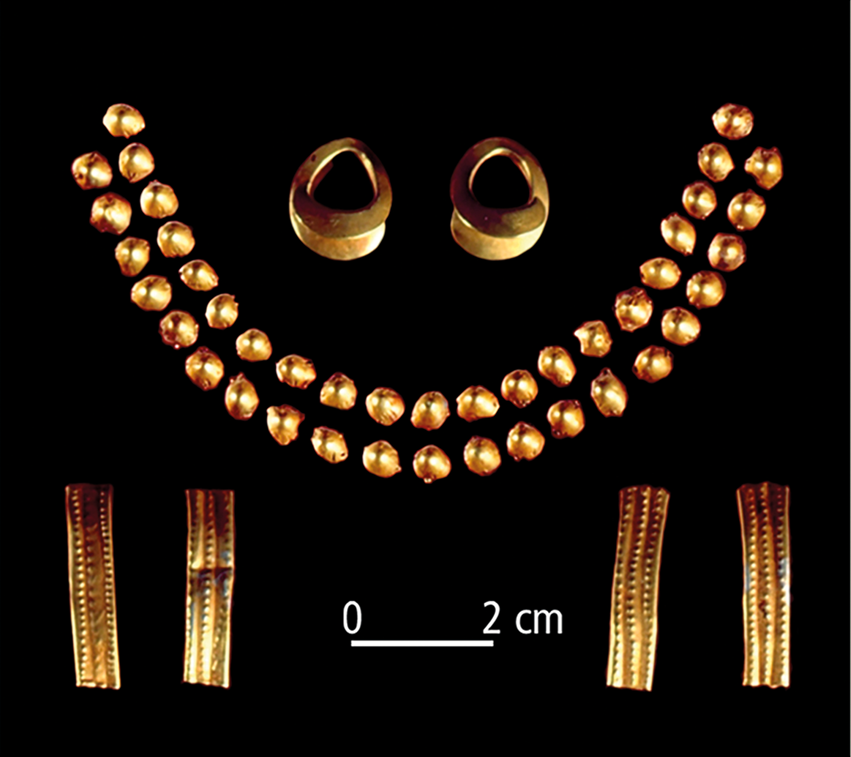
Gold burial goods from Nižná Myšľa

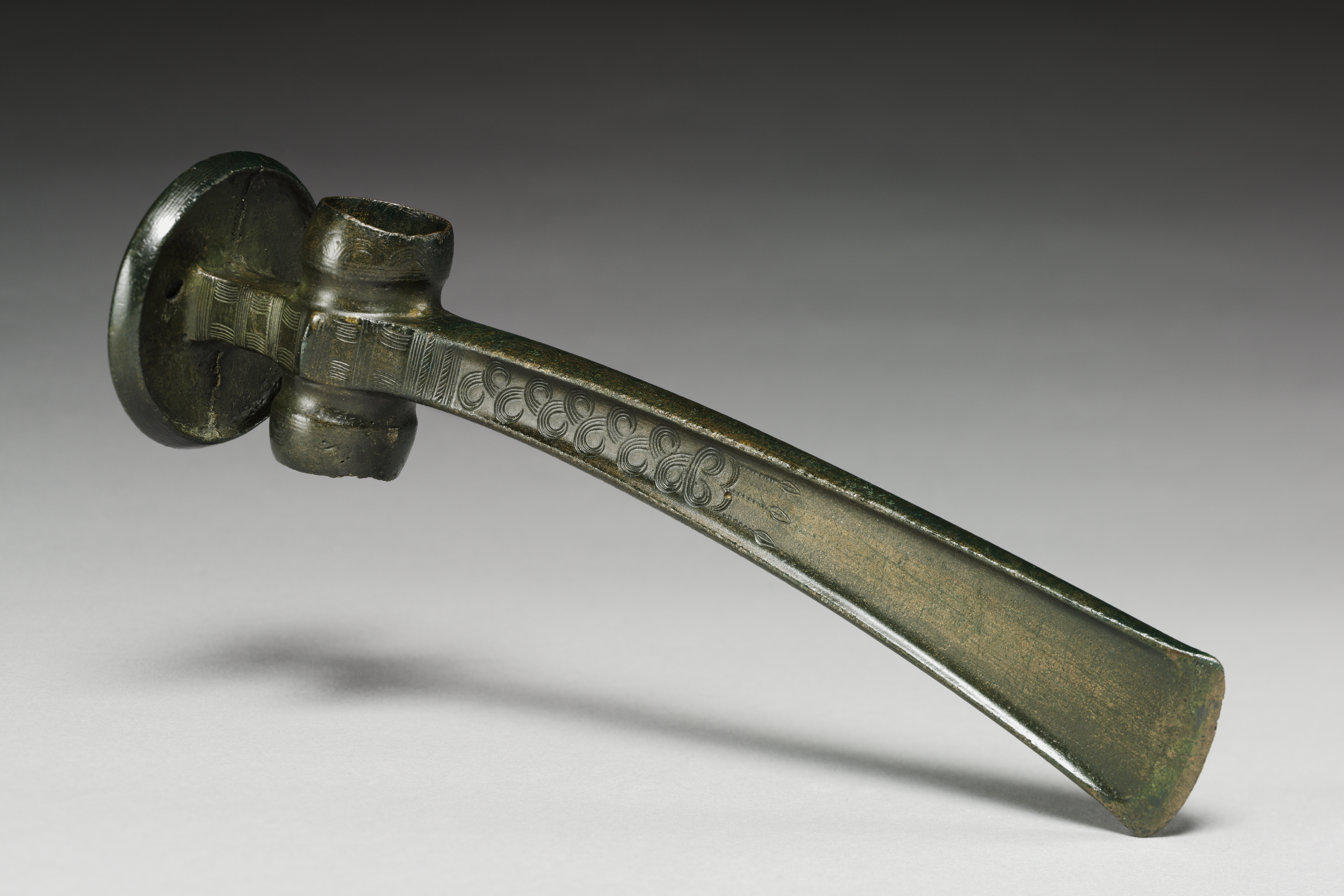
Bronze battle-axe, Hungary, c. 1500 BC

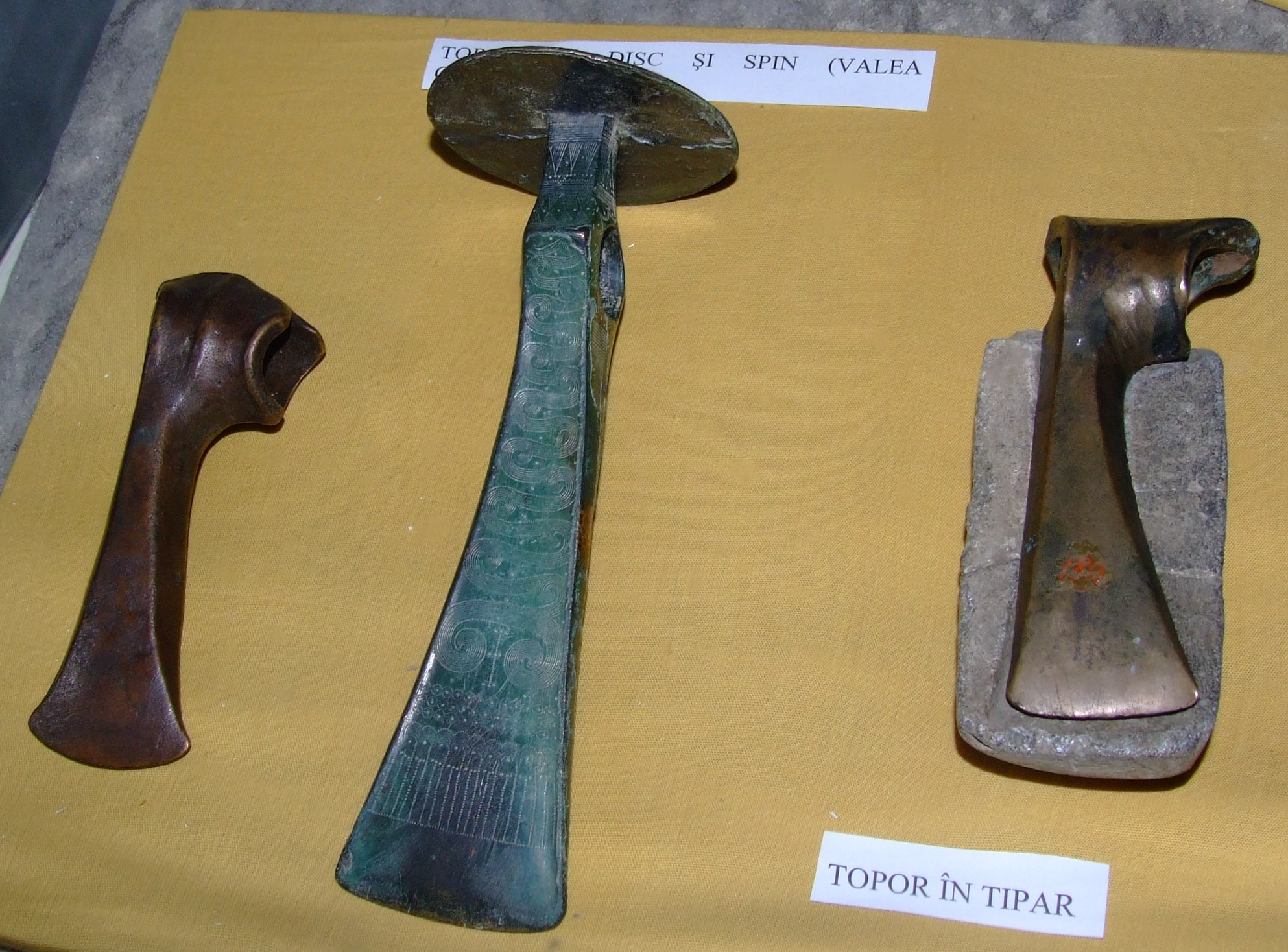
Decorated axe, Romania

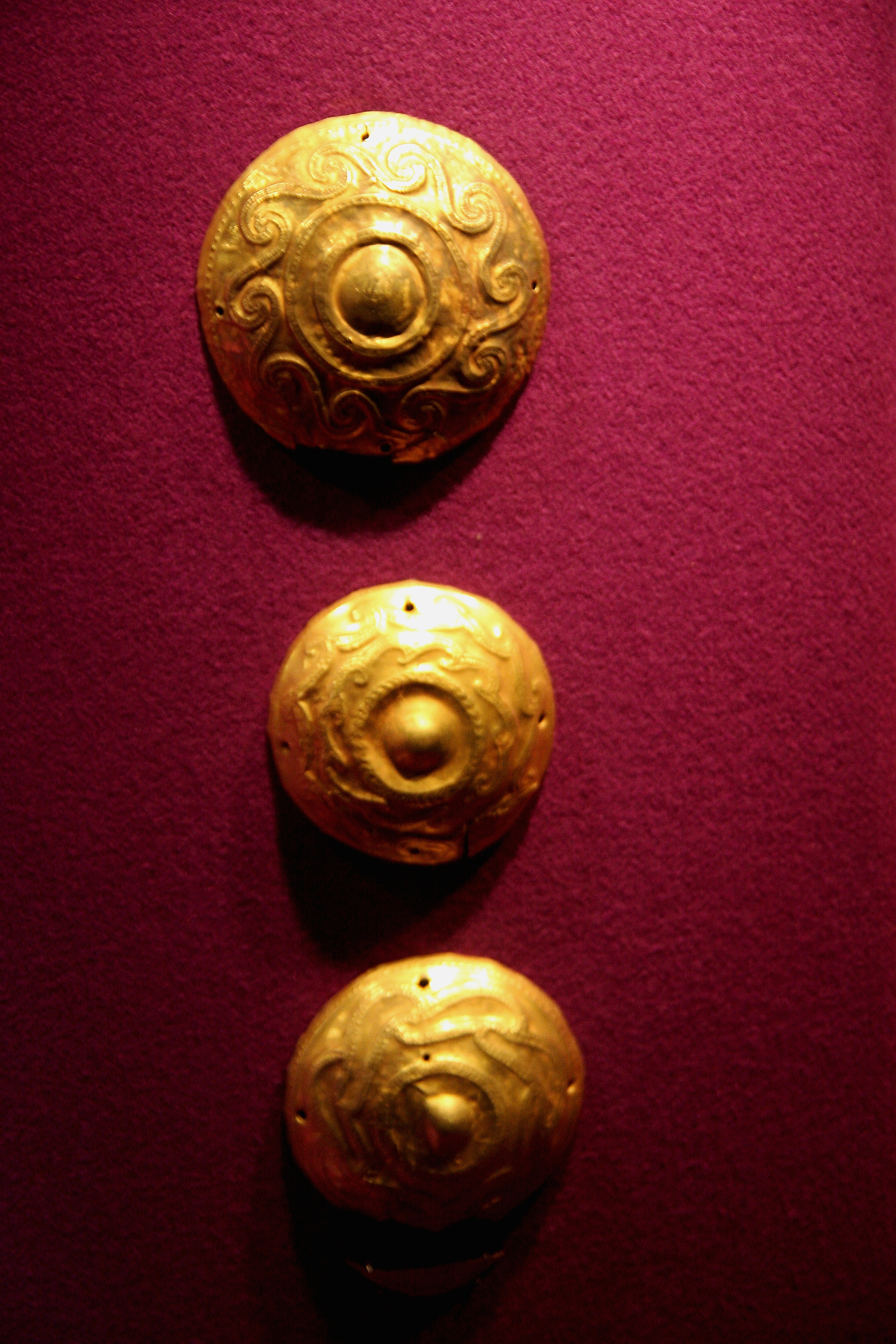
Gold discs from Sacueni, Romania.

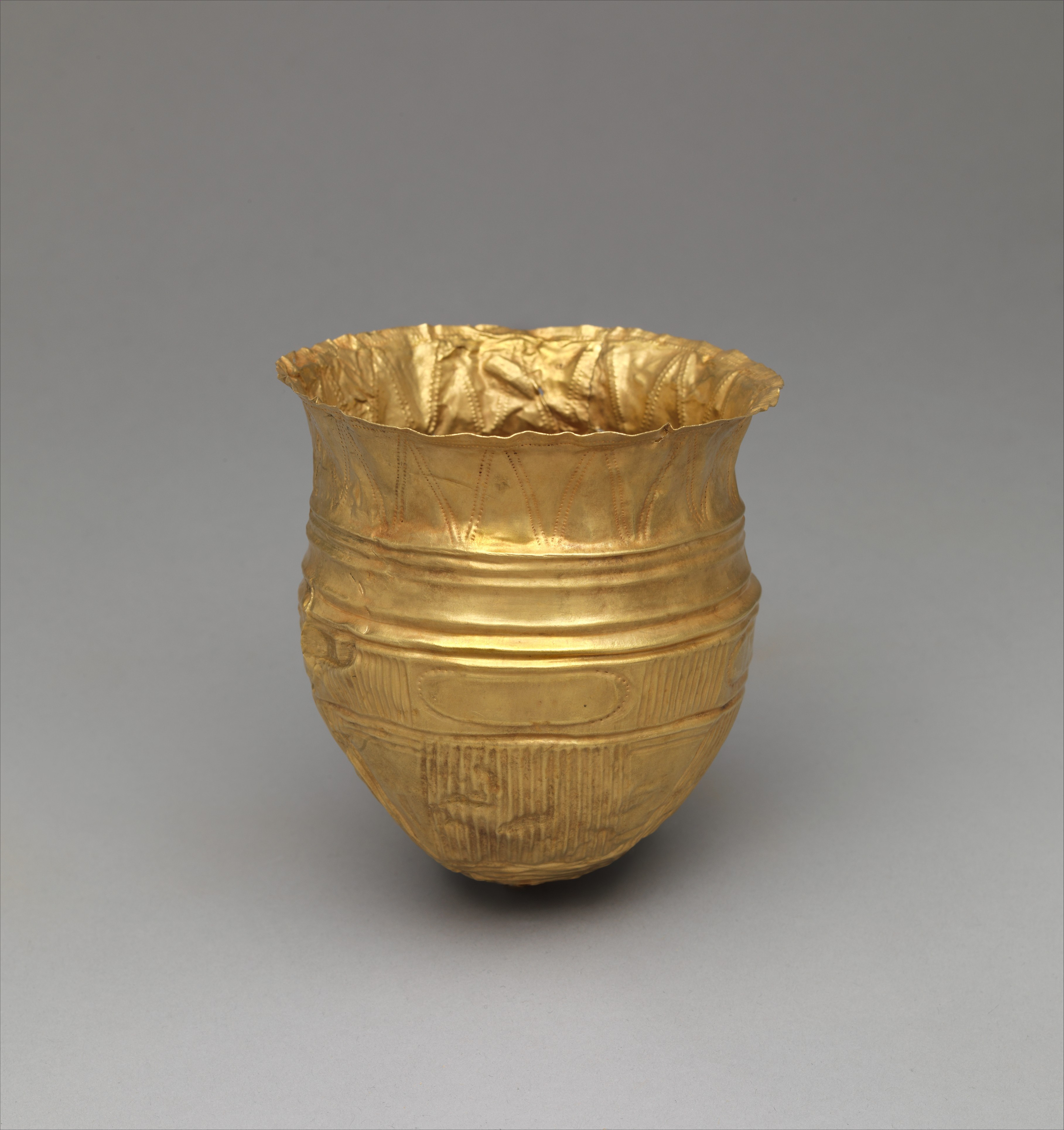
Gold cup, c. 1750-1500 BC

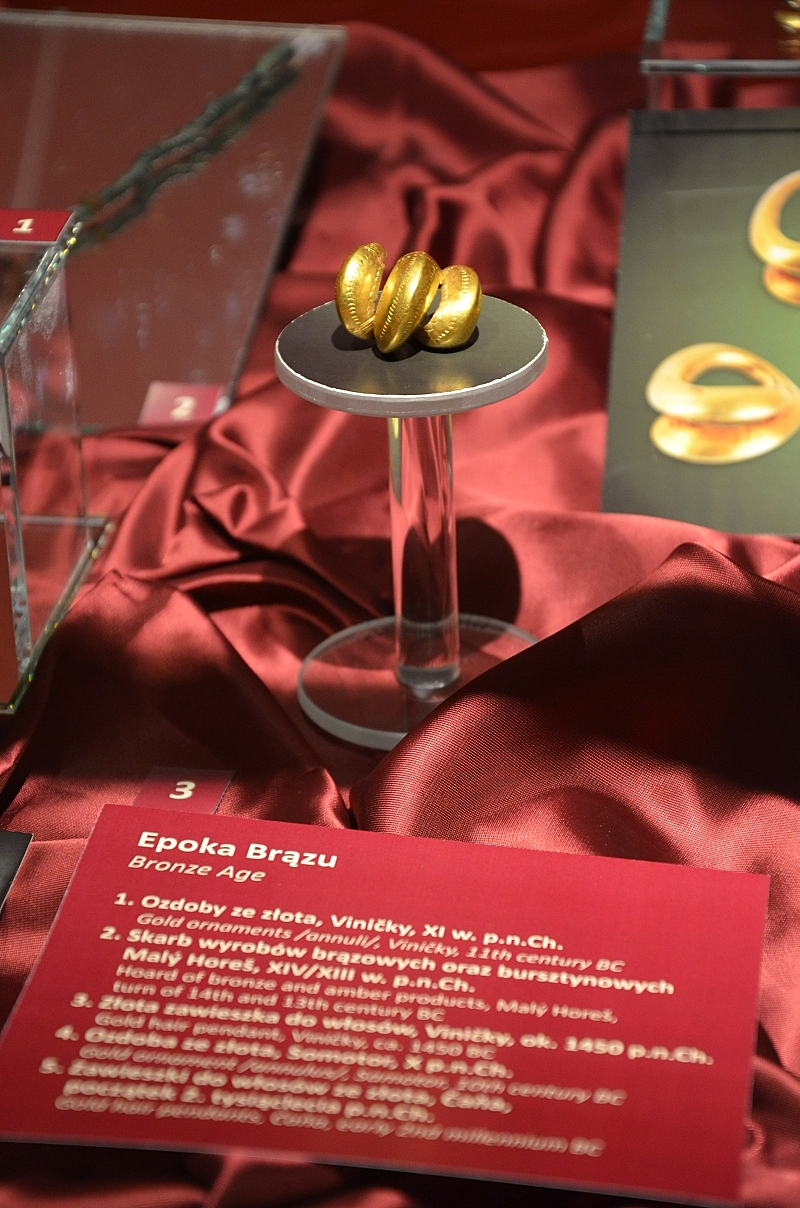
Gold hair ring, Slovakia, 1450 BC

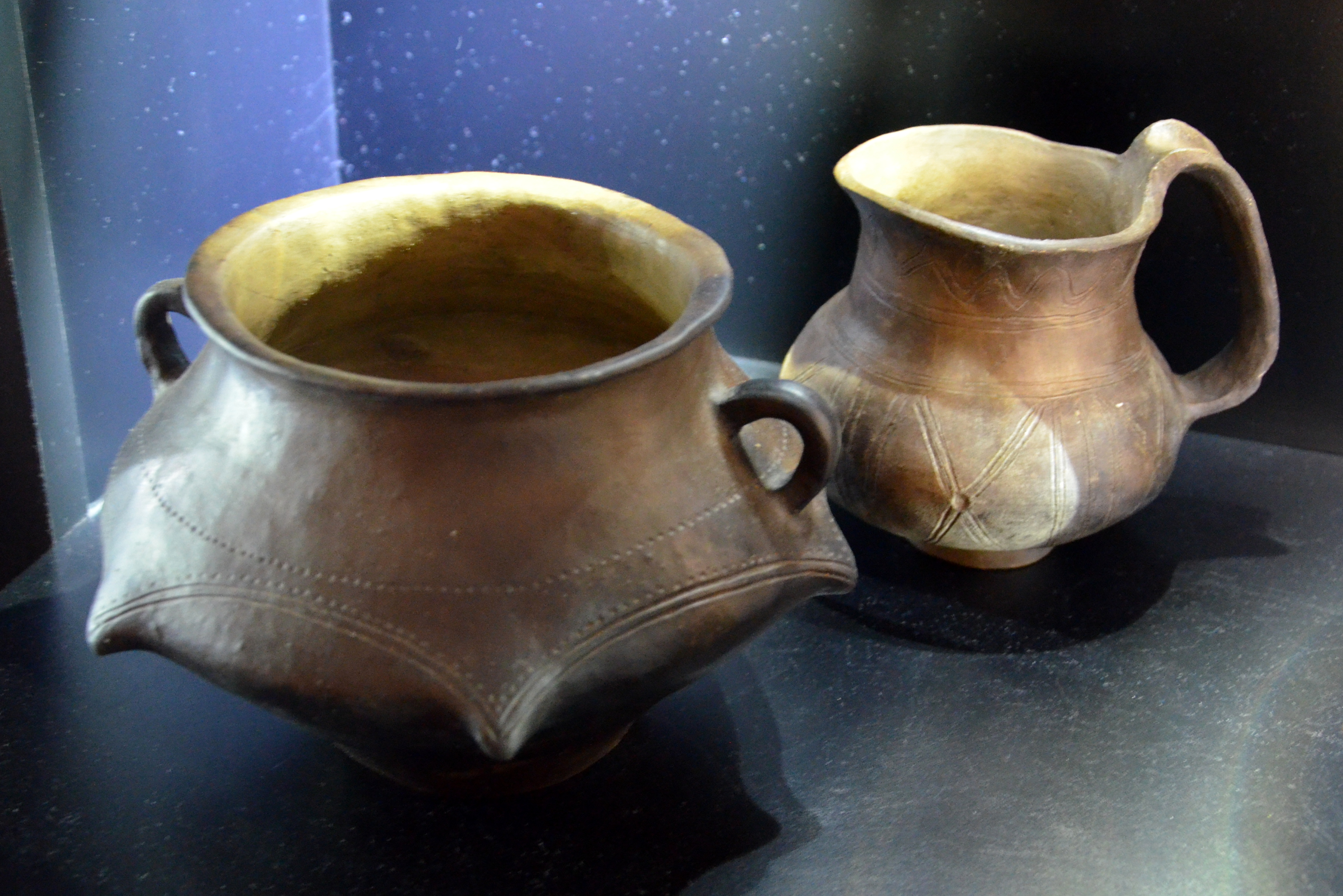
Pottery, Poland

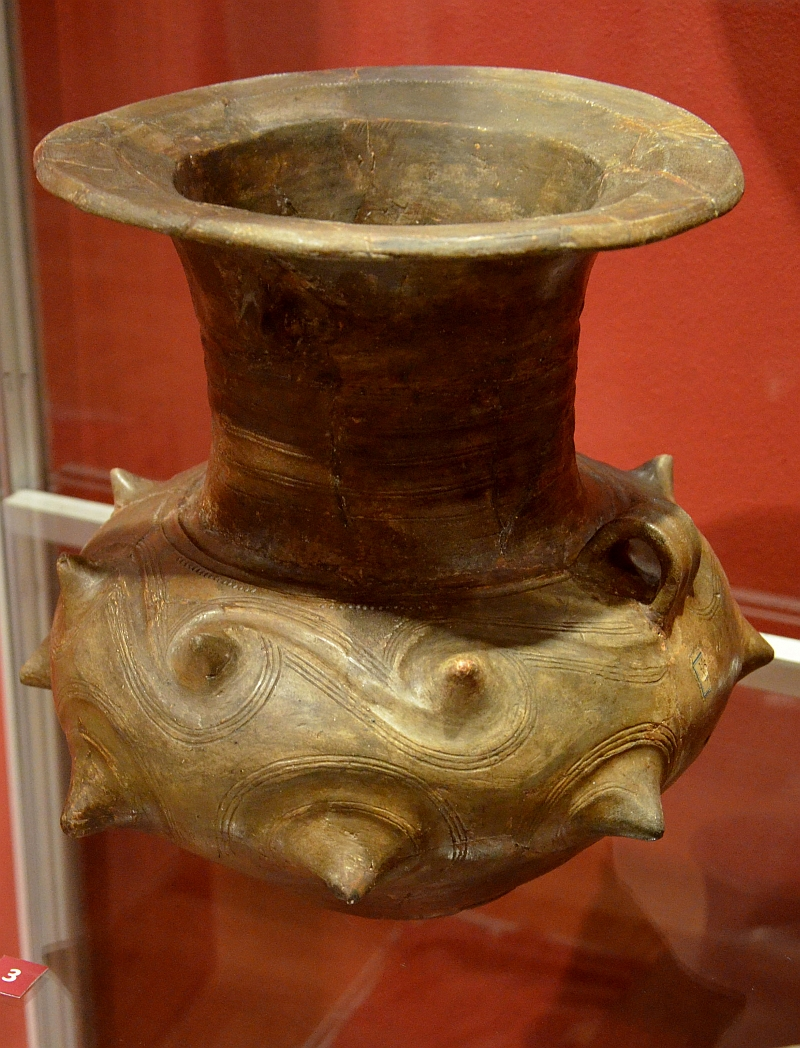
Pottery from Barca, Slovakia

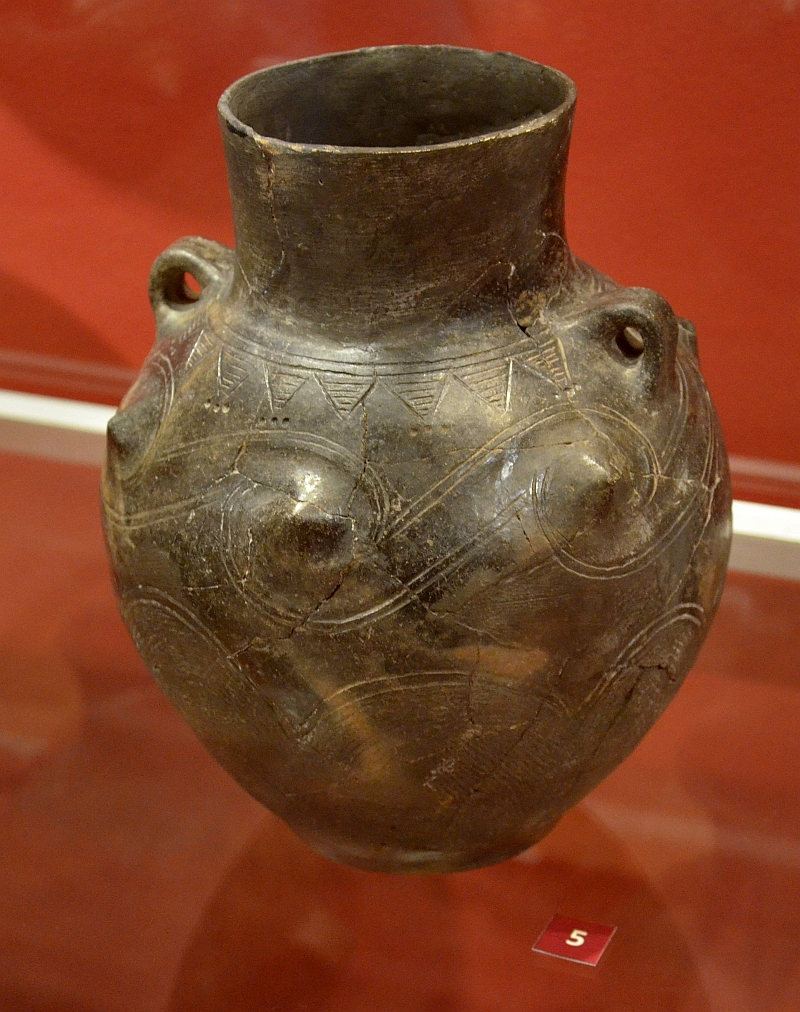
Ceramic amphora, Slovakia, c. 1600 BC

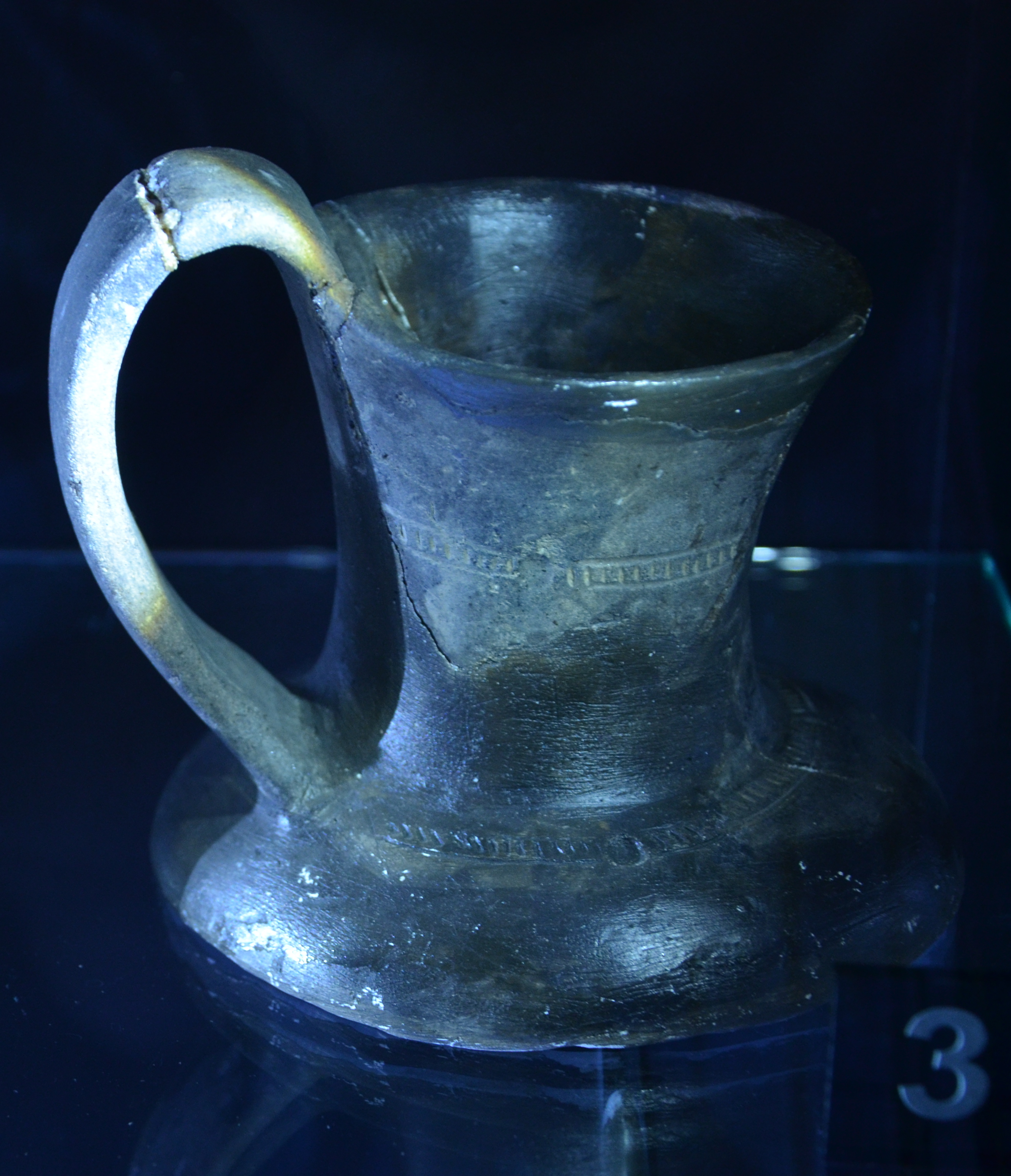
Ceramic jug, Poland

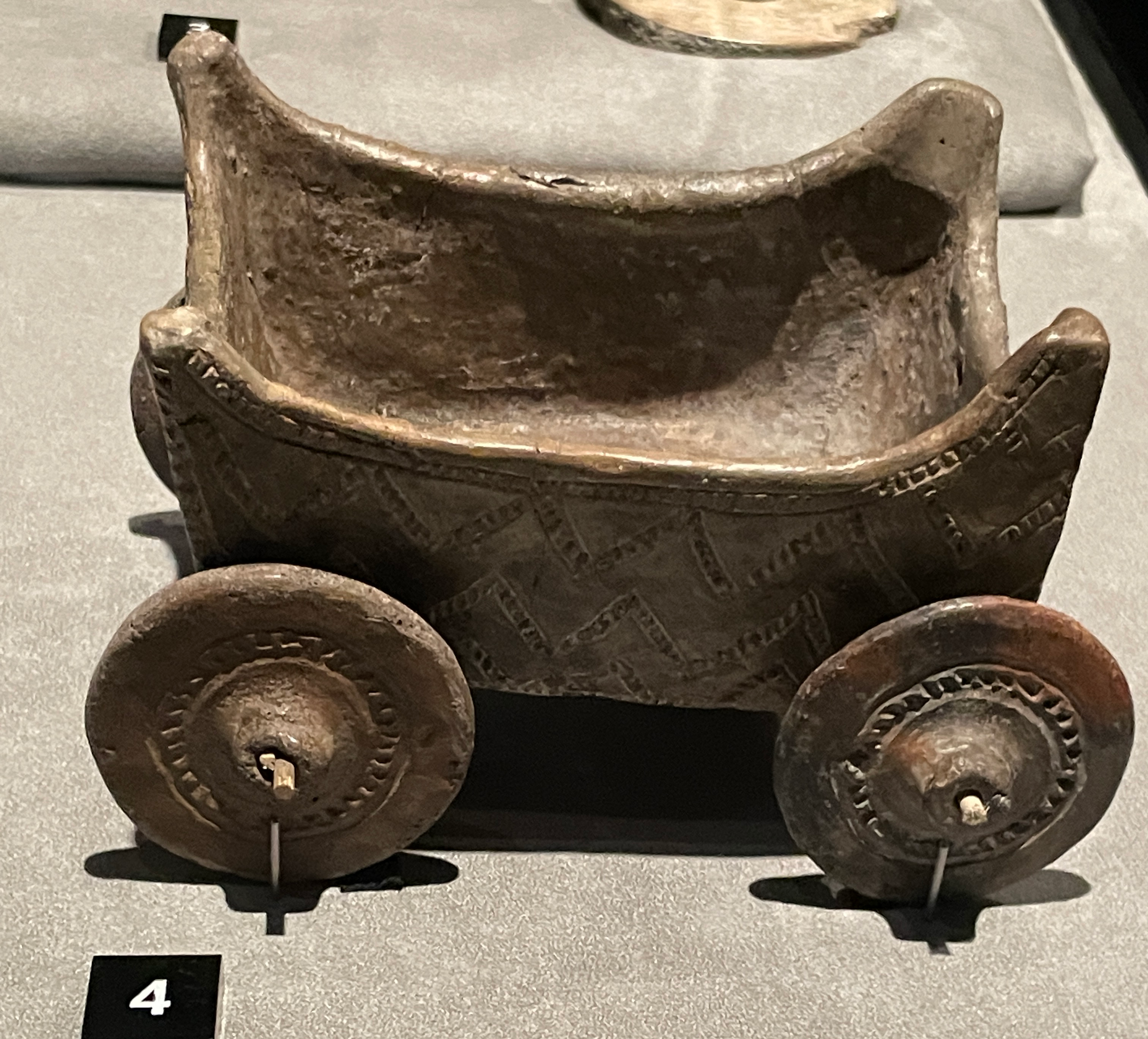
Ceramic wagon model from Pocsaj, Hungary, 2100–1900 BC

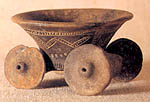
Ceramic wagon model from Nizna Mysla, Slovakia

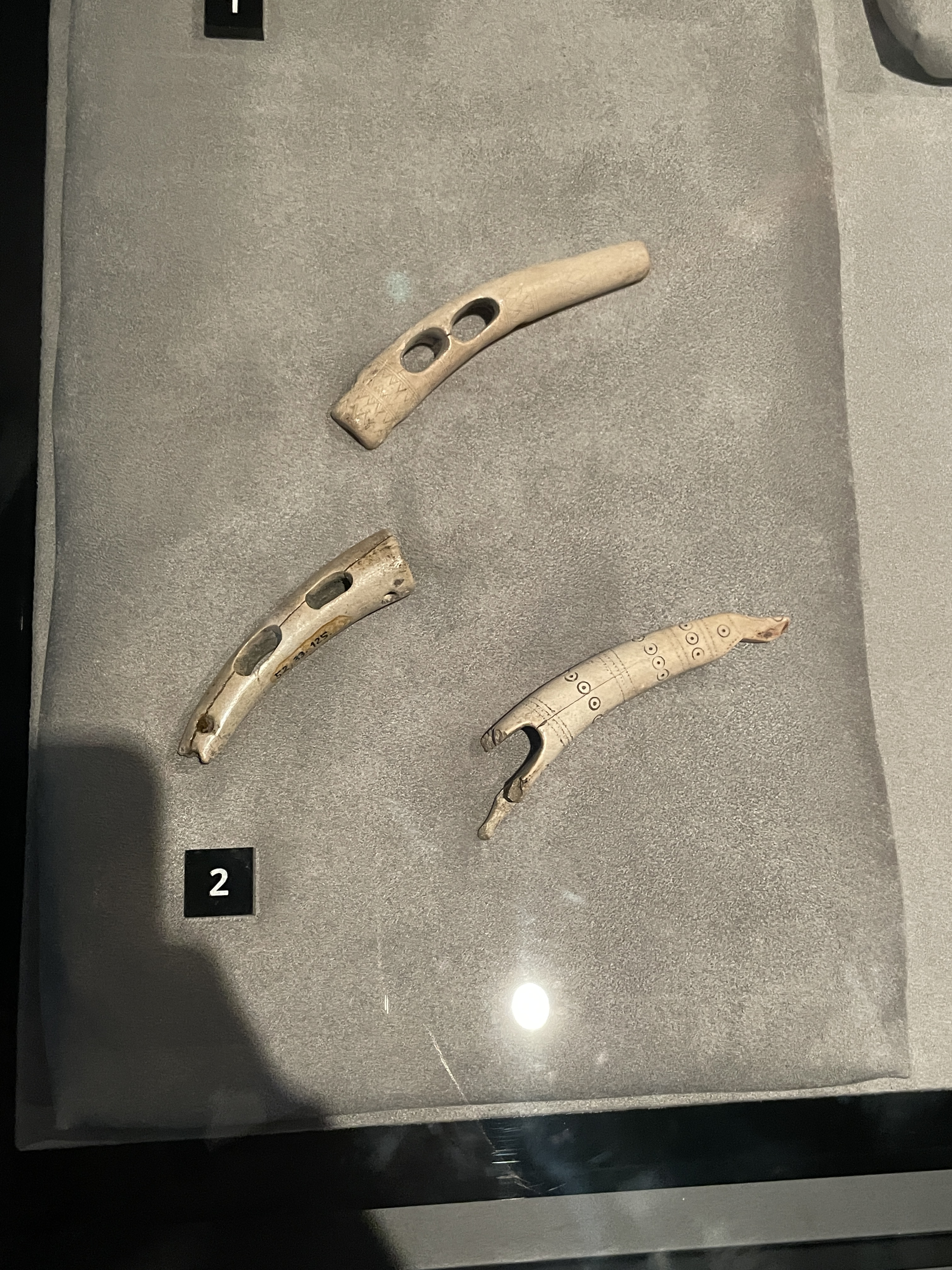
Horse bridle parts made from antler, Hungary

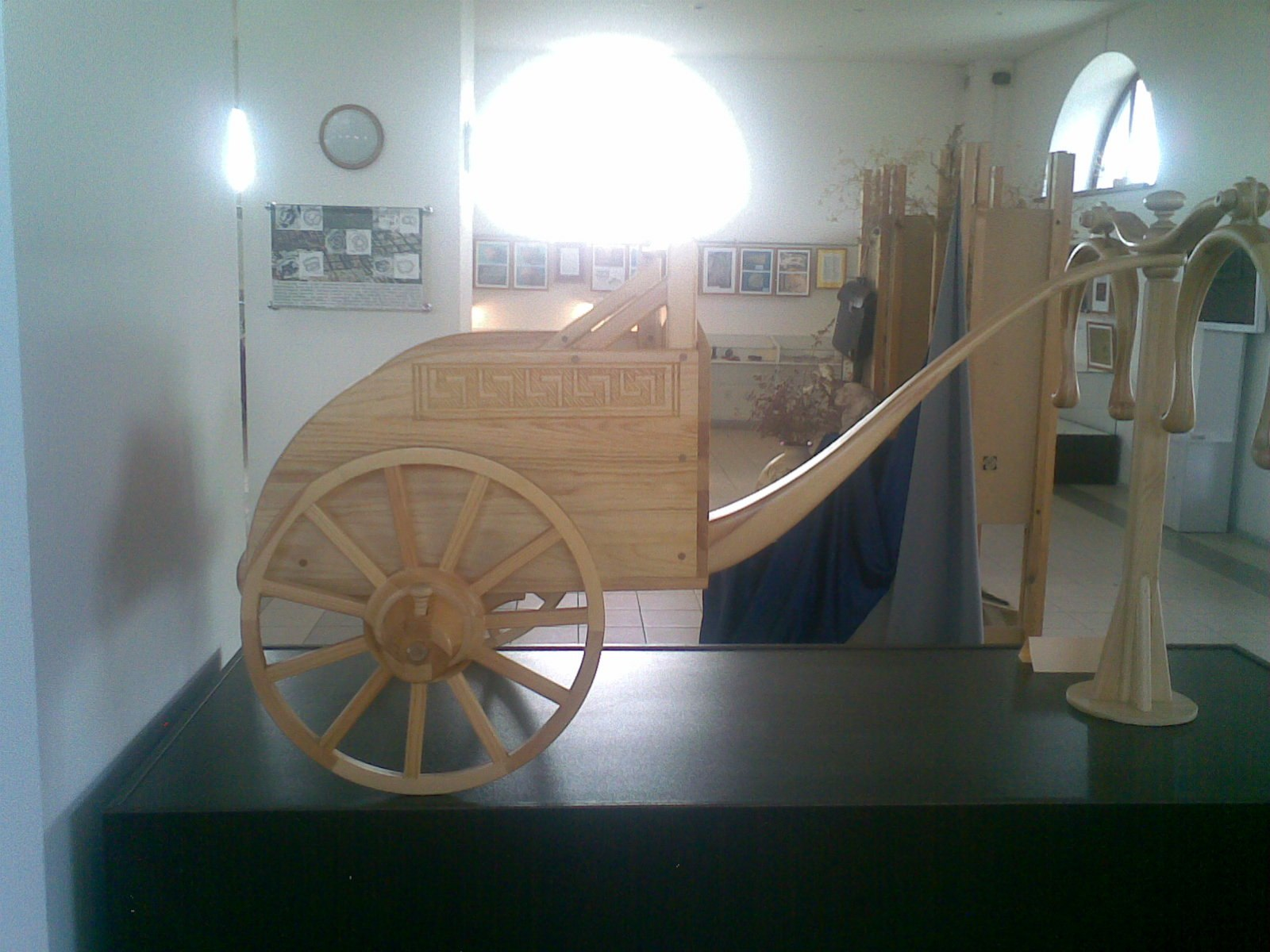
Chariot model, Arkaim museum

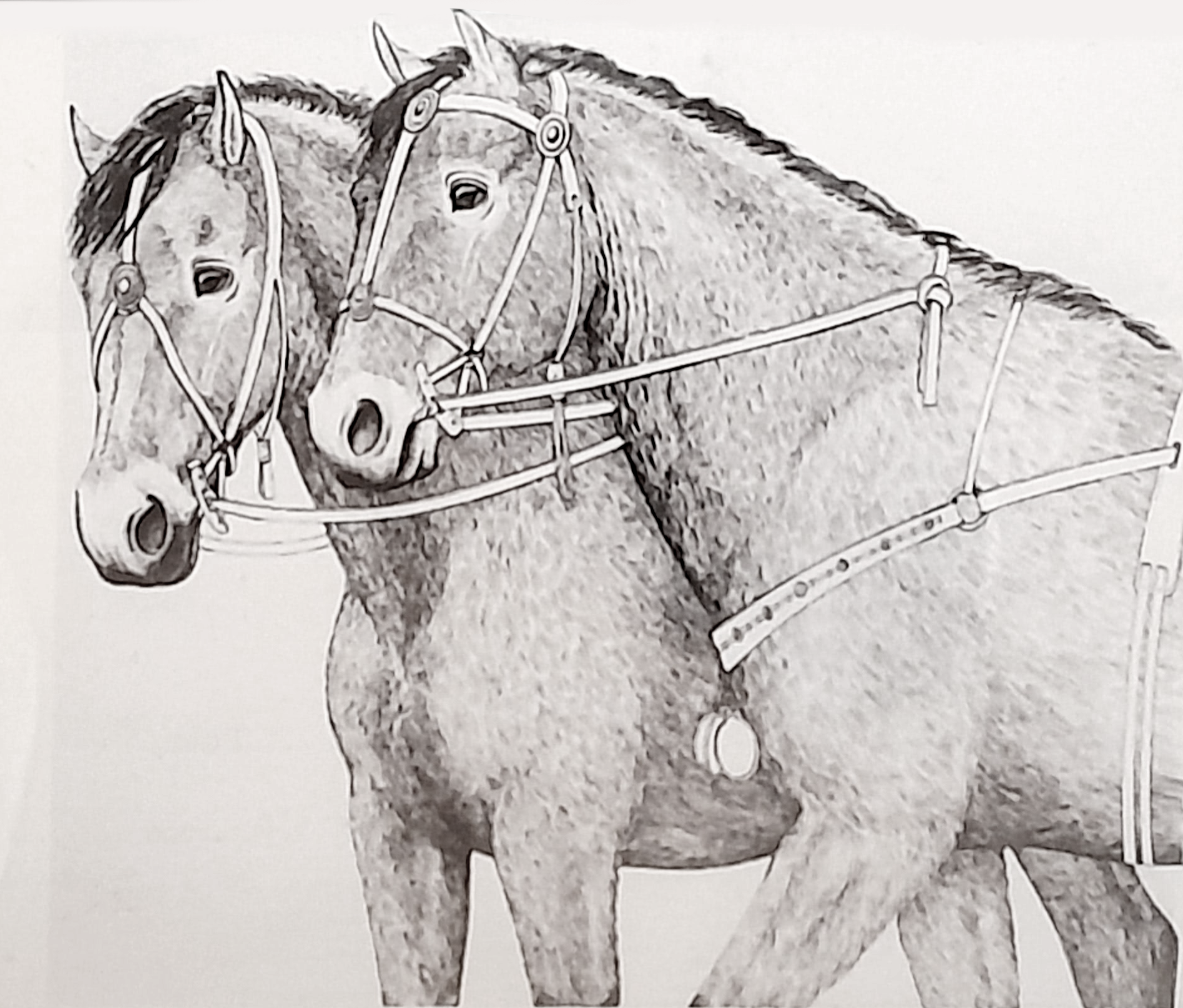
Bronze Age horse bridles

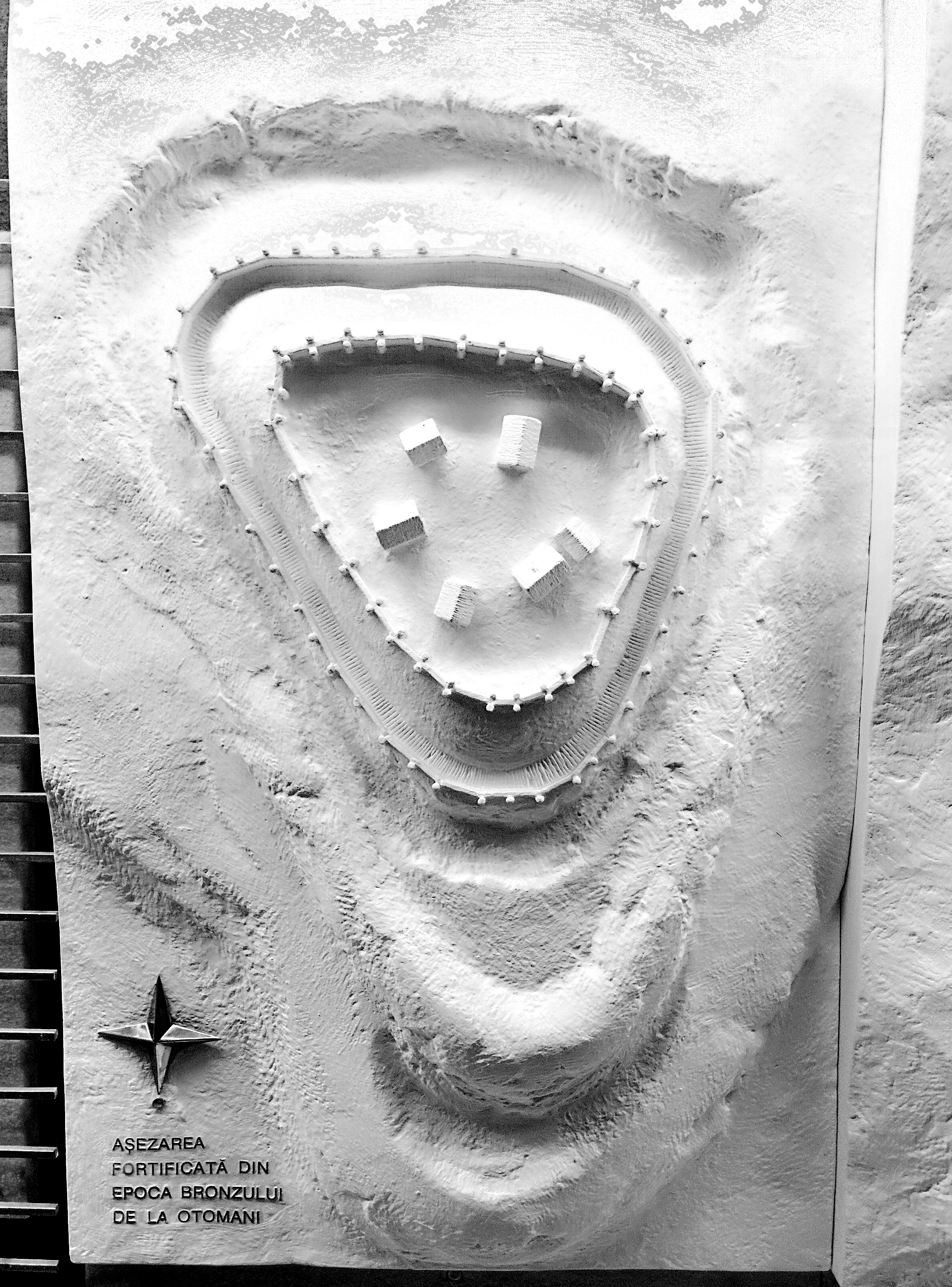
Otomani fortified settlement, Romania

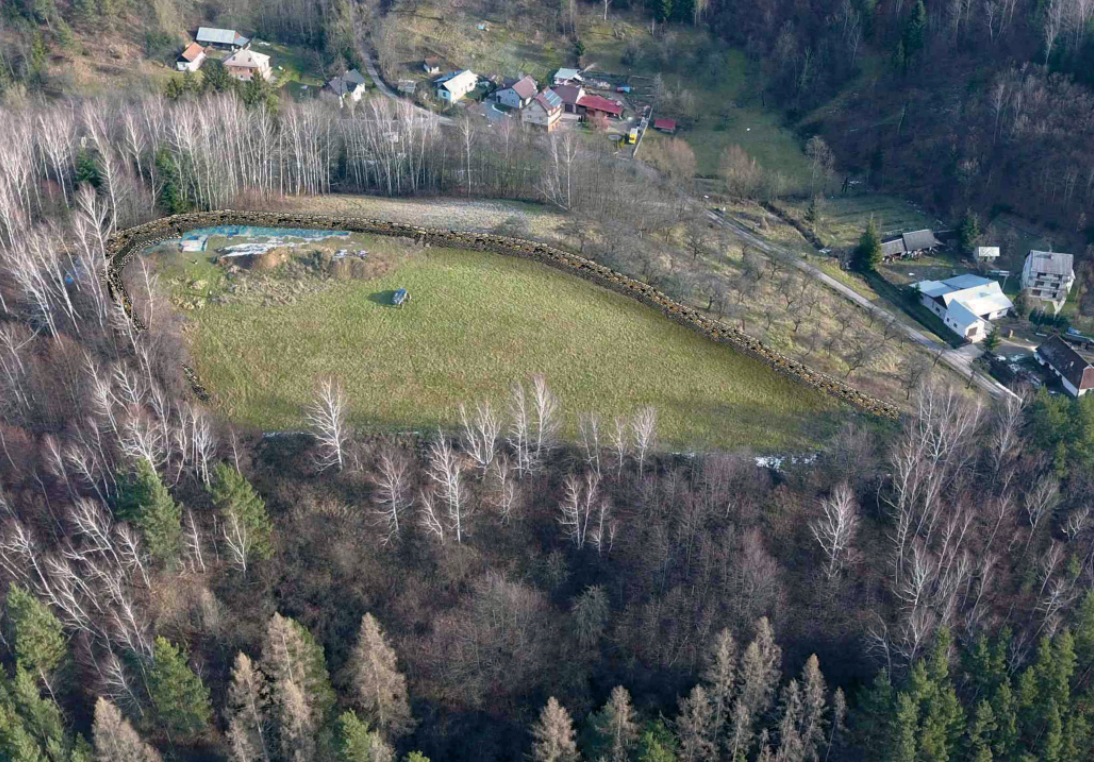
Zyndram's Hill, Poland, with wall reconstruction

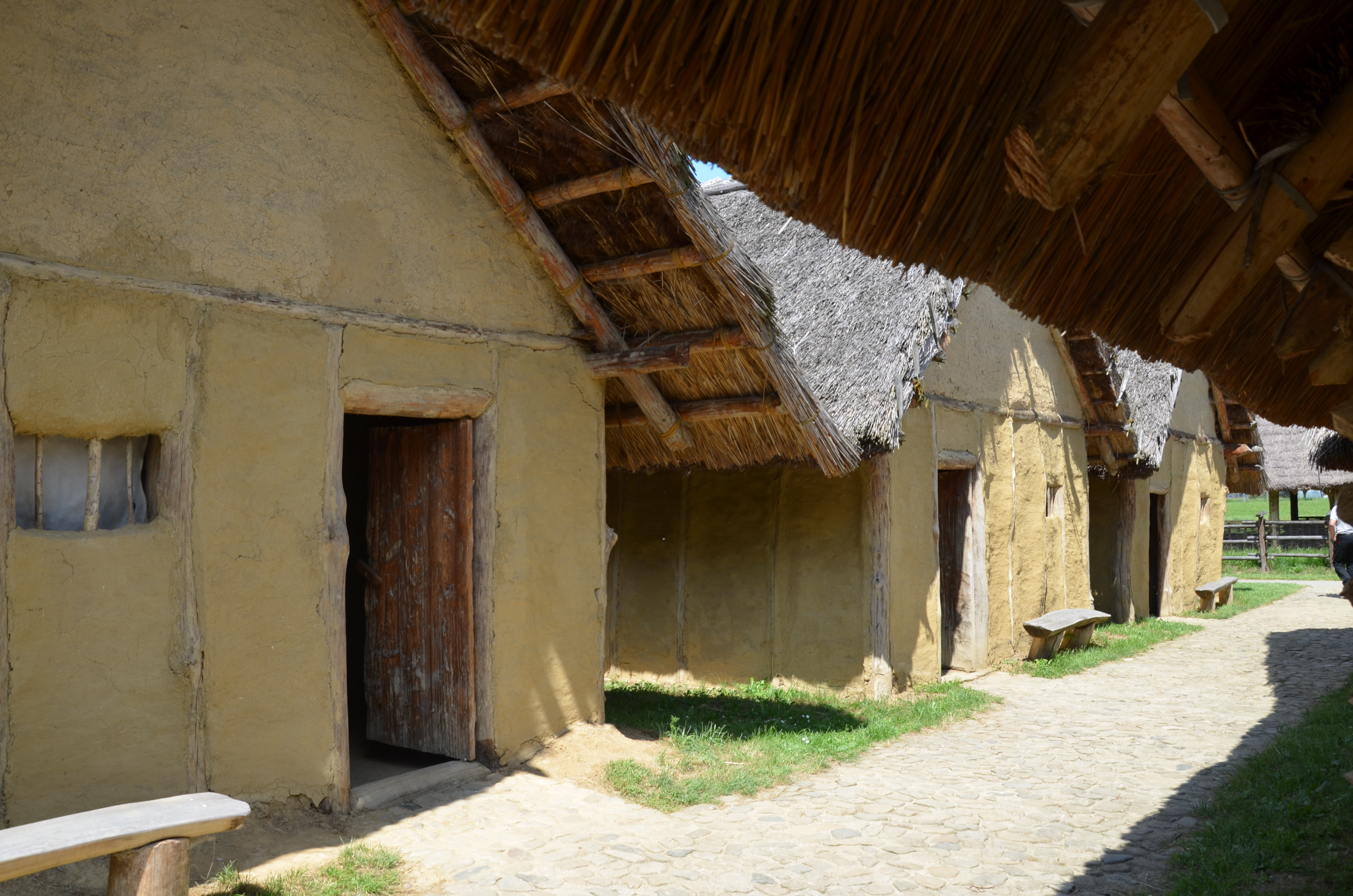
Reconstructed houses, Trzcinica, Poland

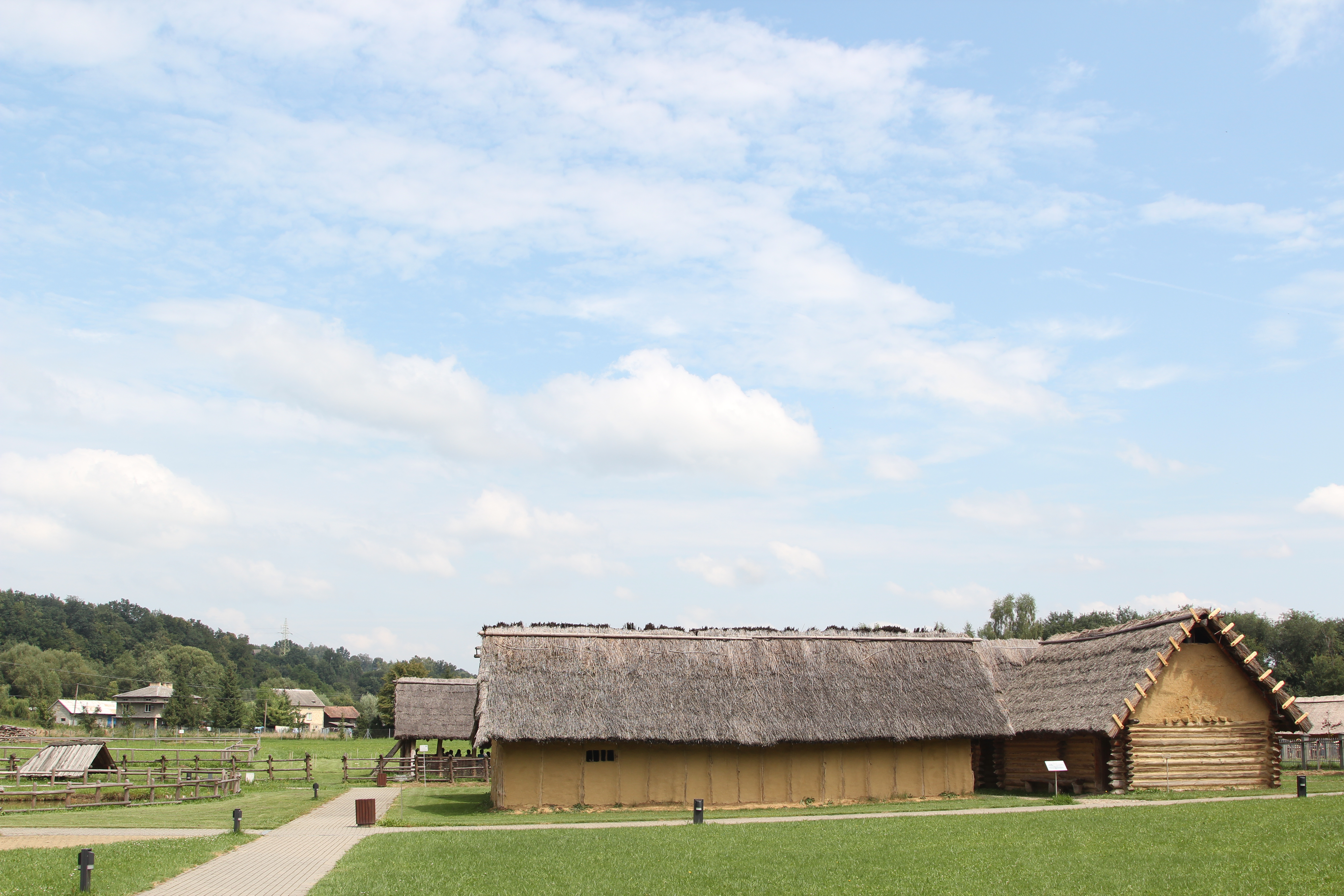
Reconstructed houses, Trzcinica, Poland

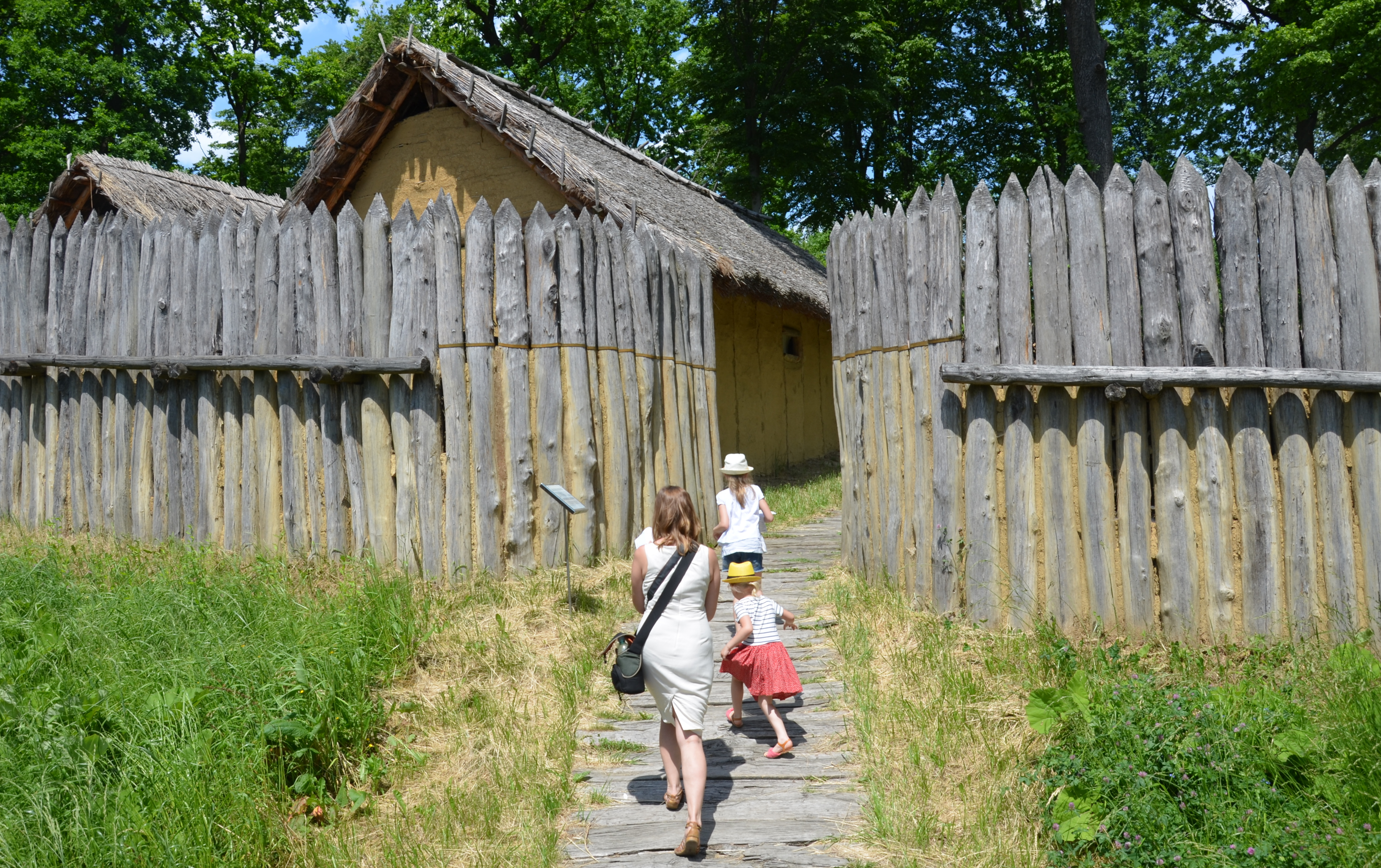
Reconstructed pallisade fortifications at Trzcinica

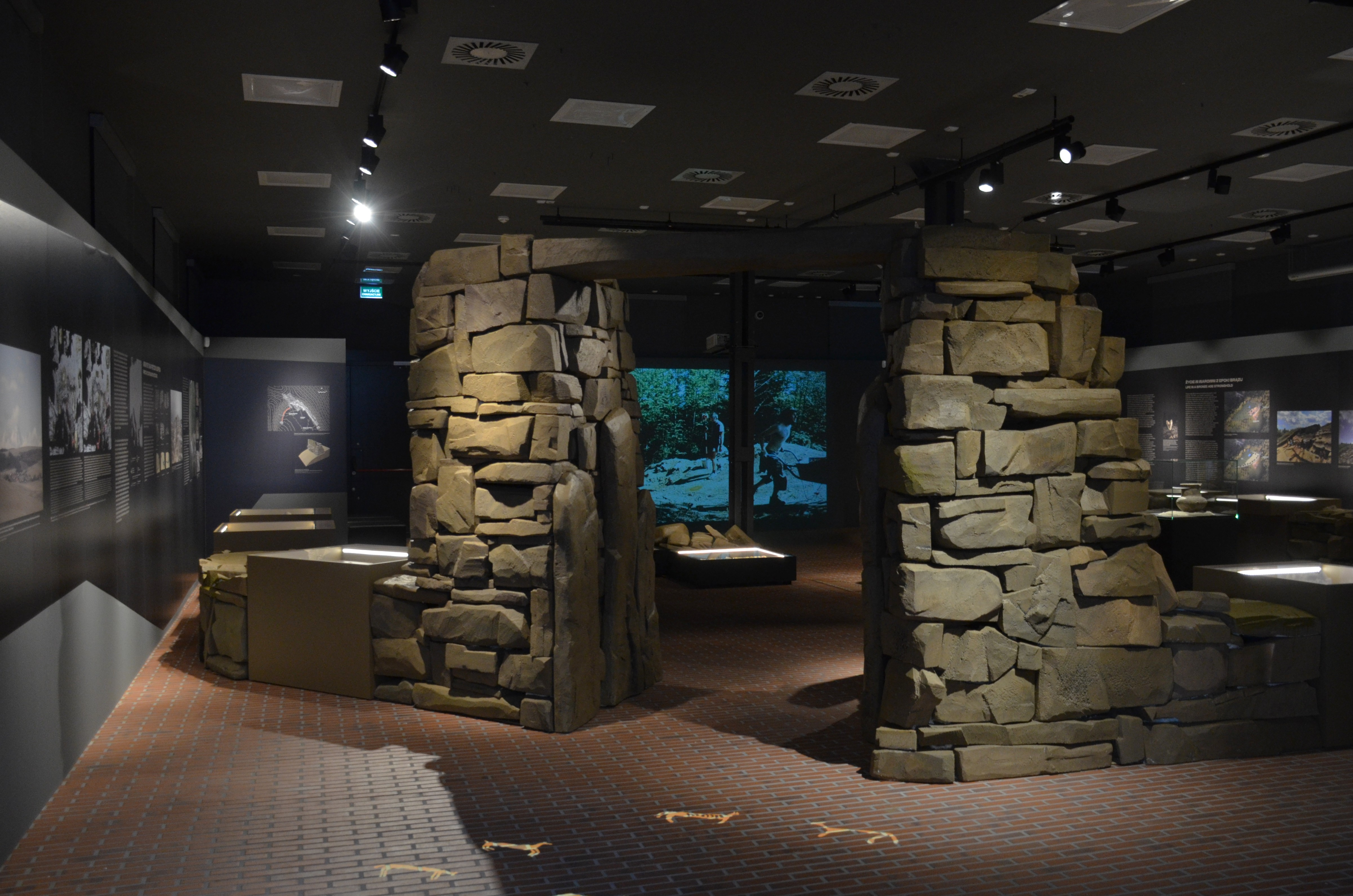
Reconstruction of a stone gateway at Góra Zyndrama, Poland

== See also ==
- Bronze Age Europe
- Bronze Age in Romania
- Prehistory of Transylvania
- Bronze Age in Poland
- History of Slovakia - Bronze Age
- Maros culture
- Wietenberg culture
- Tei culture
- Vatya culture
- Vatin culture
- Encrusted Pottery culture
- Hatvan culture
- Mad'arovce culture
- Monteoru culture
- Unetice culture
- Bronze Age Britain
- Argaric culture
- Sintashta culture
- Catacomb culture
- Aegean civilization
- History of Hungary - Bronze Age
