= Venus of Moravany =

Venus figurine found in Slovakia

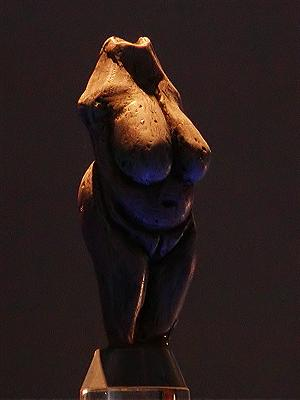
- A Venus from Moravany nad Váhom, which dates back to 22,800 BC
- Material: Mammoth ivory
- Created: 24,800 years ago
- Discovered: 1930; Slovakia

The Venus of Moravany (Slovak: Moravianska venuša) is a small prehistoric Venus figurine discovered in Slovakia in the early 20th century.

It was ploughed up in 1930 by farmer Štefan Hulman-Petrech near the village of Moravany nad Váhom in Slovakia.

It is made of mammoth tusk ivory and is dated to 22,800 BP, (the Gravettian).

A copy of this Venus currently resides in the Bratislava Castle exposition of the Slovak National Museum.

== Origin of the 'Venus' name ==
=== Goddess of Beauty and Fertility ===
The Venus of Moravany received the name 'Venus' due to Upper Palaeolithic female figurines collectively being named "Venus figurines." This derives from the Roman goddess of beauty, Venus. The expression, "Venus", was first used in the mid-nineteenth century by the Marquis de Vibraye, who discovered an ivory figurine and named it La Vénus impudique or Venus Impudica ("immodest Venus"). Despite considerable diversity in opinion amongst archeologists and in paleoanthropological literature as to the function and significance of the figures, the name arises from the assumption that the figurines represent an ancient ideal of beauty. This perception is said to have derived from the fact that attention is directed to certain features common to most of the figurines, particularly emotionally charged primary and secondary sexual characteristics such as the breasts, stomachs and buttocks. However, somewhat ironically, the figurines majorly predate the mythological figure of Venus. As a result, critics, such as Vandewettering, have highlighted that this could be a reflection of Androcentric interpretations of the Venus figurines that, she suggests, were the starting point for archaeological understandings.

== See also ==
- Art of the Upper Paleolithic
- List of Stone Age art
- Venus of Hradok
- Venus of Willendorf
