= Nitriansky Hrádok =

Coordinates: 48°04′09″N 18°12′17″E

Nitriansky Hrádok is a district of a town of Šurany, Slovakia. This settlement was annexed to Šurany in 1976.

== Archaeological site ==
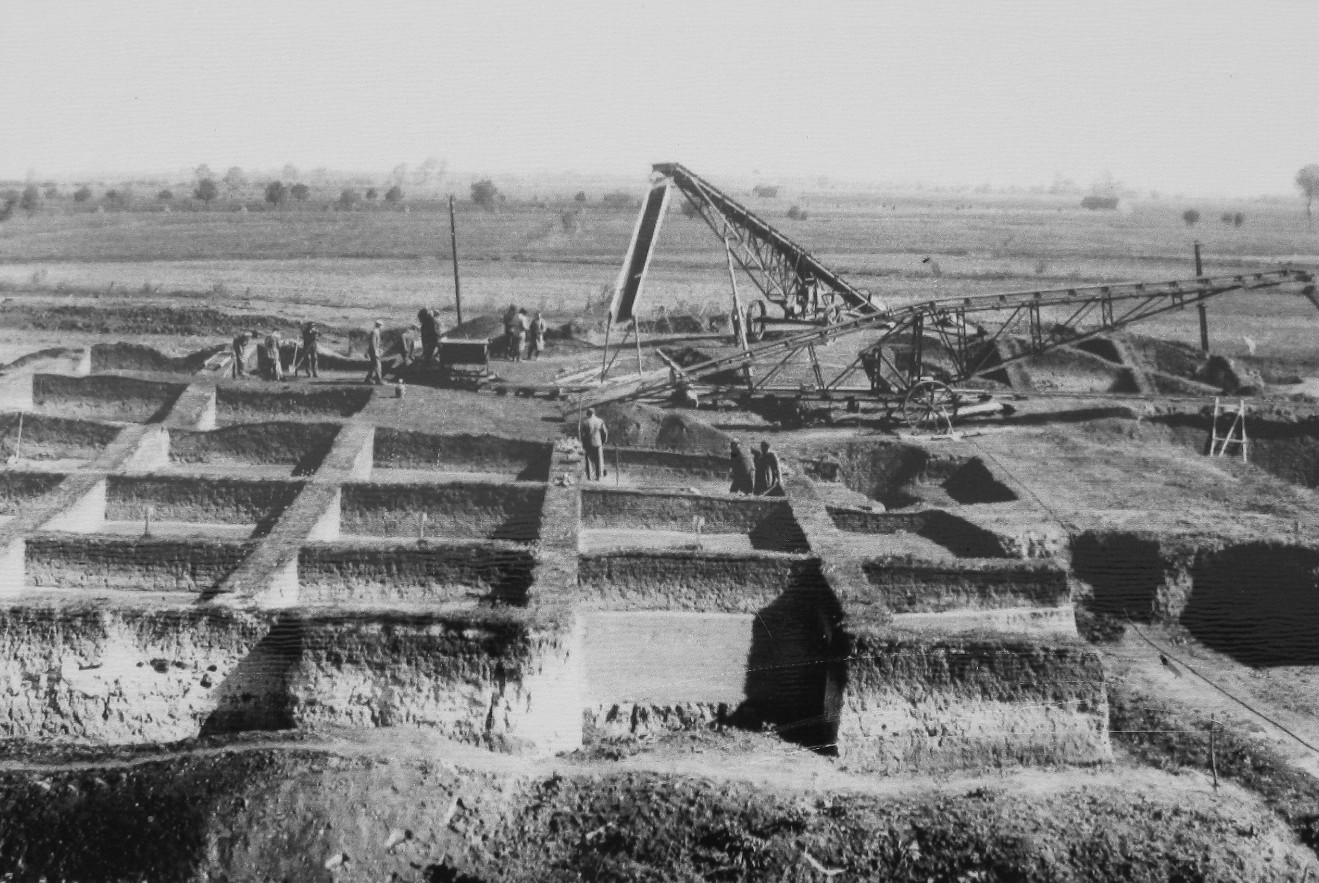
Excavations at Zámeček

A significant quantity of archaeological material has been found at the tell of Zámeček (the name means "small castle", "château"), settlement layers of which have been estimated to date from about 4,800 BC onwards. For this reason this place has become known as the "Slovakian Troy". The oldest settlement was established by the Lengyel culture in the early 5th millennium BC. A settlement of the Baden culture was later built in the same location, c. 3000 BC. The most significant period of occupation was during the Bronze Age, c. 1600 BC, when a large fortified settlement was built by the Mad'arovce culture.

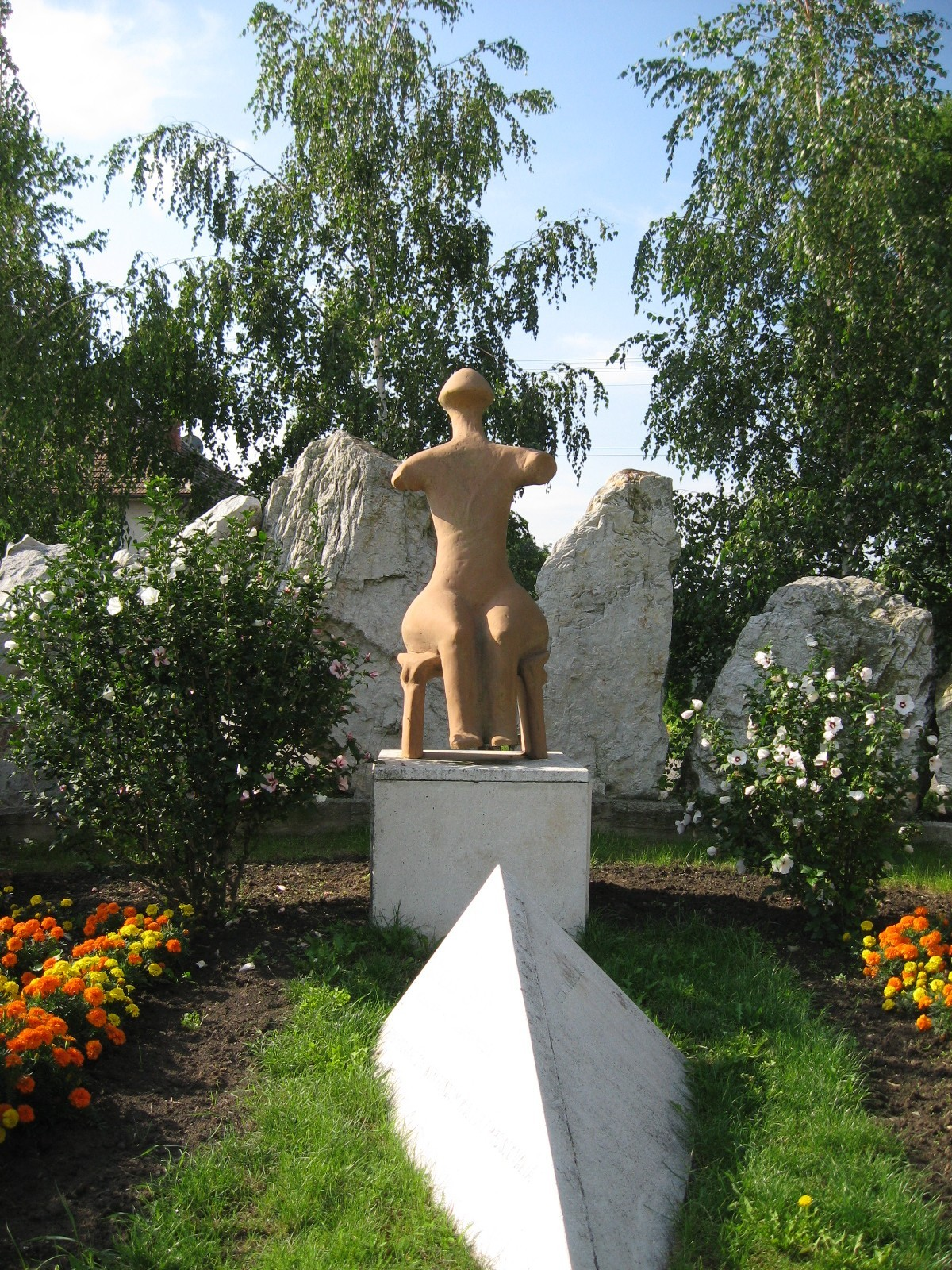
The sculpture of Venus of Hradok

A famous find was a Neolithic (Lengyel culture) figurine of a sitting woman, which was dubbed Hrádocká Venuša, or the Venus of Hradok. "Venus" is an umbrella term used in archaeology for objects of this type. The figurine was depicted on Slovakia's two-koruna coin. In 1997 a statue by Jaroslav Gubric was erected at Hradok, an enlarged copy of the figurine.

== Water ==
- Lake Mederčina
- Gravel deposit Nitriansky Hrádok
- river: Nitra and Malá Nitra (Stará Nitra)

== Streets ==
- Dolná, Hlavná, Jabloňová, Na brehu, Na lúkach, Na pažiti, Nad hliníkom, Pod hájom, Pod lipami, Pri Čiernej vode, Pri Zámočku, Prídavky, Riečna, Rovná, Topoľová, Ulička, Za kostolom, Záhradná

== Statue ==
- Statue of Magna Mater (Venus of Hradok)
- Statue of St. Florian
- Statue of St. Urban

== Touristic attraction ==
- Lake Mederčina
- Zámeček - Slovak Troy
- Venus of Hradok
- Church of St. Martina
