= Moravany nad Váhom =

- Municipality
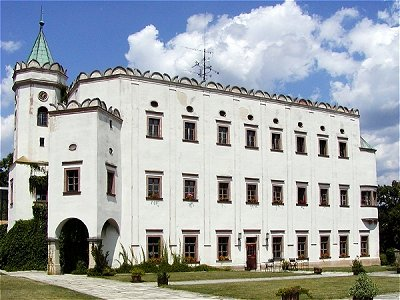

- Flag

- Location of Moravany nad Váhom in the Trnava Region Location of Moravany nad Váhom in Slovakia
- Coordinates: 48.60°N 17.86°E
- Country: Slovakia
- Region: Trnava Region
- District: Piešťany District
- First mentioned: 1348

Area
  - Total: 10.78 km^{2} (4.16 sq mi)
- Elevation: 174 m (571 ft)

Population (2025)
  - Total: 2,503
- Time zone: UTC+1 (CET)
  - Summer (DST): UTC+2 (CEST)
- Postal code: 922 21
- Area code: +421 33
- Vehicle registration plate (until 2022): PN
- Website: www.moravany.sk

Moravany nad Váhom (Hungarian: Moraván) is a village and municipality in Piešťany District in the Trnava Region of western Slovakia.

== History ==
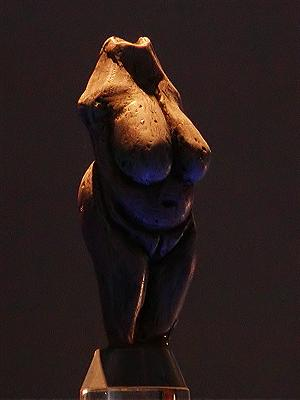
Venus of Moravany

In historical records the village was first mentioned in 1348.

A small female figurine called the Venus of Moravany was found near the village.

== Geography ==
The municipality lies at an altitude of 174 metres (571 ft) and covers an area of 10.78 km^{2} (4.16 sq mi) (2025).

== Population ==
Population statistic (10 years)
Year	1995	2005	2015	2025
Count	1816	2080	2359	2503
Difference		+14.53%	+13.41%	+6.10%

Population statistic
Year	2024	2025
Count	2505	2503
Difference		−0.07%

It has a population of 2503 people (31 December 2025).

=== Ethnicity ===
Census 2021 (1+ %)
Ethnicity	Number	Fraction
Slovak	2352	96.39%
Not found out	65	2.66%
Czech	27	1.1%
Total	2440	

In year 2021 was 2440 people by ethnicity 2352 as Slovak, 65 as Not found out, 27 as Czech, 16 as Other, 9 as German, 7 as Russian, 4 as Italian, 3 as Turkish, 3 as Romani, 3 as Austrian, 3 as Hungarian, 1 as Ukrainian, 1 as Silesian, 1 as Rusyn, 1 as Croatian and 1 as Bulgarian.

Note on population: The difference values of population numbers in the table "Population statistic" and in the sections "Ethnicity" & "Religion" is caused by the use of various statistical methods.

=== Religion ===
Census 2021 (1+ %)
Religion	Number	Fraction
Roman Catholic Church	1634	66.97%
None	605	24.8%
Evangelical Church	72	2.95%
Not found out	42	1.72%
Total	2440	

In year 2021 was 2440 people by religion 1634 from Roman Catholic Church, 605 from None, 72 from Evangelical Church, 42 from Not found out, 17 from Other, 12 from Greek Catholic Church, 11 from Ad hoc movements, 10 from Jehovah's Witnesses, 8 from Christian Congregations in Slovakia, 8 from Buddhism, 5 from Other and not ascertained christian church, 4 from Czechoslovak Hussite Church, 3 from Paganism and natural spirituality, 3 from Islam, 2 from Old Catholic Church, 2 from United Methodist Church, 1 from Eastern Orthodox Church and 1 from Apostolic Church.
