= Endre =

Endre is a Hungarian and Scandinavian masculine given name, which is the official form of the English "Andrew" rather than András.

András is the Hungarian form of Andreas. Although, the two names has common origins to the Geek name of Andreas, the variant Andrew is actually comes from the Old French name of Andrieu, which developed into the Anglo-Norman name of Andreu and finally into modern English as Andrew. The second variant developed during the Norman Conquest of England.

In English, 'w' is a long 'u' sound such as 'ú' in Hungarian. The significance of this, is that the modern English pronunciation Andrew, apart from the first letter, is fairly close to the Anglo-Norman variant of Andreu.

Notable people with the name include:

== Hungary ==
- Endre (vice-palatine), 13th-century nobleman
- Endre Ady, poet
- Endre Botka, footballer
- Endre Elekes, Olympic wrestler
- Endre Gerelyes, novelist, short story writer, literature professor
- Endre Hadik-Barkóczy, politician
- Endre Kabos, three-time Olympic champion sabre fencer
- Endre Major, para table tennis player
- Endre Németi, 13th-century nobleman
- Endre Steiner, chess player
- Endre Szemerédi, mathematician

== Norway ==
- Endre Fotland Knudsen, Norwegian football midfielder
- Endre Nordli, Norwegian handball player
