= Hatvan culture =

Hungarian Bronze Age archaeological culture

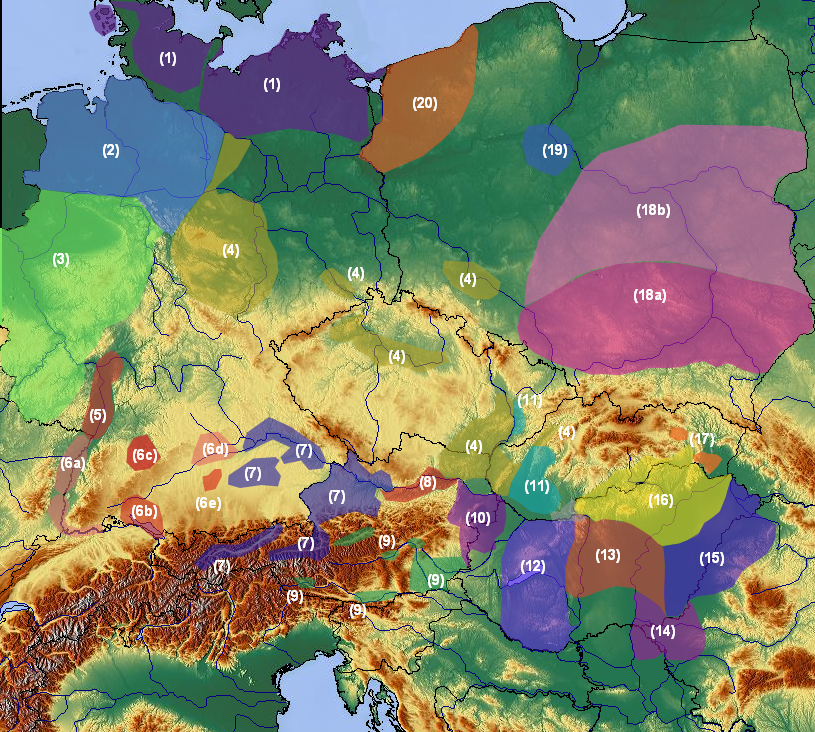
- Geographical range: Hungary, Slovakia
- Period: Bronze Age
- Dates: 20th-18th centuries BC
- Type site: Nagyrév
- Preceded by: Nagyrév culture
- Followed by: Ottomány culture, Mad'arovce culture

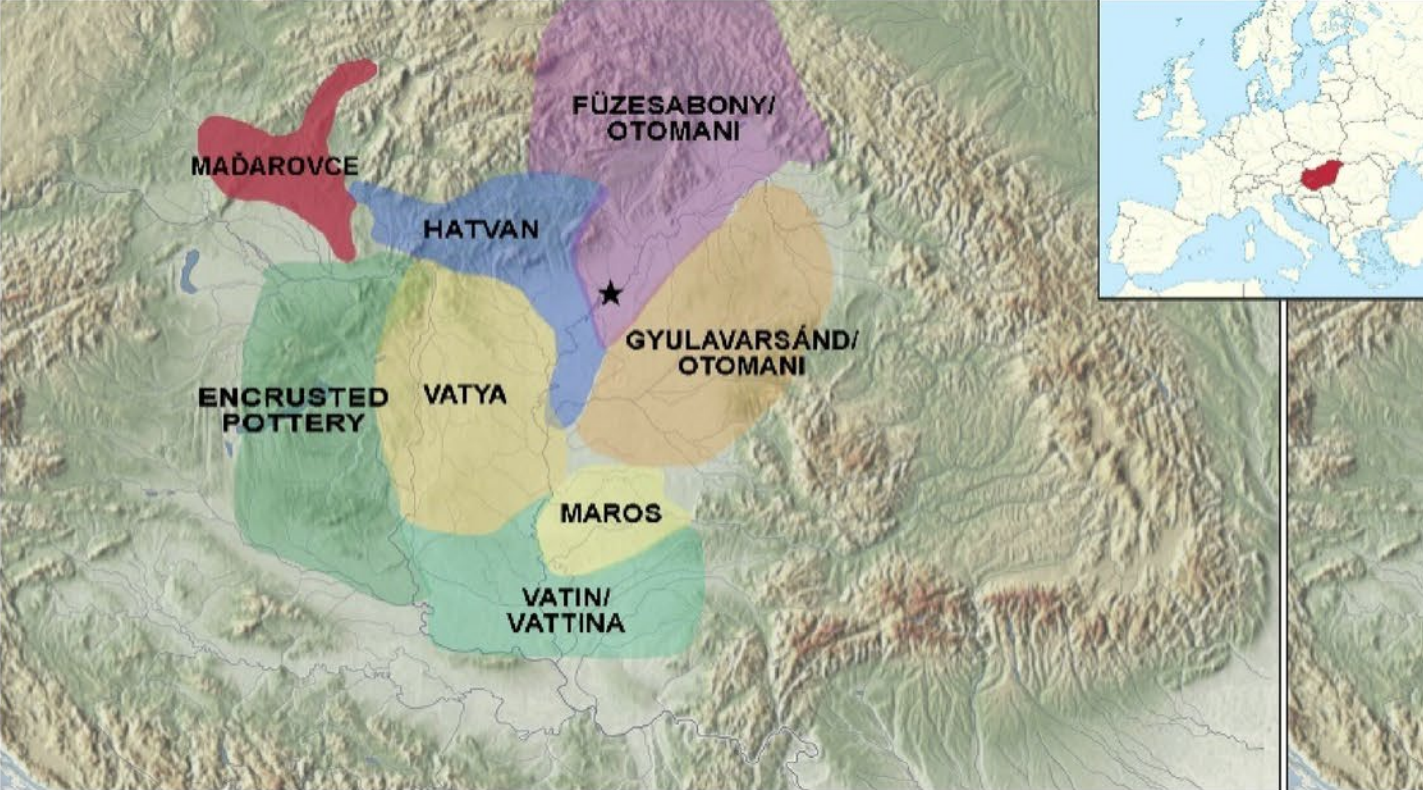
Geographic distribution of Middle Bronze Age cultures in the Carpathian Basin: Ottomány culture, Maros culture, Vatya culture, Vatin culture, Mad'arovce culture, Encrusted Pottery culture

The Hatvan culture was a Hungarian Bronze Age archaeological culture that succeeded the Nagyrév culture. The earliest identified settlements are located in the Cserehát Hills, later expanding into northern Hungary and the Tisza valley, and the Tiszazug area in Eastern Hungary. The end of Hatvan culture was associated with the expansion of the Ottomány culture.

== Burials ==
Burials were carried out via cremation. Ashes were either scattered into the grave pit, or buried in a funeral urn. Vessels with food and beverages were buried along with the deceased. Burial sites were placed closer to settlements during the Hatvan period than in the previous Nagyrév period.

== Settlements ==
Over 100 Hatvan Settlements have been identified; often built between 5-10 Kilometers apart. These settlements were often fortified; containing long rectangular houses made of timber and daub. In the last century of the early Bronze Age, Hatvan settlements were carefully planned, with houses being placed around an open, centralized location. Houses were often around 12 meters in length during this early settlement stage. Fortifications consisted of ditches and ramparts. It was named after Hatvan, Hungary. It is believed that the Hatvan culture came into conflict with the Ottomány (Füzesabony) culture, based upon the site at Jászdózsa–Kápolnahalom. The settlement was purposefully burned, indicated by the presence of thick layers of burnt debris in every house uncovered at this site. Hidden under the floor of one house were over 140 grams of ornaments including; bronze axes, amber beads, and gold hair ornaments. The center of this site has a 4 meter deep sacrifice pit, which contains the remains of brown bears, aurochs, boar, deer, and pigs. Hatvan Pottery was largely textile and Barbotine ware. Their fortified inhabited settlements were mainly located in the Bükk region and the Mátra region.

== Gallery ==
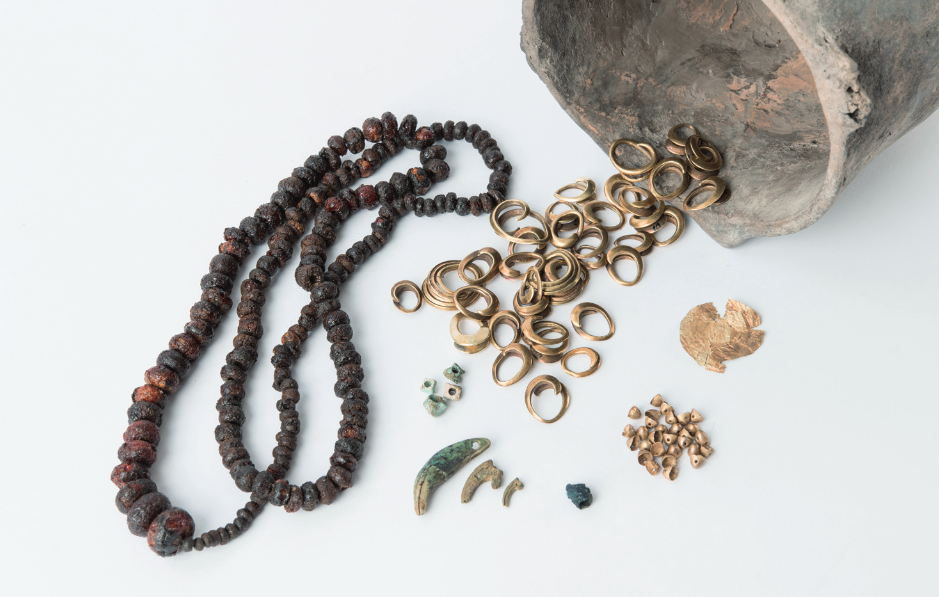
Amber and gold hoard from Jászdózsa-Kápolnahalom tell settlement, Hungary, c. 2000 BC

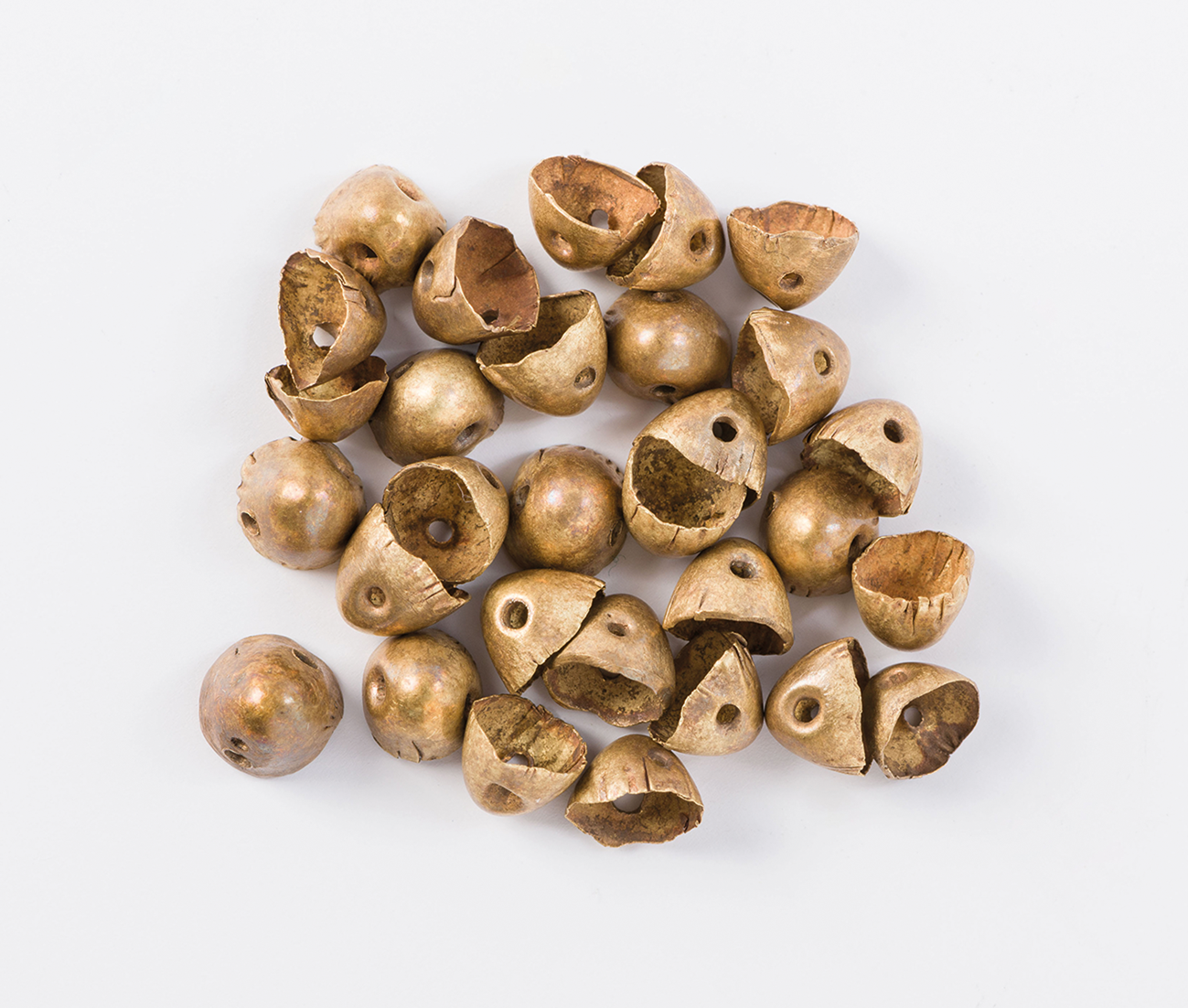
Decorative gold cones from Jászdózsa-Kápolnahalom, sewn onto clothing. c. 2000 BC

== See also ==
- Unetice culture
- Wietenberg culture
- Tei culture
- Bronze Age Britain
- Argaric culture
