= Balatoni =

Balatoni is a surname. Notable people with the surname include:

- Conrad Balatoni (born 1991), English footballer
- Éva Balatoni (born 1957), Hungarian mezzo-soprano
- Kamill Balatoni (1912–1945), Hungarian sprint canoeist
- Levente Balatoni (1910–2000), Hungarian Olympic skier
