= Judit Varga (disambiguation) =

Judit Varga (born 1980) is a Hungarian politician.

Judit Varga may also refer to:

- Judit Varga (runner) (born 1976), Hungarian-Italian middle-distance runner
- Judit Varga (composer) (born 1979), Hungarian composer and pianist
