= József Ágoston =

Hungarian lawyer and Member of Parliament

József Ágoston de Kisjóka (1800 – 9 March 1860) was a Hungarian lawyer and Member of Parliament (MP).

== His life ==
Ágoston was born in Hatvan, Hungary, the son of Ferenc Ágoston, a major judge in the counties of Borsod, Gömör, and Heves. He worked as a lawyer in Pest for nearly 40 years. His speeches on the Assembly of the County are registered in the newspaper Törvényhatósági Tudósítások edited by Lajos Kossuth. In the Parliament between 1848 and 1849 he represented the constituency of Dédes. He died in Pest.

== His works ==
1. Felelet maithsteini nemes Wildner Ignácznak bizonyos magyar váltó jogi kérdés feletti őszinte véleményére. Pest, 1844.
2. Vasútügy cikke megjelent a Pesti Naplóban 1854. 248. sz.

== Sources ==
- Szinnyei, József (2000), Magyar írók élete és munkái [Life and Works of Hungarian Writers] (in Hungarian), Budapest: Arcanum, ISBN 978-9638602992
