= Vatya culture =

Bronze Age culture in modern-day Hungary

- Geographical range: Carpathian Basin, Hungary
- Period: Middle Bronze Age
- Dates: ca. 2000 BC-1400 BC
- Preceded by: Nagyrév culture, Vučedol culture
- Followed by: Urnfield culture, Gáva culture

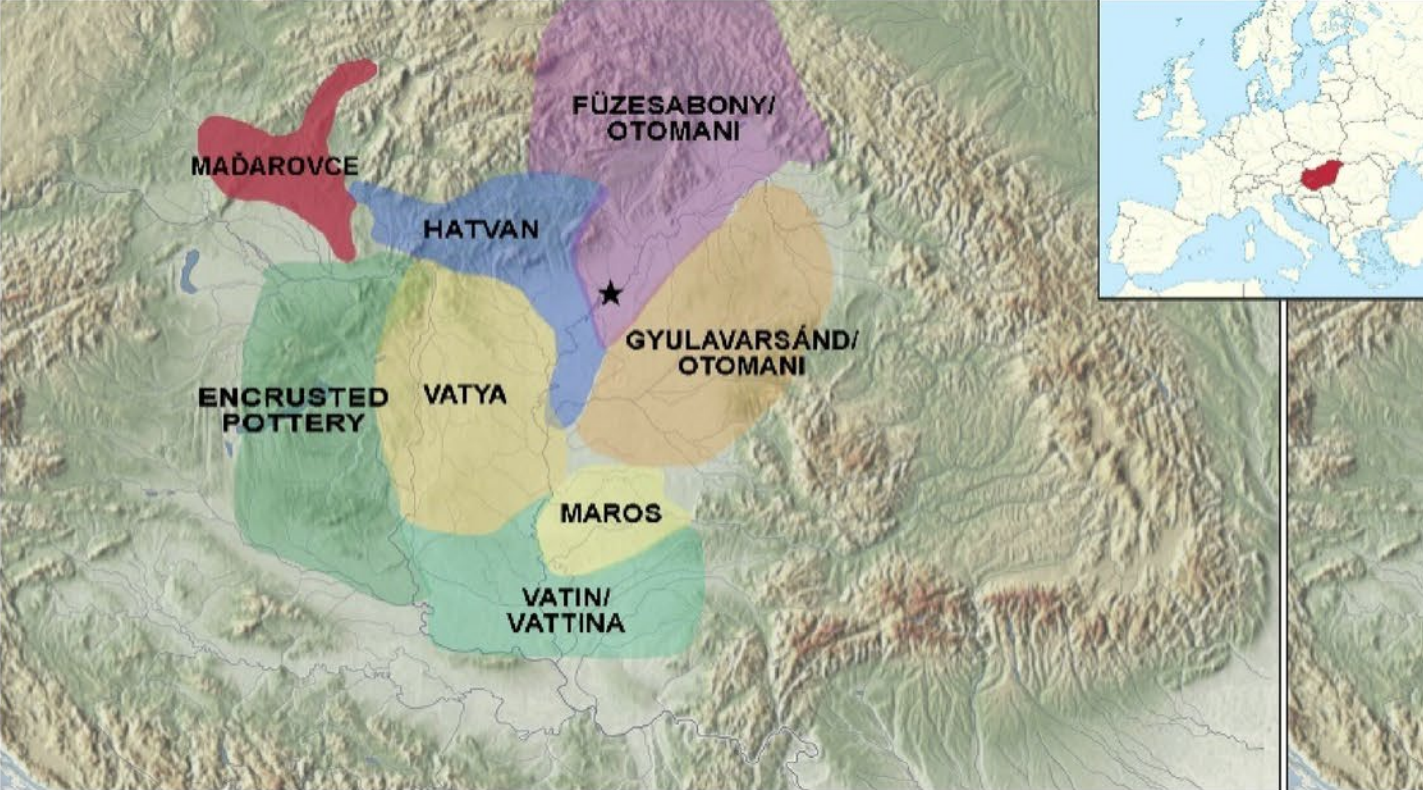
Geographic distribution of Middle Bronze Age cultures in the Carpathian Basin: Ottomány culture, Maros culture, Hatvan culture, Vatin culture, Mad'arovce culture, Encrusted Pottery culture

The Vatya culture was an archaeological culture of the Early to Middle Bronze Age (ca. 2000-1400 BC), located in the central Danube basin in Hungary. The culture developed from the Nagyrév culture with influences from the Kisapostag culture. It is primarily known for its fortified settlements, cremation burial sites, and bronze production. The Vatya culture was eventually succeeded by the Urnfield culture.

Százhalombatta-Földvár, situated along the Danube River in Hungary, was a significant fortified settlement of the Vatya culture, with occupation layers reaching up to 6 meters deep.

== Genetic profile ==
Genetic analysis of six individuals from the Százhalombatta-Földvár and Erd sites revealed Y-DNA haplogroup I in one individual, with two others belonging to the derived clades I2a2a1 and I2a2a1a2a. Mitochondrial DNA was varied: H2a1, J1c9, H11a, T1a1, T2b, and U5a2a.

== Gallery ==
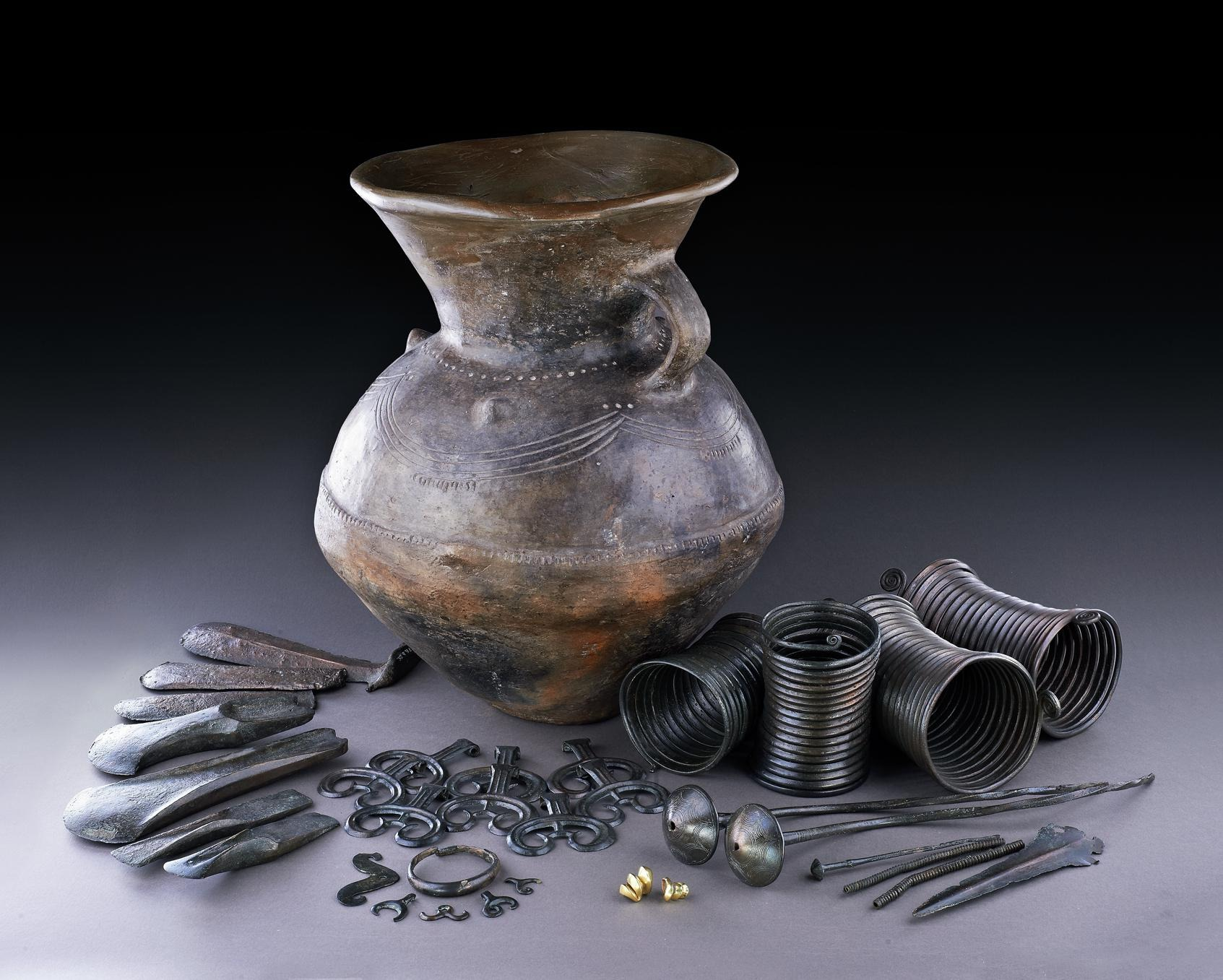
Objects from the Százhalombatta-Földvár 'Hoard II', 1700-1500 BC

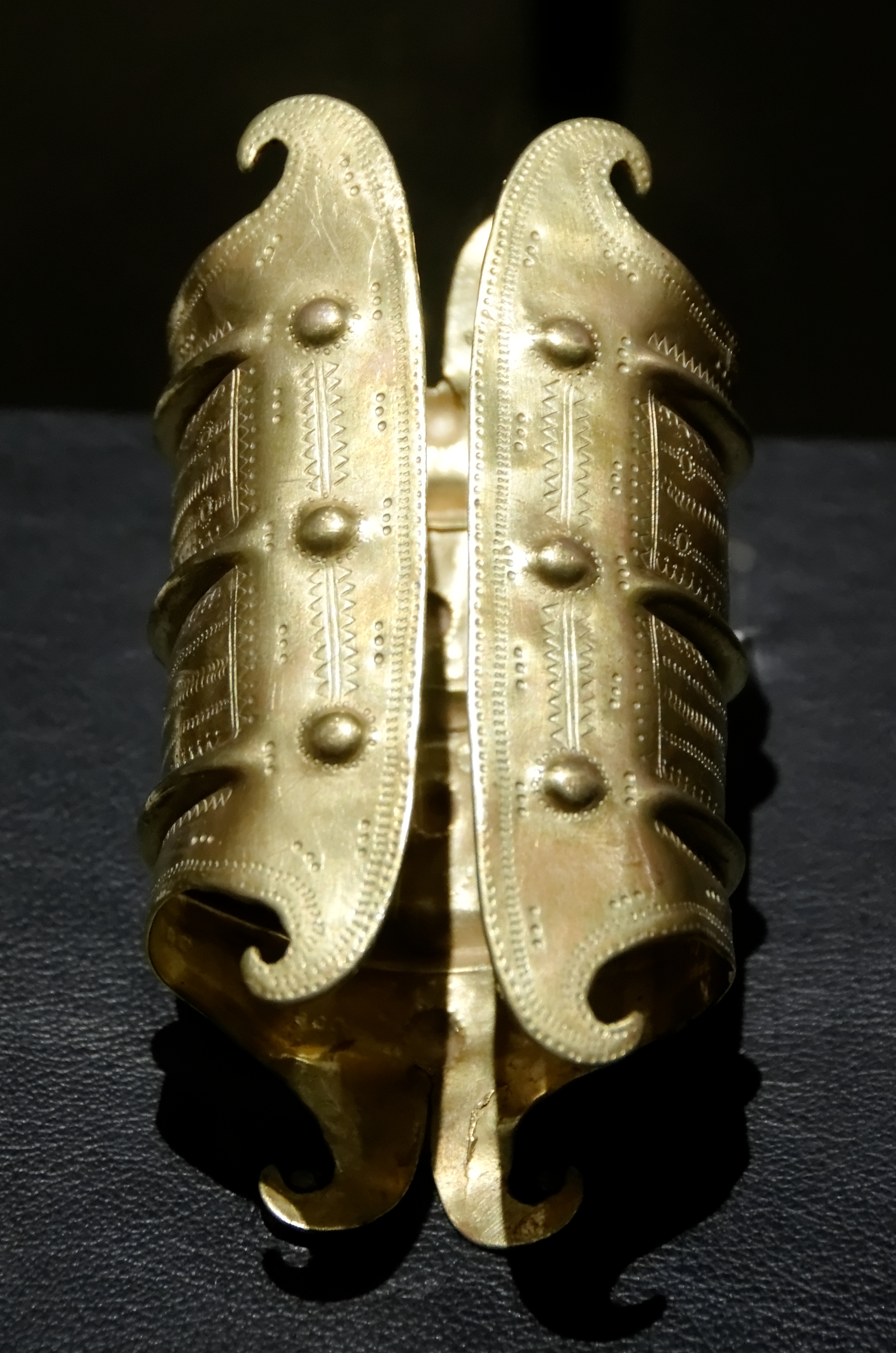
Gold bracelet from Dunavecse, Hungary, c. 1500 BC.

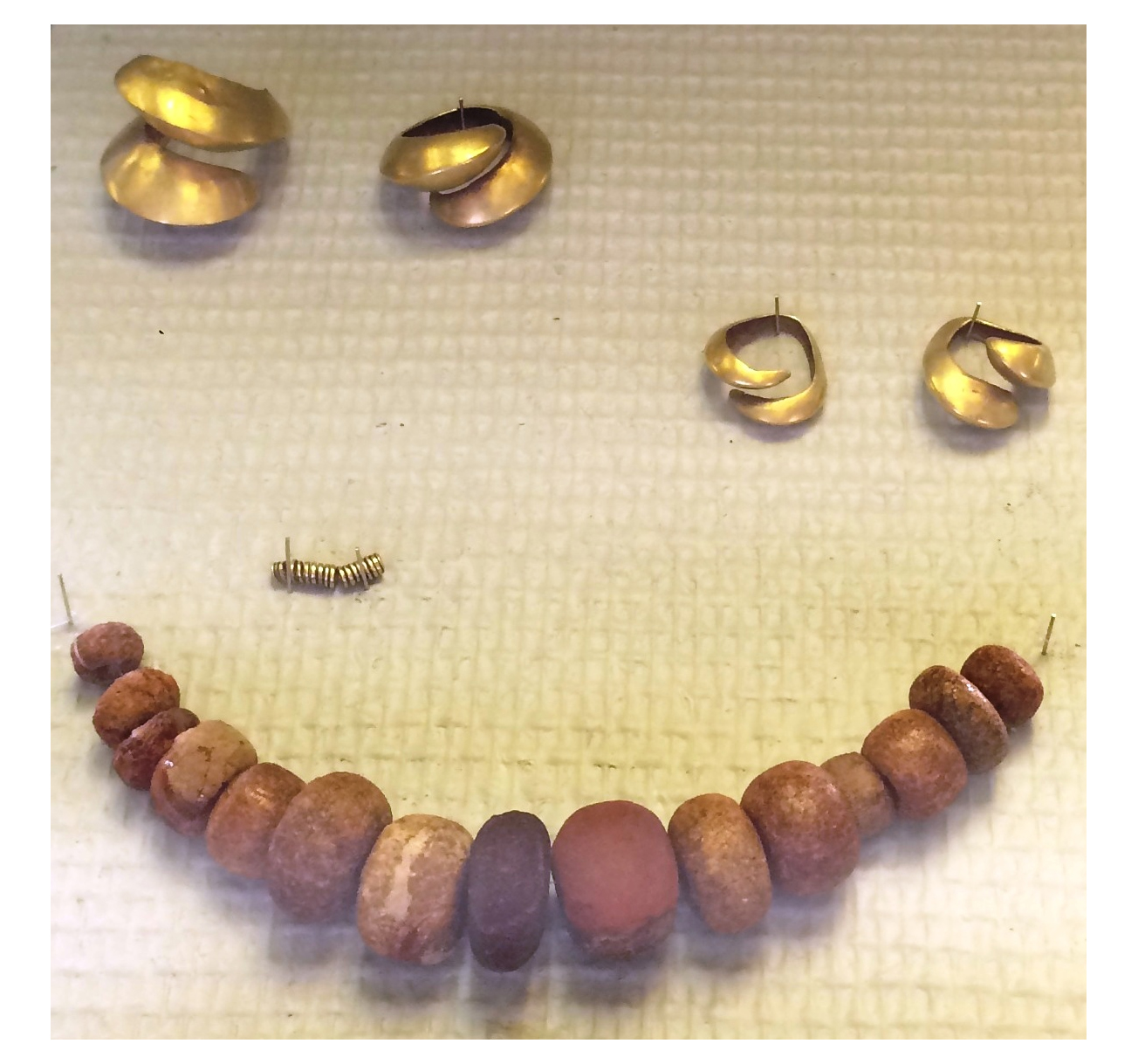
Gold rings and amber necklace

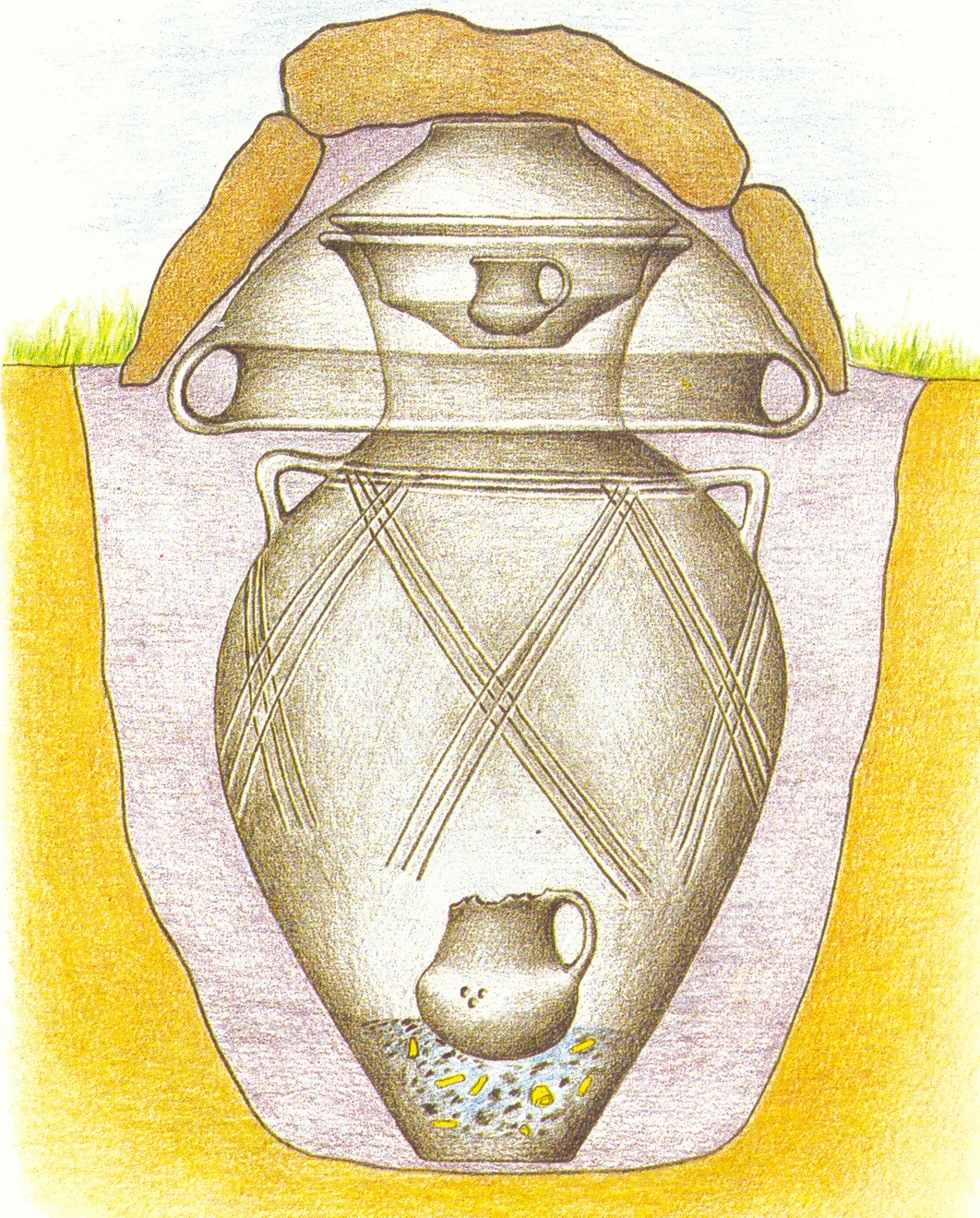
Vatya culture cremation urn burial

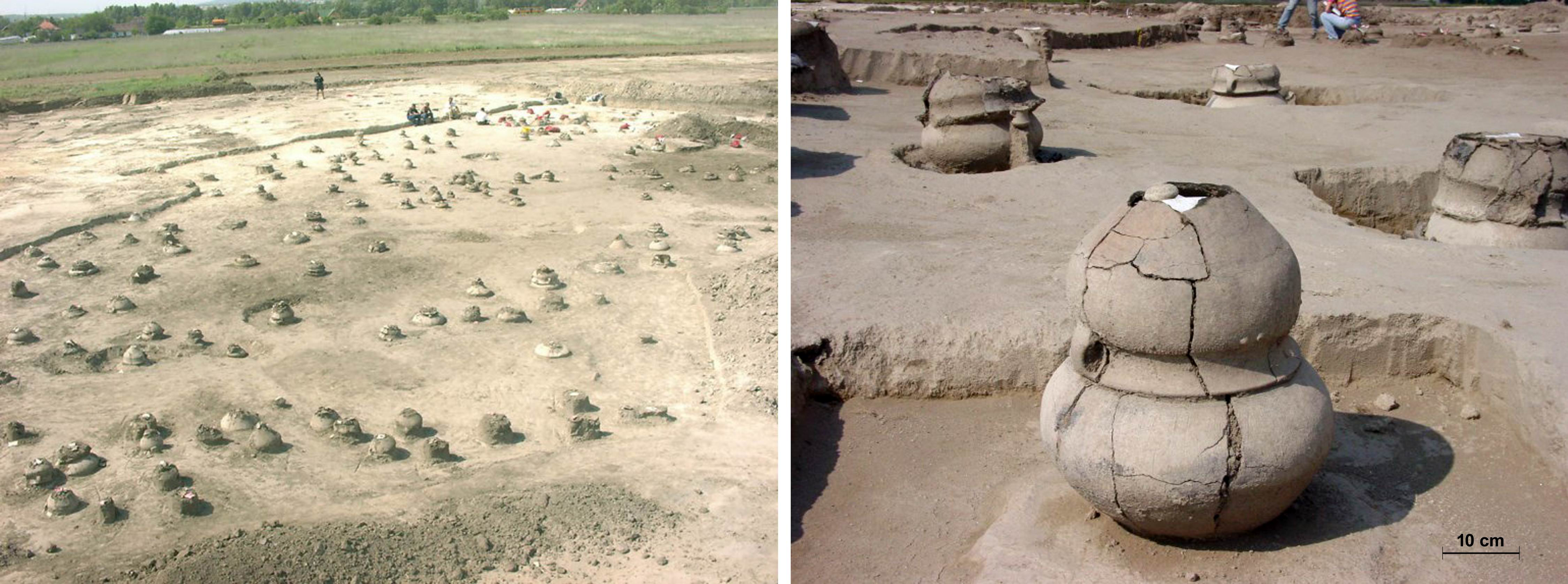
Vatya culture 'urnfield' burials

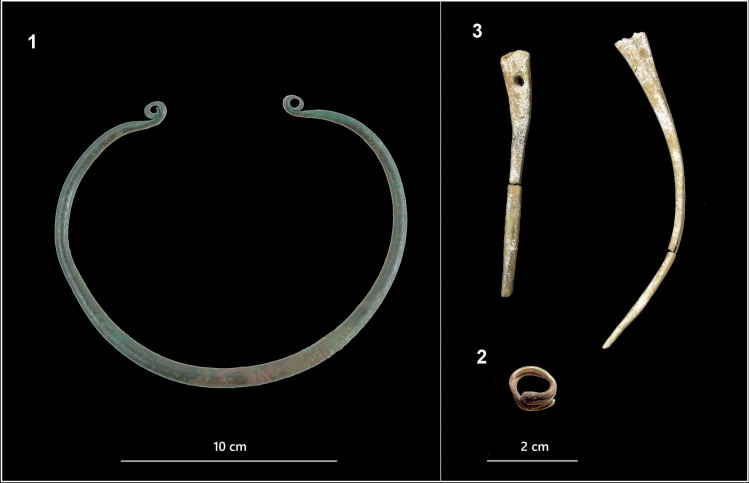
Bronze neck-ring, gold hair ring and bone pins

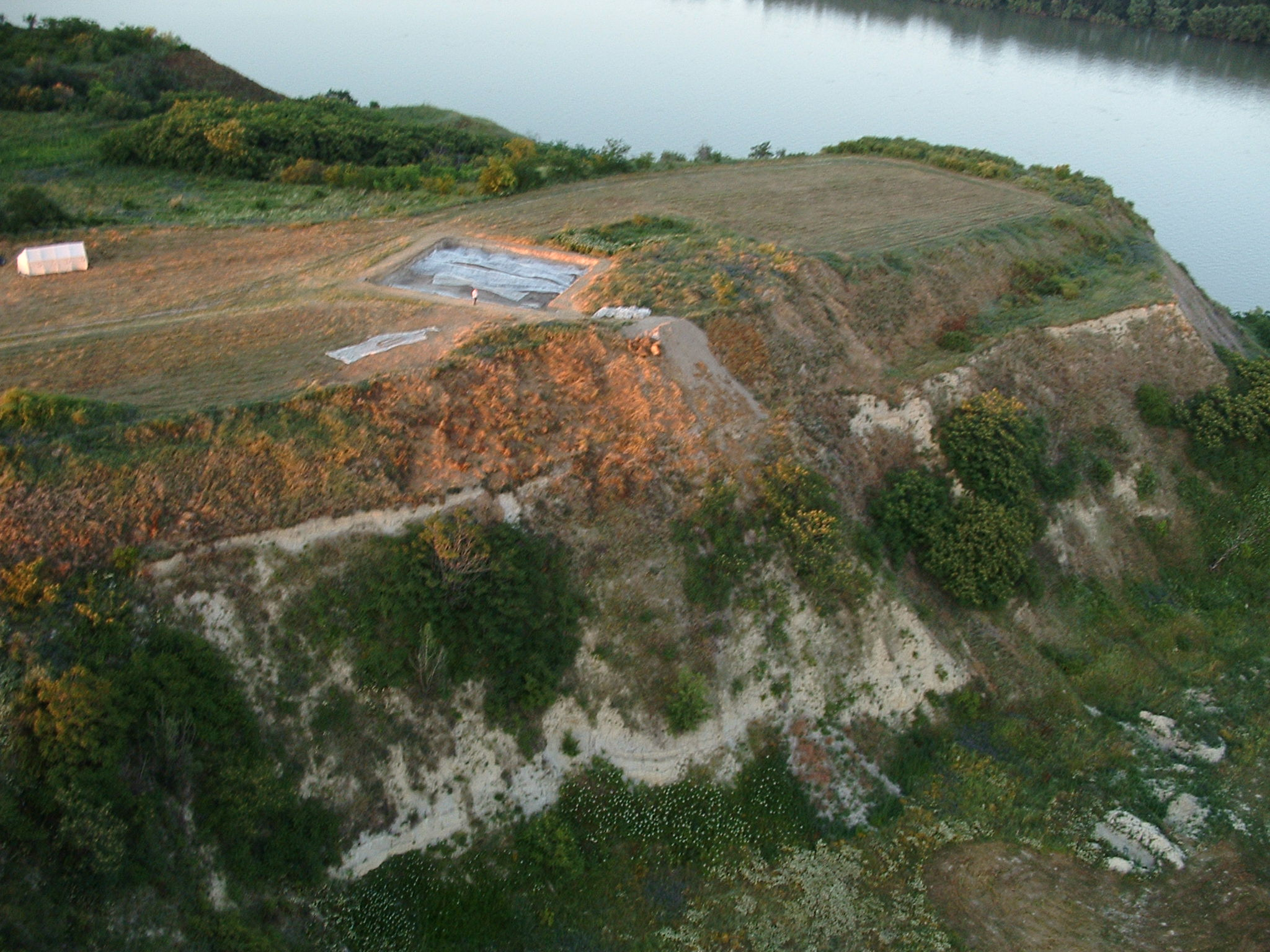
Százhalombatta-Földvár fortified settlement site, Hungary

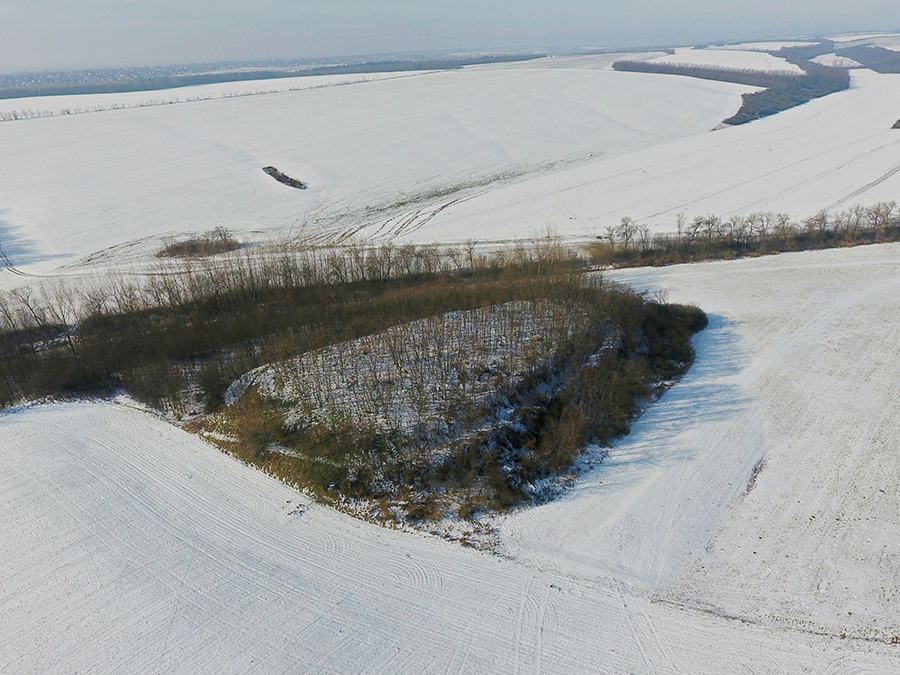
Fortified settlement at Leányvár, Hungary

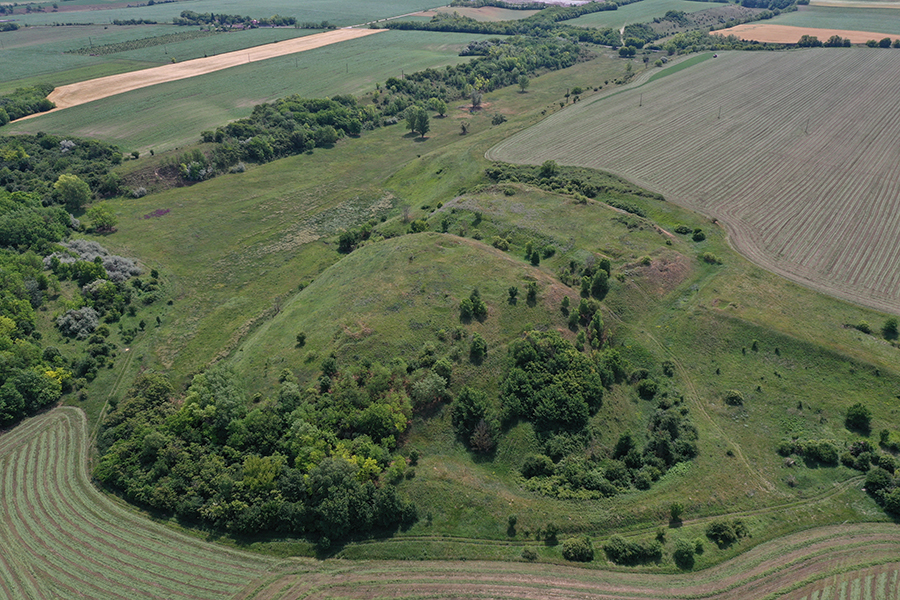
Sárbogárd hillfort, Hungary

== See also ==
- Maros culture
- Ottomány culture
- Wietenberg culture
- Tei culture
- Vatin culture
- Hatvan culture
- Encrusted Pottery culture
- Mad'arovce culture
- Monteoru culture
- Unetice culture
- Tumulus culture
- Nordic Bronze Age
- Srubnaya culture
