= Százhalombatta-Földvár =

Temperate tell settlement during the Bronze Age

Coordinates: 47.339573°N 18.946166°E

The Bronze Age site of Százhalombatta-Földvár is situated on the right bank of the Danube, near the town of Százhalombatta, 30 km south of Budapest in Hungary. It is one of the largest temperate tell settlements from this period in central Europe. Excavation at the site is ongoing and producing substantial new data revealing a detailed and hitherto unknown picture of Bronze Age life from 2000-1400 BC.

== The Site ==
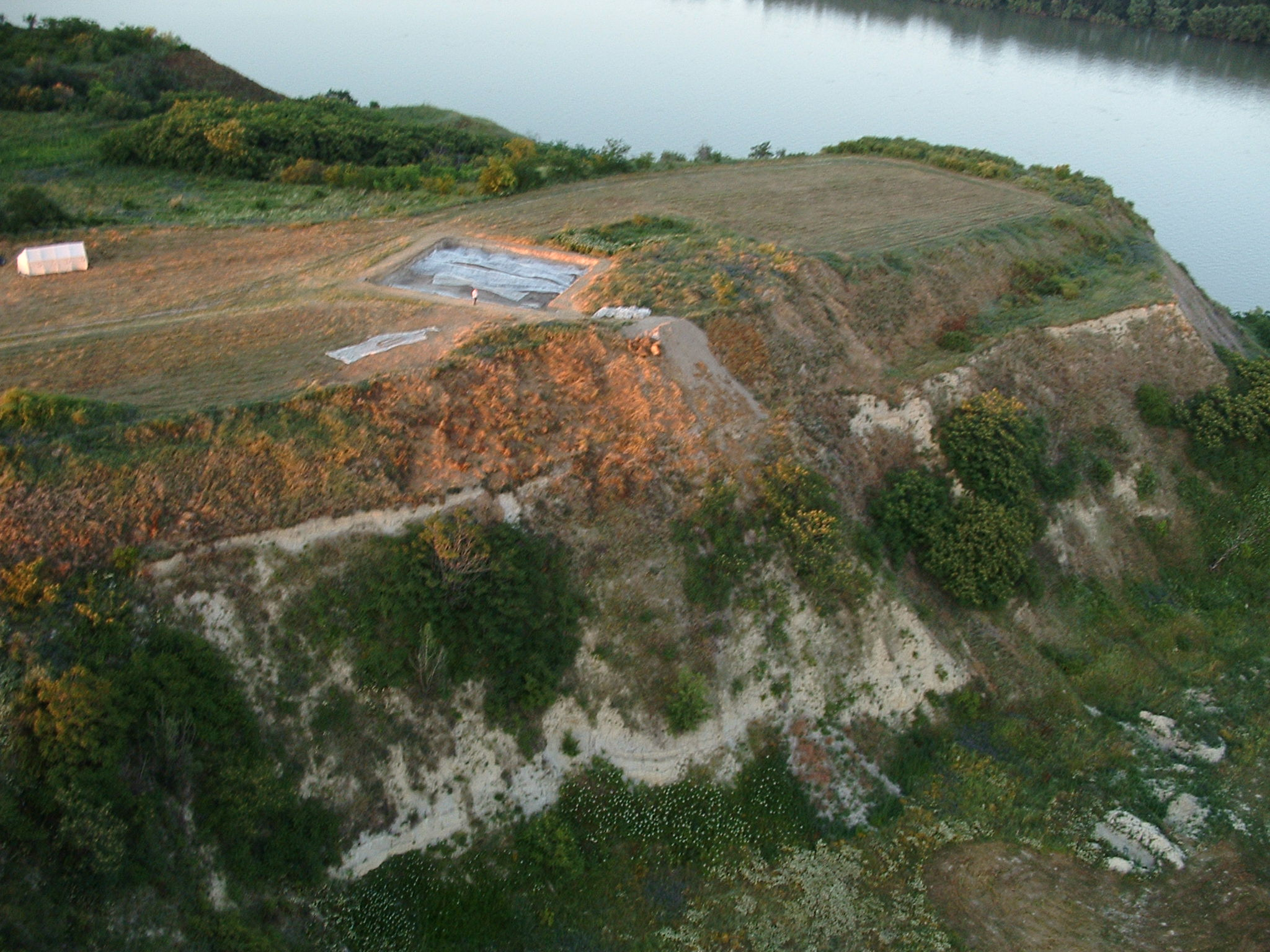
An aerial photo of the site

The site of Százhalombatta is 200 m by 100 m in area. It is estimated that up to two thirds of the original area was destroyed during clay extraction by a local brick factory and by erosion from the River Danube. The Bronze Age settlement was built on a bluff with valleys to north and south, the River Danube to the east and it was fortified with a ditch to the west, a feature common to other Vatya culture tells. It was strategically positioned at the end of the Benta valley, potentially controlling access to other sites including smaller settlements within the valley. It overlooks a long stretch of the River Danube and may have been involved in river-borne trade and communication. The settlement was first occupied at the end of the Early Bronze Age (the transition from the classic Nagyrév culture (Szigetszentmiklós) to the late Nagyrév (Kulcs). It was continuously inhabited through the Middle Bronze Age Vatya period. This was followed by a hiatus in occupation until the Urnfield phase of the Late Bronze Age from which there are only a few traces. Occupation layers at the site are up to 6 m deep.

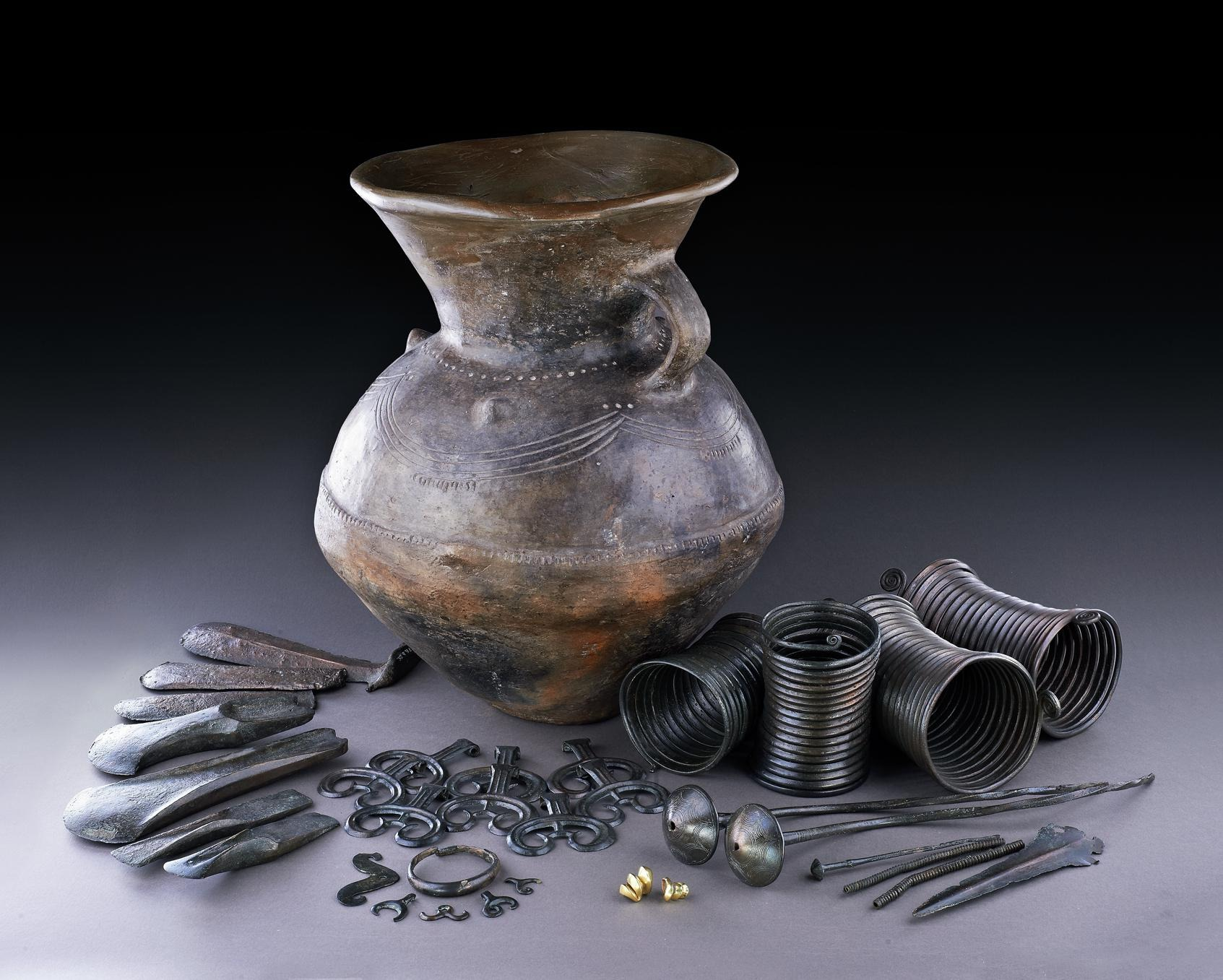
Objects from the Százhalombatta-Földvár 'Hoard II', Vatya culture, 1700-1500 BC

Finds from the site include pottery, daub, plaster, metalwork, moulds, loom weights, bone tools, antler objects, ground stone, lithics, amber, animal and occasional human bones. Many of the Bronze Age houses were burnt. This has resulted in outstanding preservation of organic material including botanical remains such as thatch from house roofs and Bronze Age food like crabapples, peas, beans and lentils. There is also worked wood and basketry. Thin section soil micromorphology, phytoliths, charcoal and coprolites add to the data from the site.

== Excavation team ==
Excavation at the site is directed by Dr Magdolna Vicze (Matrica Museum), Professor Marie Louise Stig Sørensen (University of Cambridge), and Prof Joanna Sofaer (University of Southampton). The annual excavations include Hungarian and British students from Eötvös Loránd University in Budapest, the University of Pécs, the University of Southampton and the University of Cambridge, as well as Dutch students, notably from Leiden University, and Swedish students.
