= Mad'arovce culture =

Bronze Age culture in Slovakia

- Geographical range: Slovakia
- Period: Early Bronze Age
- Dates: c. 1750 BC–1500 BC
- Preceded by: Únětice culture, Hatvan culture
- Followed by: Tumulus culture

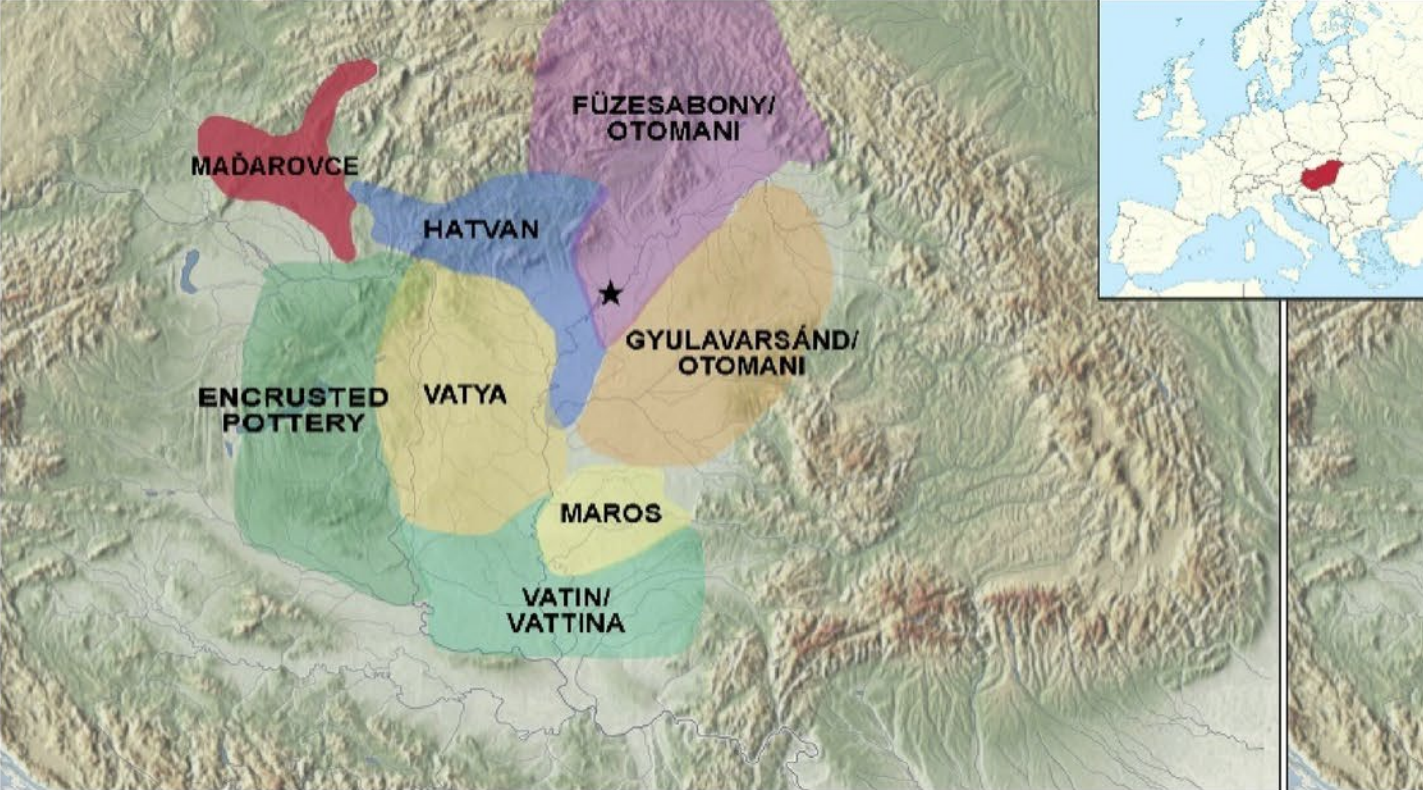
Geographic distribution of Middle Bronze Age cultures in the Carpathian Basin: Ottomány culture, Maros culture, Hatvan culture, Vatya culture, Vatin culture, Encrusted Pottery culture

The Mad'arovce culture was an archaeological culture of the Early Bronze Age (c. 1750–1500 BC) located in western Slovakia. It formed part of the broader Mad'arovce-Věteřov-Böheimkirchen cultural complex, also found in Austria and Moravia, which had links with Mycenaean Greece. There was a gradual evolution from the preceding Únětice and Hatvan cultures to the Mad'arovce culture from c. 2000 BC to 1750 BC, and it was succeeded by the Tumulus culture after 1500 BC. The Mad'arovce culture is sometimes considered to be a sub-group in the final Únětice tradition. Important sites include the fortified settlements of Fidvár and Nitriansky Hrádok which are described as belonging to a 'Únětice-Maďarovce' archaeological horizon.

== Gallery ==
Reconstruction of the Bronze Age settlement of Nitriansky Hrádok. (The empty part of the settlement is unexcavated)

== See also ==
- Únětice culture
- Bronze Age Britain
- Rhône culture
- Armorican Tumulus culture
- Polada culture
- Ottomány culture
- Vatya culture
- Vatin culture
- Encrusted Pottery culture
- Hatvan culture
- Tei culture
- Monteoru culture
- Unterwölbling culture
- Wietenberg culture
- Nordic Bronze Age
