= Százhalombatta =

Town in Pest, Hungary

- Town
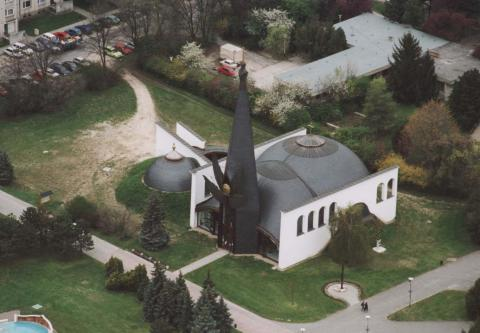
- Church of Saint Stephen by Imre Makovecz

- Flag Coat of arms

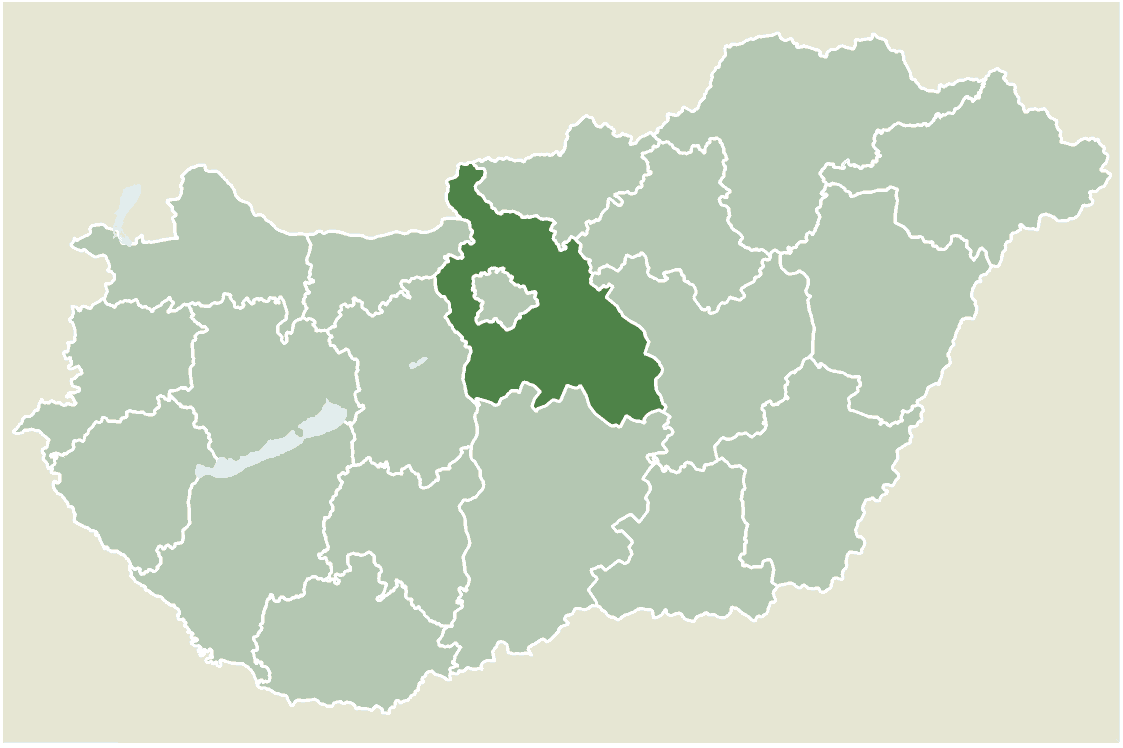
- Location of Pest county in Hungary

- Location of Százhalombatta
- Coordinates: 47.30042°N 18.91362°E
- Country: Hungary
- County: Pest

Area
  - Total: 28.06 km^{2} (10.83 sq mi)

Population (2024)
  - Total: 17,971
  - Density: 662.83/km^{2} (1,716.7/sq mi)
- Demonym: százhalombattai
- Time zone: UTC+1 (CET)
  - Summer (DST): UTC+2 (CEST)
- Postal code: 2440
- Area code: 23
- Website: https://www.szazhalombatta.hu/

Százhalombatta (Hungarian: [ˈsaːshɒlombɒttɒ]; German: Hundertholmbatten; Croatian: Bata; Serbian: Бата, romanized: Bata) is a town in Pest County, Hungary. The name of this town in Hungarian literally means "One hundred tumuli" referring to the tumulus field at the edge of the town.

== History ==
Groups of people had already settled in this area four thousand years ago in the Neolithic Age.

On the plateau stretching over the River Danube in the Old Town, the Bronze Age population built an earthwork, the defence of which was ensured by the river in the northeast, the deep valley in the south and by a rampart in the west. The interior of the earthwork was inhabited for almost six hundred years. The layers of the settlements deposited on one another now amount to a depth of up to six meters. This tell settlement is now called Százhalombatta-Földvár. Excavation and management of the site is by the Matrica Museum as part of an international project on Bronze Age Europe.

In the 7th-6th centuries BC it was the eastern branch of the Hallstatt culture that appeared in the region. Significant people from the culture's population are buried in the tumulus graveyard. The six-hectare territory presently functions as an archeological park, also part of the Matrica Museum. It is in this prehistoric open-air museum that a 2,700-year-old tumulus was excavated, reconstructed and inaugurated in April 1998 by the President of Hungary. In the tumulus, the remains of a crypt can be viewed accompanied by a multimedia presentation of the funeral rite and beliefs of the era.

== Transport ==
Százhalombatta is served by one main railway station. Regular services run to and from the station into the centre of Budapest and the East of Hungary. There are also regular bus services to and from the capital taking approximately 45 minutes to reach the centre. Given the town's location on the Danube, boat services also link the town to the capital.

== Local facilities ==
The town has its own sports centre boasting 6 outdoor clay tennis courts, 4 hardcourts, a full 400 metre track and field facility, indoor basketball/handball court, gym and football pitch. Located next to the sports centre is the "Százhalombatta Strand" which is popular attraction to both locals and visitors in the summer months. The Strand hosts one olympic sized swimming pool, two children's pool, one large leisure pool with water fountains and slides and a warm heated Jacuzzi therapeutic pool. Százhalombatta has a bustling social life, with an array of shops, supermarkets, bars and clubs spread throughout the town. The centrepiece of the city is large church designed by prominent architect Imre Makovecz.

== Twin towns – sister cities ==
Százhalombatta is twinned with:

- Brzesko, Poland
- Sannazzaro de' Burgondi, Italy
- Altötting, Germany
- Sovata, Romania
