= Éva Balatoni =

Hungarian opera singer

- Born: 20 June 1957 (age 69); Hatvan, Hungary
- Occupations: Singer, Music Teacher
- Years active: 1986-Present
- Known for: Hungarian National Opera

Éva Balatoni (born 20 June 1957 in Hatvan) is a Hungarian mezzo-soprano and music teacher. She first studied the piano then started to sing when she was 14. After matriculating from secondary school in Miskolc, she earned a teaching diploma from the Zak Teacher Training College in Debrecen in 1978, after which she taught music for a number of years. Her career as a singer began in 1986 at the Csokonai Theatre in Debrecen where she performed the role of Judith in Bartók's opera Bluebeard's Castle. In 1991 she joined the ensemble of the Hungarian Opera House. Notable roles include Amneris in Verdi's Aida, Eboli in Verdi's Don Carlos, Sinaide in Rossini's Mosè in Egitto, and Örzse in Kodály's Háry János. Since 2013 with the Hungarian National Opera she has appeared in La traviata, Mefistofele, Jenůfa, Der fliegende Holländer, Elektra, Blood Wedding, The Barber of Seville, The Marriage of Figaro and Andrea Chénier. In 2016, in commemoration of the 60th anniversary of the Hungarian Revolution of 1956, her performance as the mother-in-law in Judit Varga's opera Love (Szerelem) was well-received.
