= Nagyrév culture =

Bronze Age culture in present-day Hungary

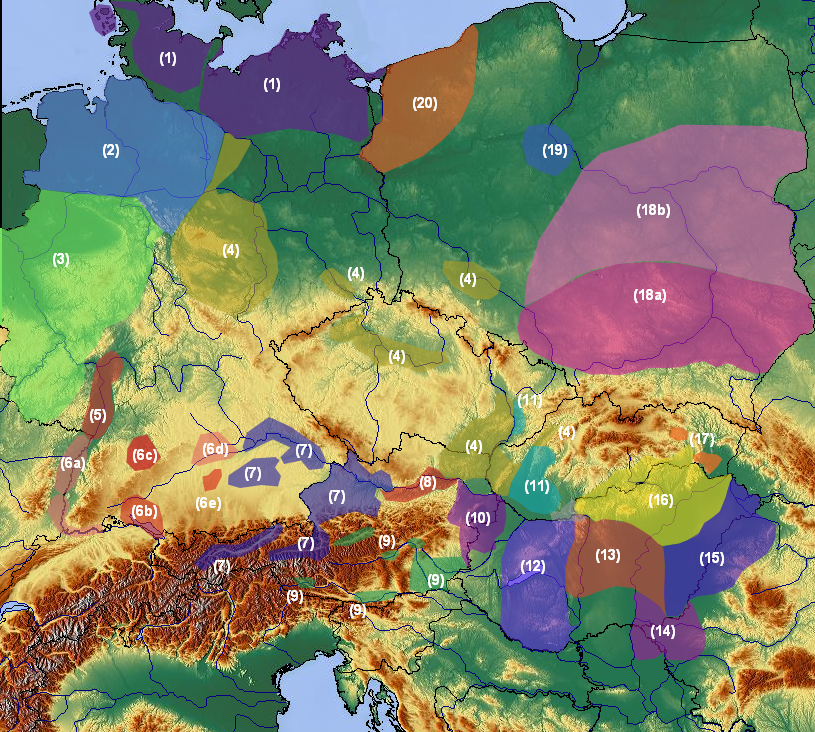
- #13 - Nagyrév culture
- Geographical range: Hungary and Slovakia
- Period: Bronze Age
- Dates: 3rd millennium BC – 2nd millennium BC
- Type site: Nagyrév
- Preceded by: Vučedol culture, Bell Beaker culture, Baden culture
- Followed by: Hatvan culture, Vatin culture, Vatya culture

The Nagyrév culture was a Bronze-Age culture that existed in what is now Nagyrév, Hungary. It existed alongside the Vatya culture and Hatvan cultures and was eventually superseded by the latter. The main style of pottery was a one or two handed cup with a tall funnel neck that is made in a black burnished ware. The earliest phase of the culture is also known as the Makó culture (a part of the broader Vučedol culture).

== The site ==
Nagyrév was located on the left bank of the Tisza which was at the western edge of a flood plain. Sand dunes and other mounds of earth indicated to archaeologists that burials were done in groups, sometimes with up to 6 or 7 buried in one area.

== Findings ==
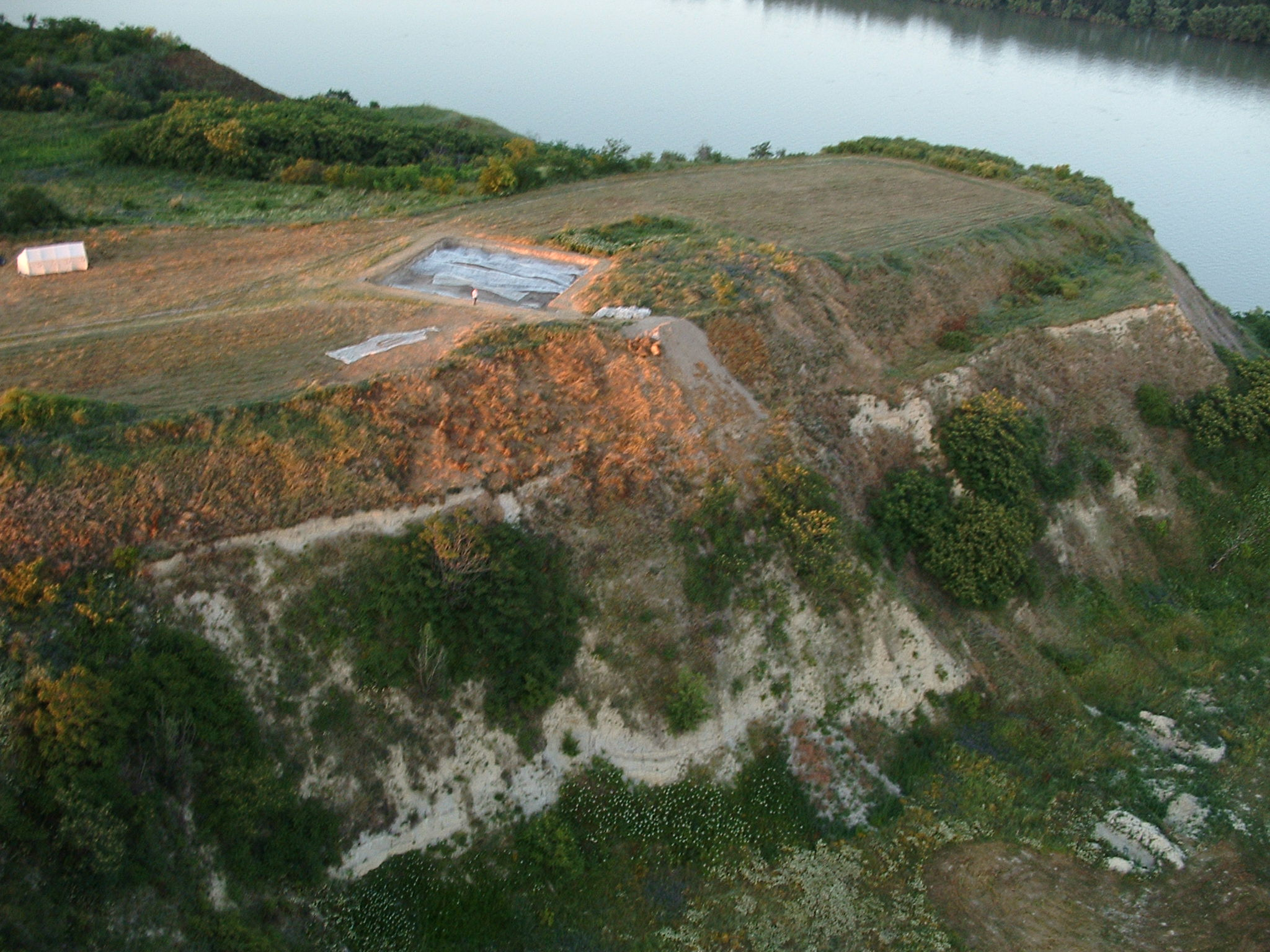
Százhalombatta-Földvár fortified settlement site, Hungary.

Most burials were of cremated remains and the ashes would either be spread on the ground of the site or occasionally placed in urns. Most graves contained up to fourteen pottery pieces that held food, water and other possessions for the journey to the after life.

Pottery vessels were decorated with geometric designs with a symbolic meaning. Some pots with diamond, square or arm like looking shapes were painted around the circumference of the vessels. These burials suggest that families were buried together and even close friends to the family were buried near each other.

== Gallery ==
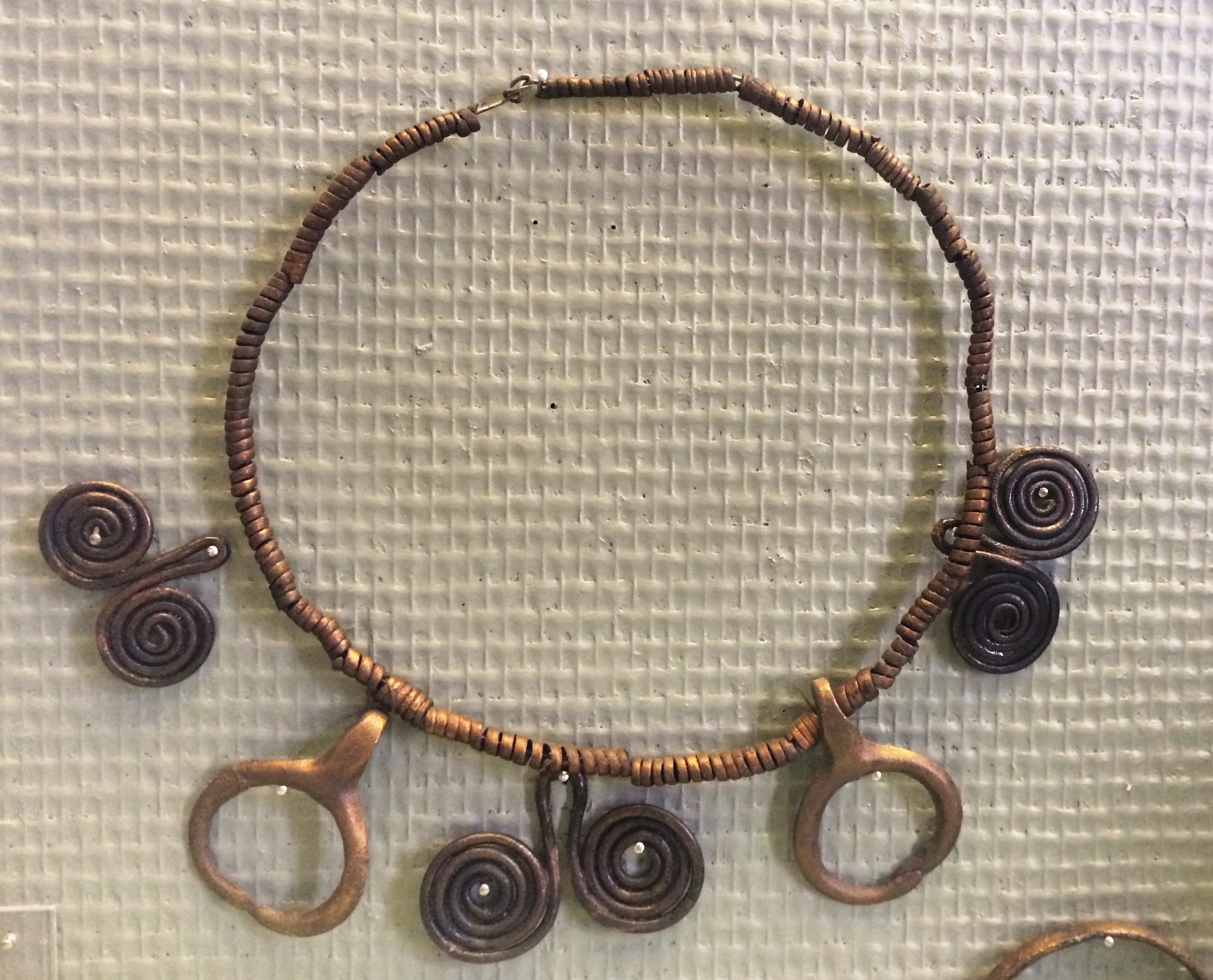
Bronze necklace

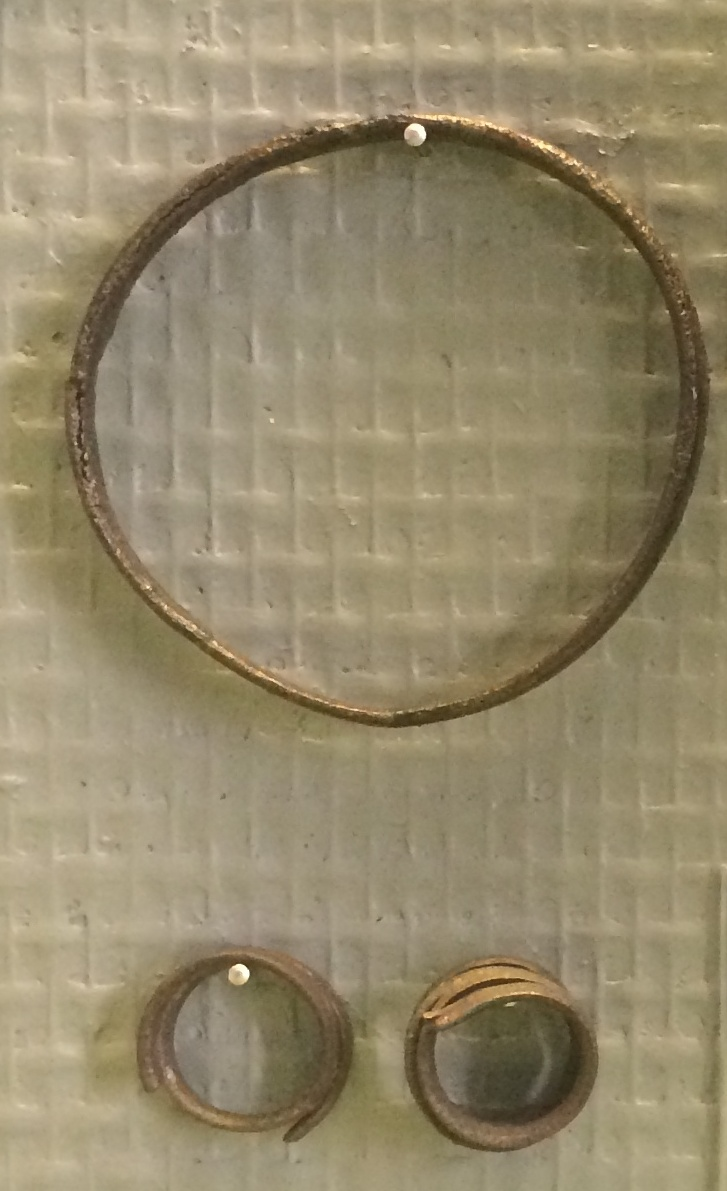
Bronze ornaments

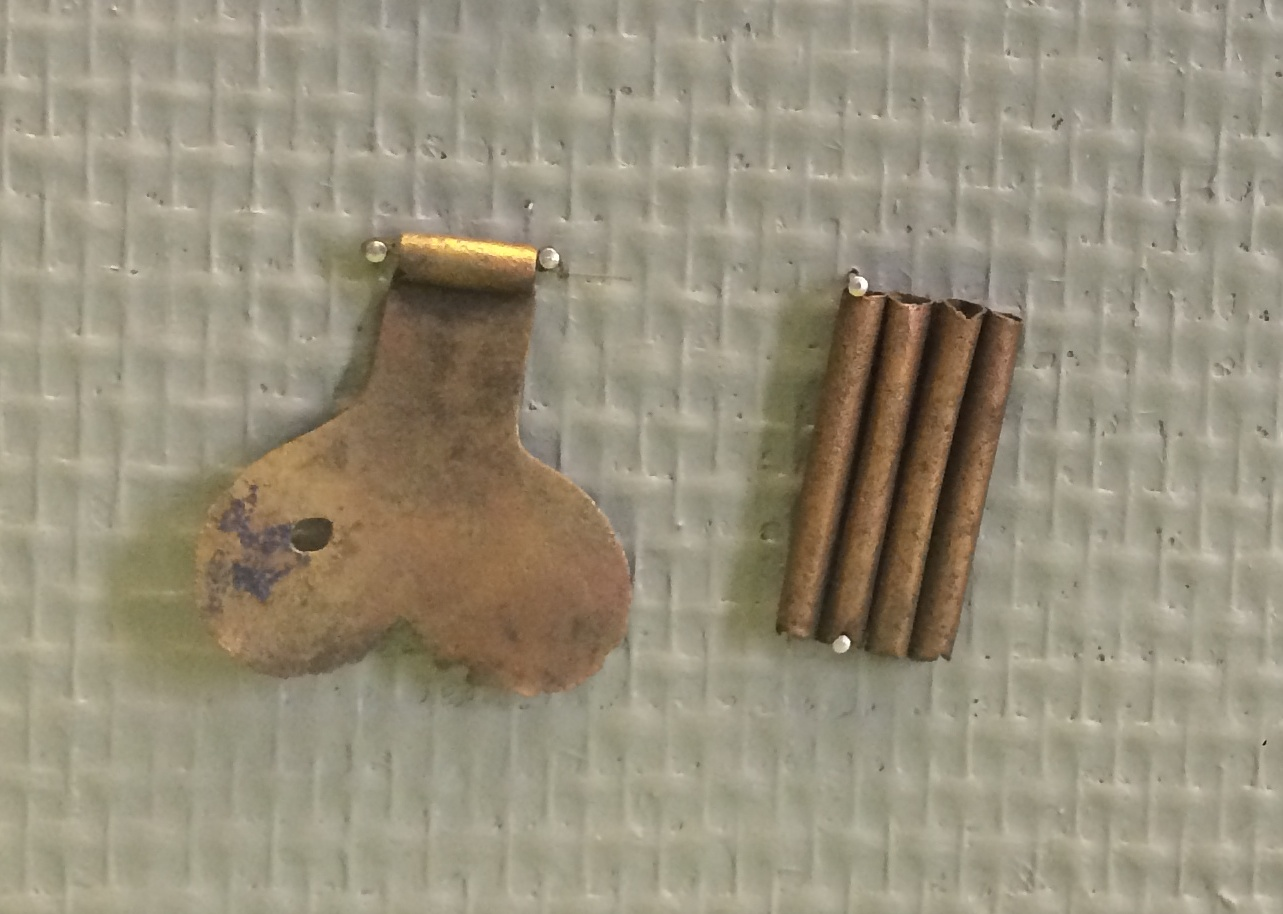
Bronze ornaments

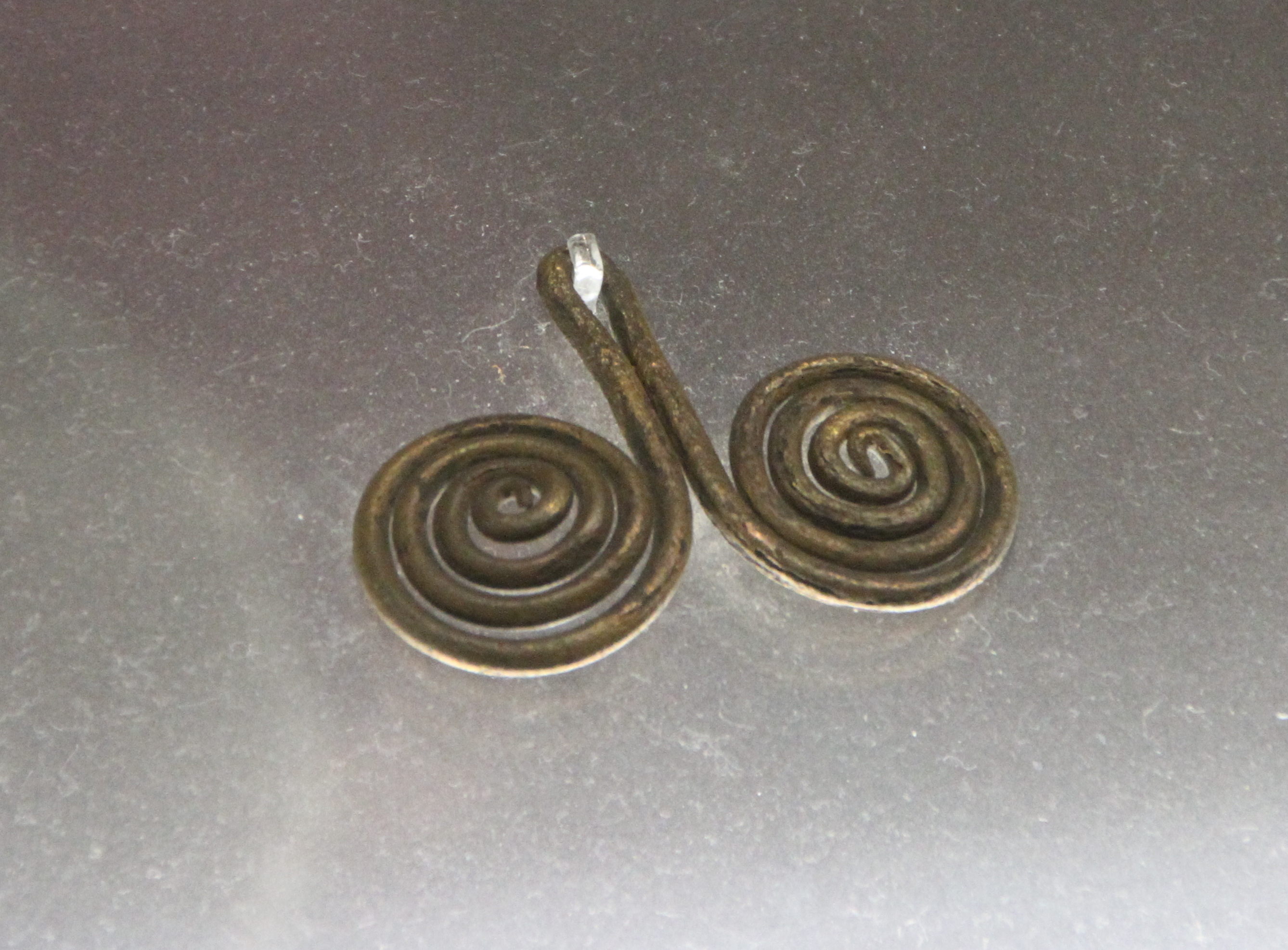
Bronze ornament

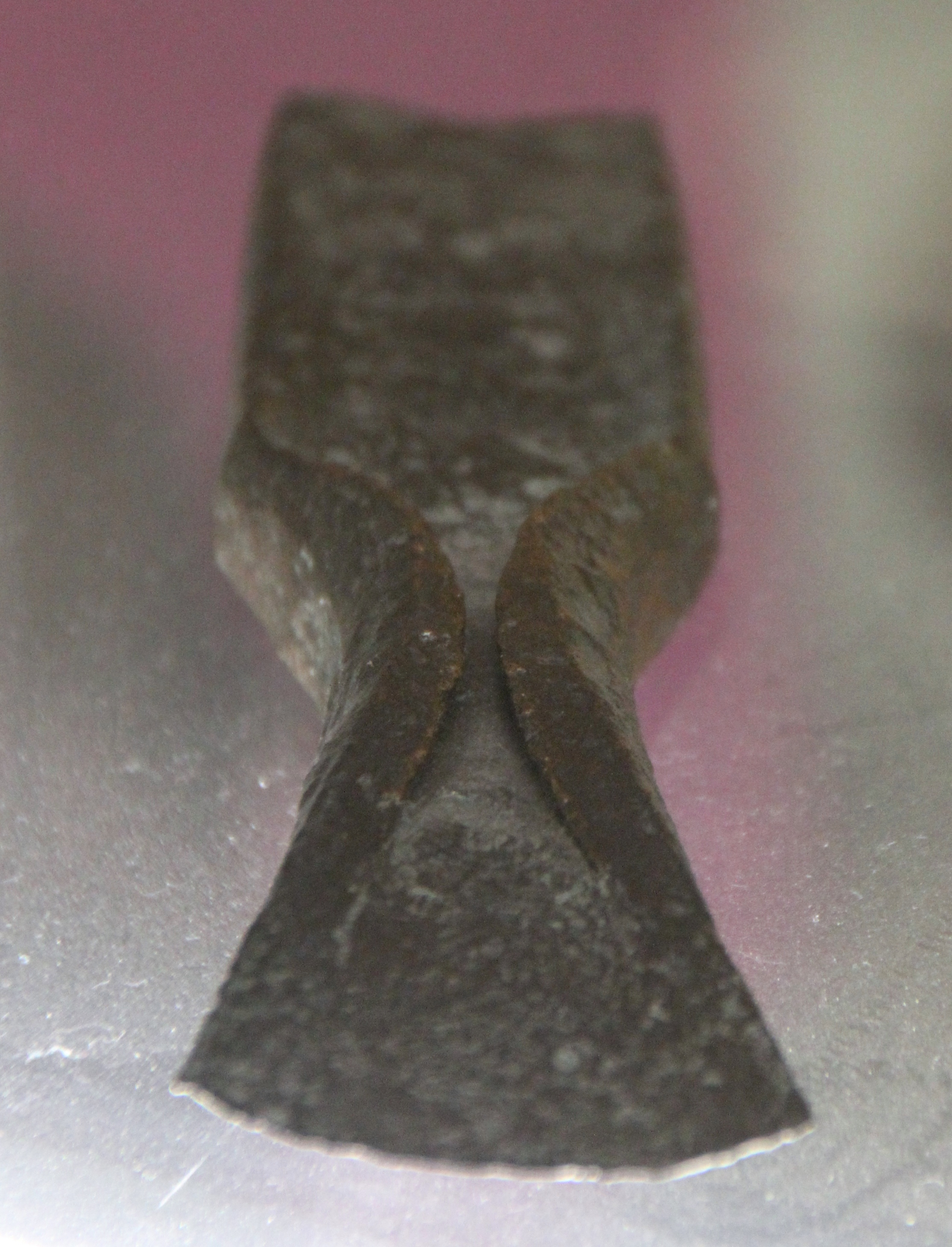
Bronze axe

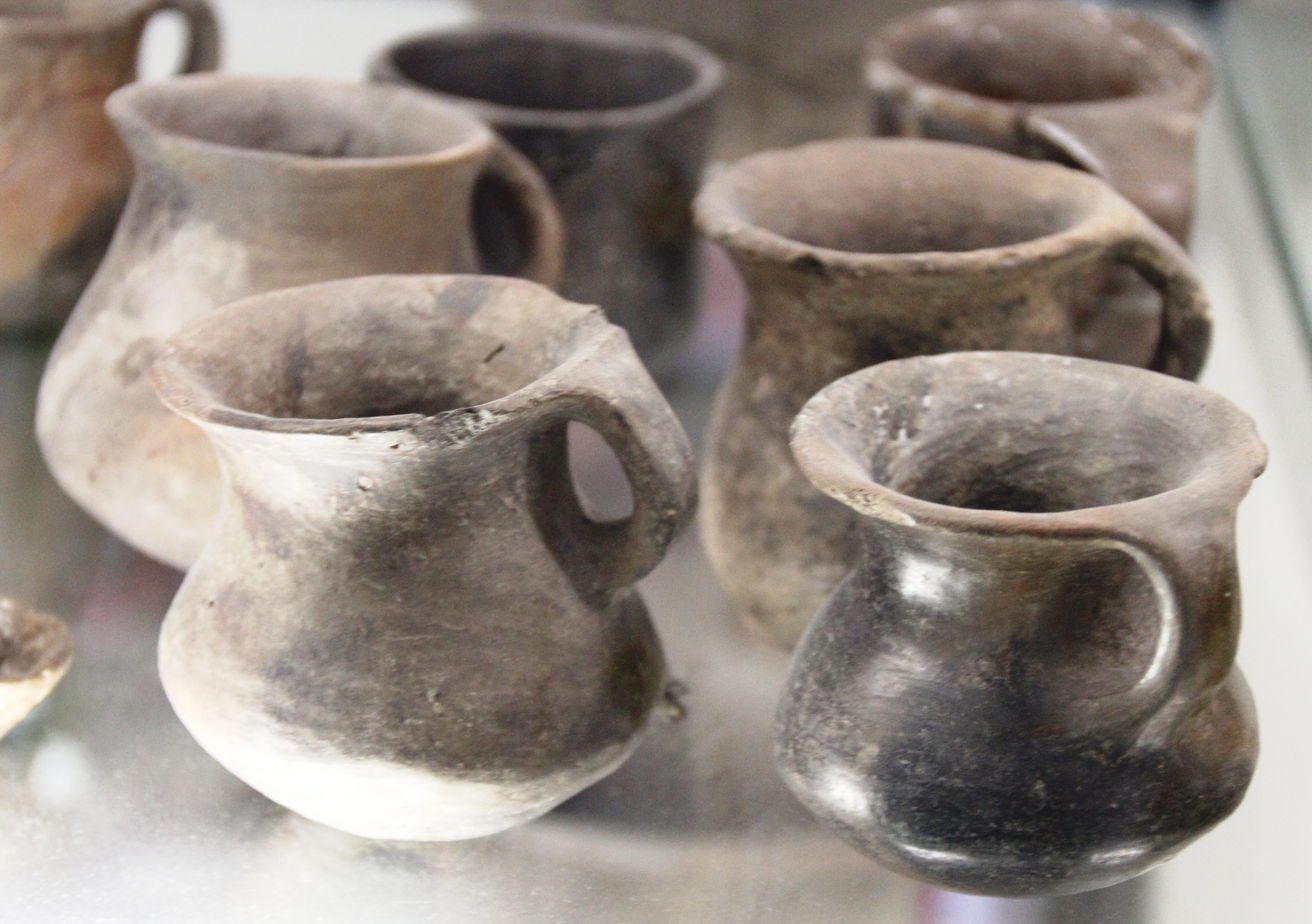
Cups

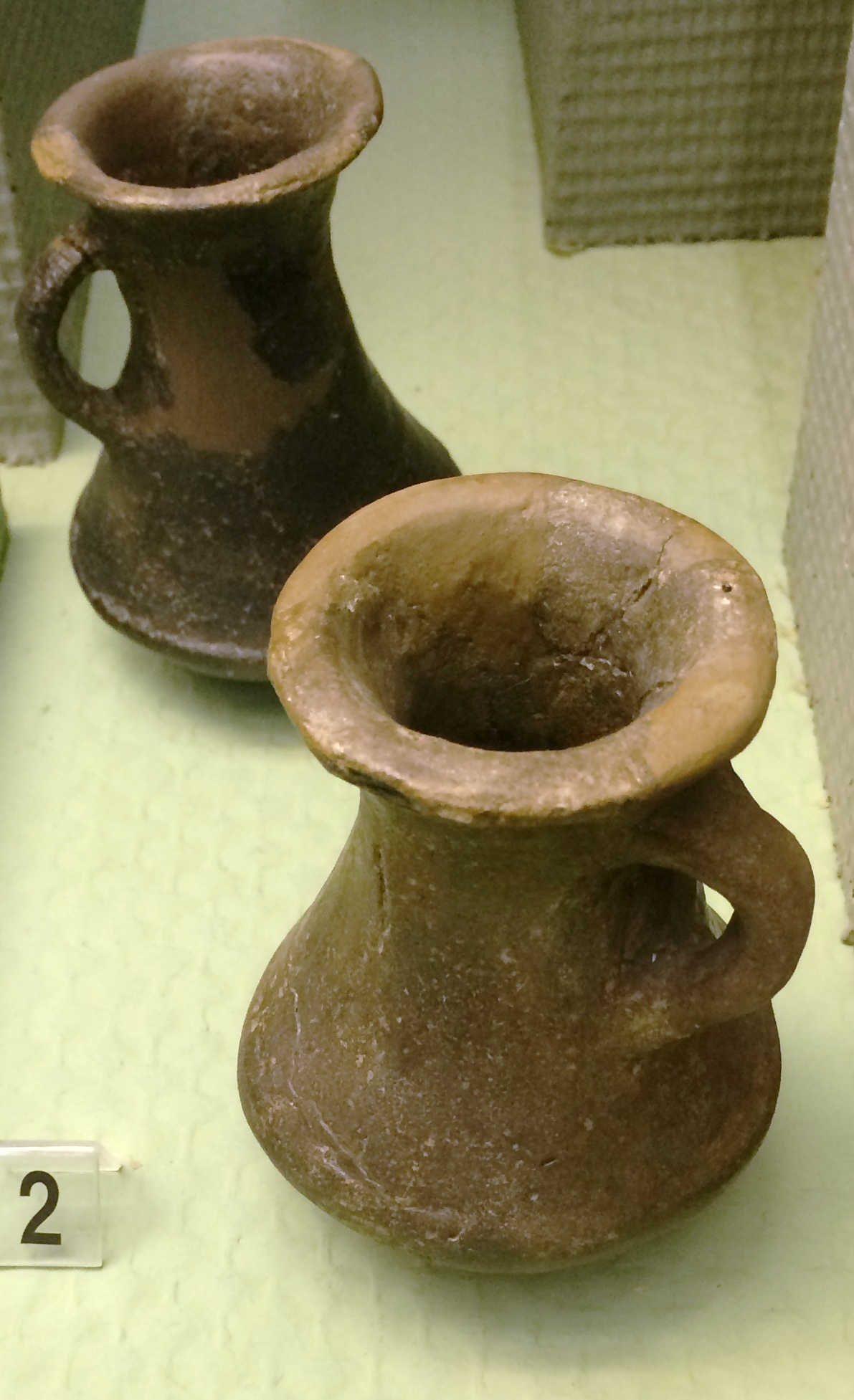
Cups

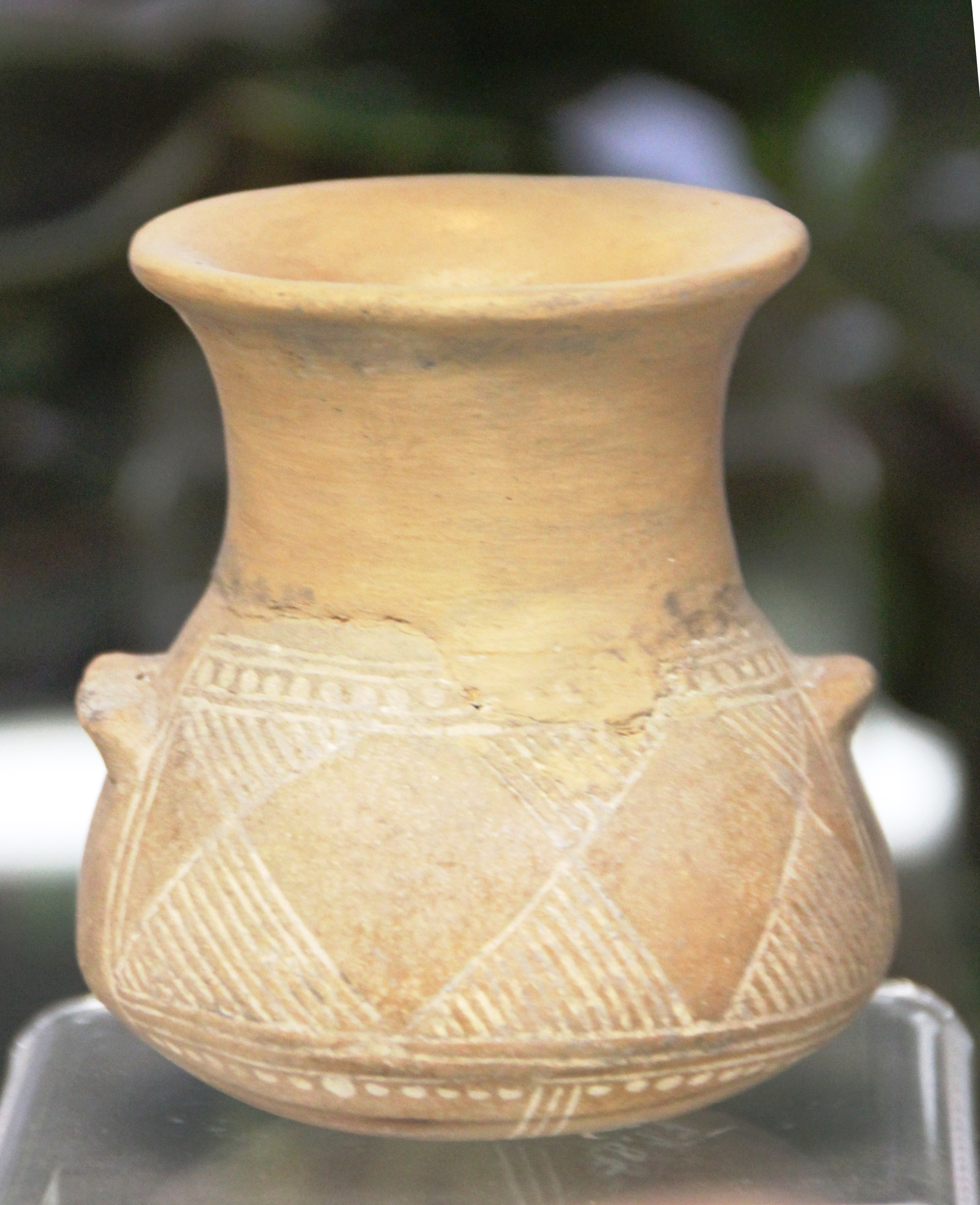
Ceramic vessel

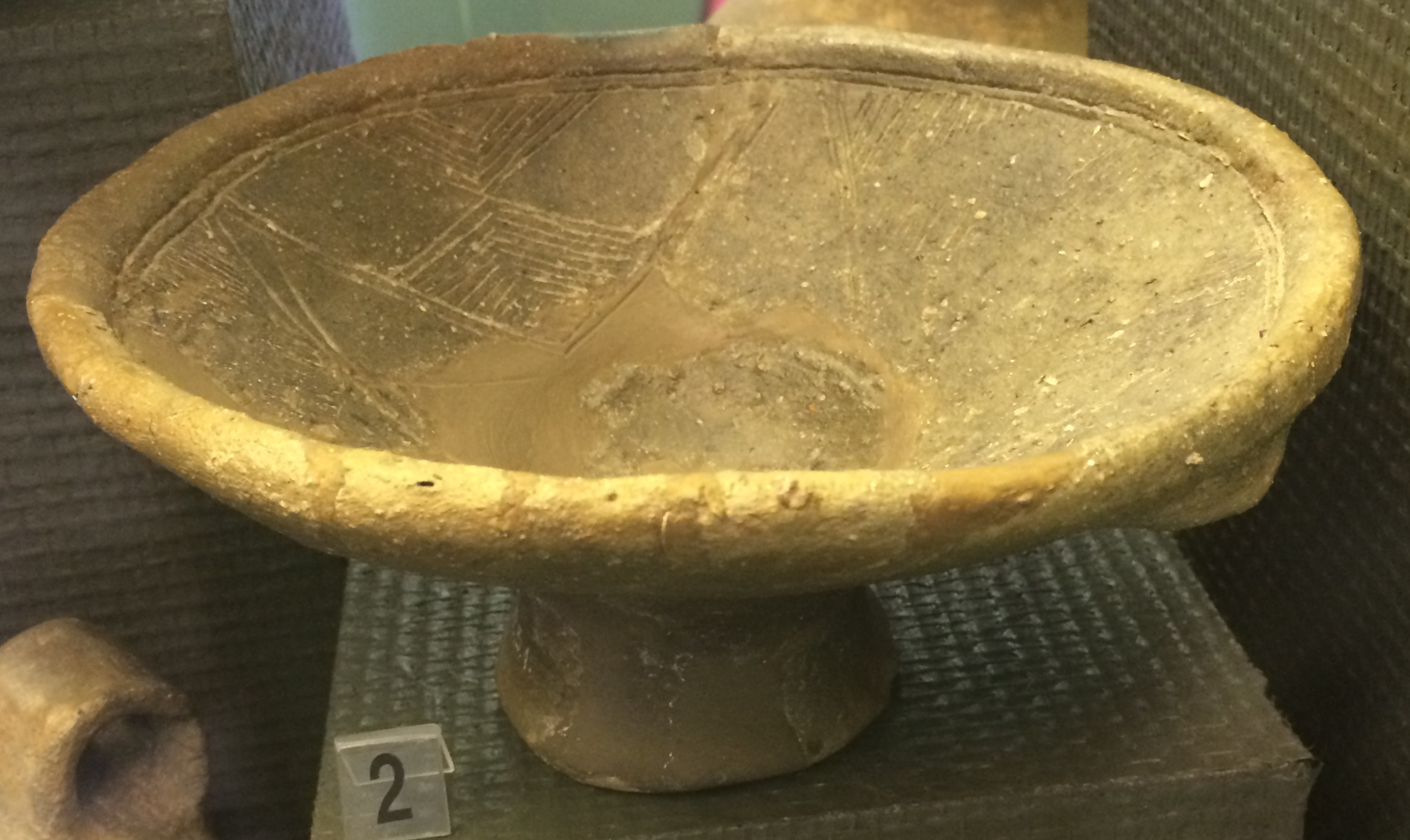

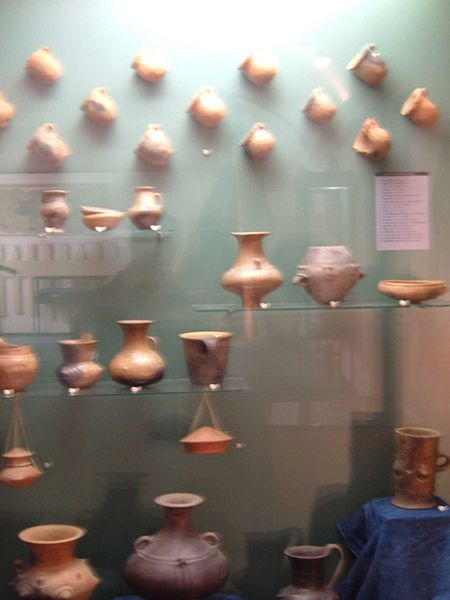
Pottery

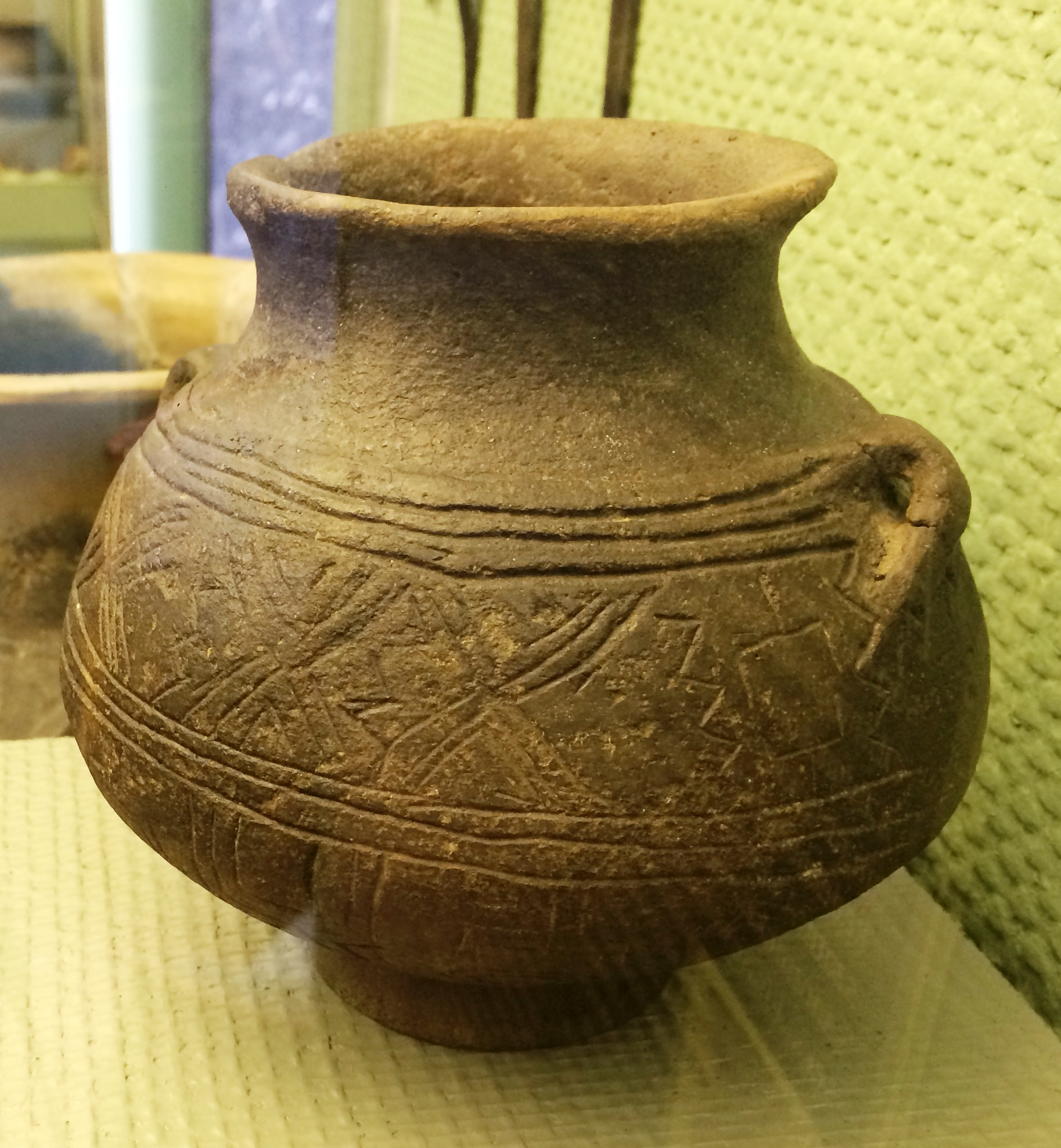
Ceramic vessel.
