= Hatvan =

- Town
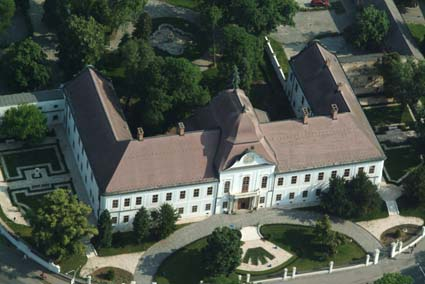
- Grassalkovich Palace

- Flag Coat of arms

- Location within Hungary
- Coordinates: 47°40′5″N 19°40′11″E
- Country: Hungary
- County: Heves
- District: Hatvan

Area
  - Total: 80.66 km^{2} (31.14 sq mi)

Population (2019)
  - Total: 20,228
  - Density: 250.8/km^{2} (649.5/sq mi)
- Time zone: UTC+1 (CET)
  - Summer (DST): UTC+2 (CEST)
- Postal code: 3000
- Area code: (+36) 37
- Website: hatvan.hu

Hatvan [ˈhɒtvɒn] (German: Hottwan) is a town in Heves County, Hungary. It is the county's third most populous town following Eger and Gyöngyös.

== Etymology ==
Hatvan is the Hungarian word for "sixty". It is a common urban legend that the town got this name because it is 60 km from Budapest, but in fact the name is already mentioned in medieval sources, many years before the kilometre existed; also, the actual distance between the capital and the town is closer to 50 km.

Rather, the town's name likely derives from the Pecheneg root word "chatwan" or "chatman", meaning "small-tribe" or "splinter-group". This is because the Turkic Pechenegs were divided into small groups when they were settled into the early Kingdom of Hungary.

== History ==
The area around Hatvan has been inhabited since the Neolithic. Archeological evidence suggests that both sides of the Zagyva river were inhabited at this point. A significant settlement took shape in the Copper Age, which existed until the early Bronze Age. Around 1900 BC, tribes of pastoralists from the east made their way into the Carpathian Basin where they eventually settled. Following the Bronze Age, no permanent settlements existed around Hatvan until the 1170s, however archeological evidence suggests Scythians, Celts, Roxolani, Sarmatians, Avars, and eventually Magyars passed through the region.

In the 1170s, Premonstratensians established a permanent settlement where today's Hatvan sits. The monastery they established slowly grew in significance, and was first documented in writing in 1235. The monks drained swamps in the area, and developed the land for agriculture, drawing increasing numbers of people to settle the area around the monastery in the 13th century.

Following the Congress of Visegrád in 1355, the settlement grew in significance, since a road connecting Buda and Kraków was constructed passing through it. Louis I of Hungary passed through the settlement multiple times leading his forces on campaigns into Lithuania, and eventually Hatvan was officially granted the status of market town.

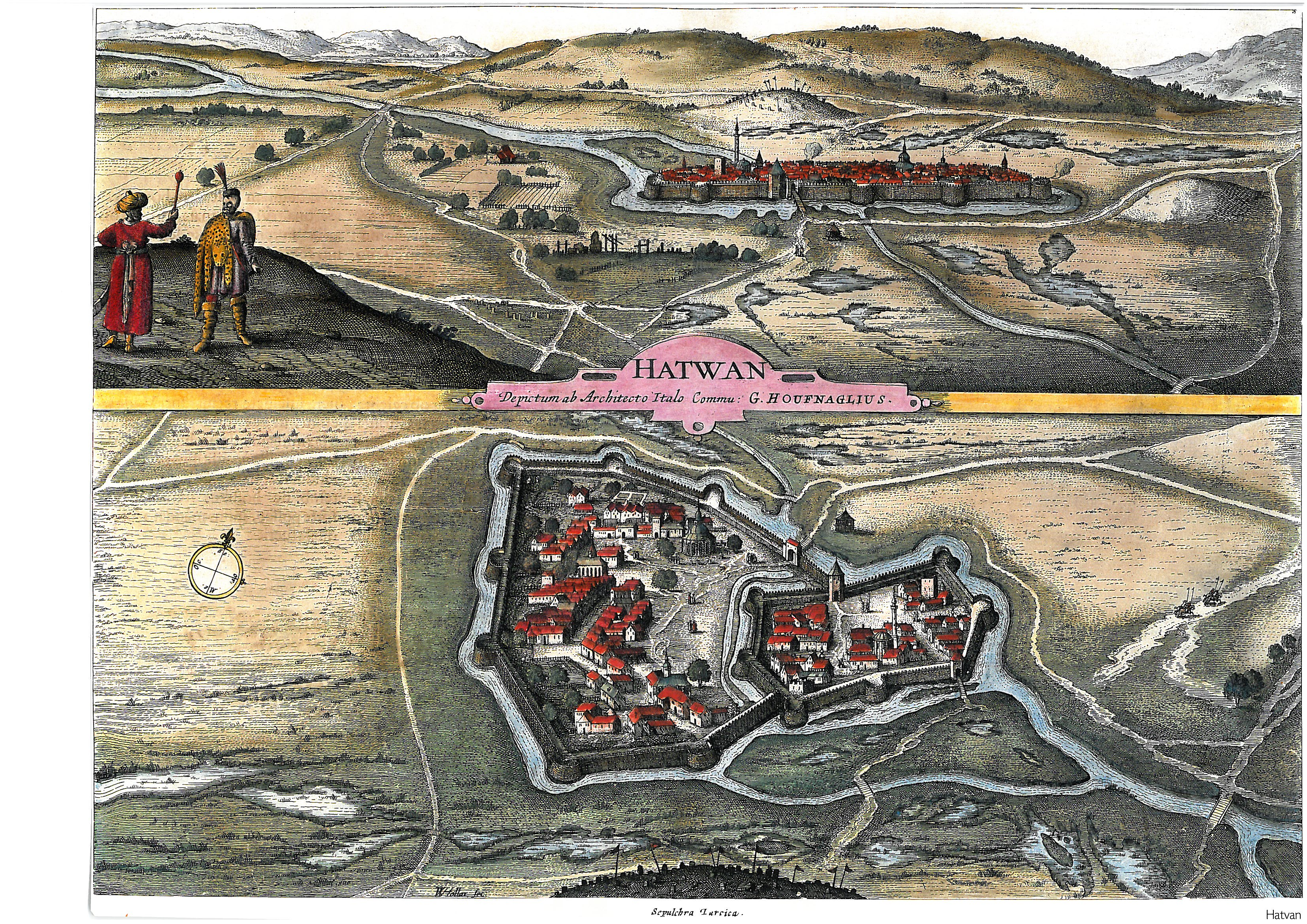
Hatvan at the end of the 16th century

After the occupying Ottoman pasha of Buda Mehmed Yahya Pashazade pushed his armies north and captured Visegrád and Nógrád in 1544, the captains of Hatvan's freshly constructed castle made the decision to burn their fortifications down, lest they fall under Turkish control. The town's soldiers and leadership withdrew to Eger, leaving its citizens to be captured by Ottoman forces shortly after. The Ottomans made Hatvan the head of their newly conquered sanjak, causing such a large influx of Turkish soldiers and officials that by the 17th century the local Hungarians became a minority in the city. The Turks reinforced the city with an extensive system of fortifying pile walls, which they made fireproof by caking them with clay.

In 1594, an unsuccessful attempt to retake the town was made by Upper Hungarian forces. Two years later, in 1596, Maximilian III was able to retake the town following a three week long siege, but it was quickly retaken by an Ottoman army led by Mehmed III. The town was briefly recaptured by Hermann Christof von Russwurm in 1603, but fell promptly back into Turkish hands. The Turkish occupation finally came to an end in 1686 following the Siege of Buda, and the town was restored to Hungarian control.

Between the 17th and 18th centuries, the town was populated mostly by serfs, who mostly practiced animal husbandry, but also started tending vineyards. Following the defeat of the Ottomans, Hatvan was reintegrated into Hungarian society: In 1689 the town gained postal service, in 1693 a customs office was built, and by 1700 the local parish resumed operation.

== Sport ==
The association football club FC Hatvan is based in Hatvan.

== Twin towns – sister cities ==
Hatvan is twinned with:

- Barberino Tavarnelle, Italy
- Berehove, Ukraine
- Ignalina, Lithuania
- Kokkola, Finland
- Maassluis, Netherlands
- Nižný Hrušov, Slovakia
- Prachatice, Czech Republic
- Østfold, Norway
- Târgu Secuiesc, Romania

== Notable people ==
- József Ágoston (1800–1860), lawyer and politician
- Éva Balatoni (1957-present), opera singer
- Endre Gerelyes (1935–1973), writer and university professor
