= Endre Fotland Knudsen =

Norwegian footballer (born 1988)

Endre Fotland Knudsen (born 9 July 1988) is a retired Norwegian football midfielder.

He joined Lyn in 2007 from the club's youth ranks, and during 2007, 2008 and 2009 he played 21 games and scored 4 goals in the Eliteserien. He also played 7 times for the Norway national under-19 football team in 2007 and 7 times for the Norway national under-21 football team in 2008. Lyn went bankrupt in 2010, and Knudsen trained with Manglerud Star until joining Lyn Fotball in August. Following a stint in Røros IL in 2013–14 he returned to Lyn and played there through 2015.
