= Endre Gerelyes =

Hungarian writer and professor

- Born: 15 August 1935; Hatvan, Hungary
- Died: 6 April 1973; Budapest, Hungary
- Occupation: Novelist
- Writing career
- Notable works: Kilenc perc Isten veled, Lancelot! Tigris

Endre Gerelyes (1935–1973) was a Hungarian novelist, short story writer and Hungarian literature professor at József Attila University in Szeged. His main works are Kövek között (1961), Töprengés az éjszakáról (1963), Ki vagy te? - Ábel! (1967), Isten veled, Lancelot! (1973), Tigris (1975). A selection of his short stories Kilenc perc (1985) and a collection of letters Tavaszi futás (1986) were published posthumously.
