= Judit Varga (composer) =

Hungarian composer and pianist (born 1979)

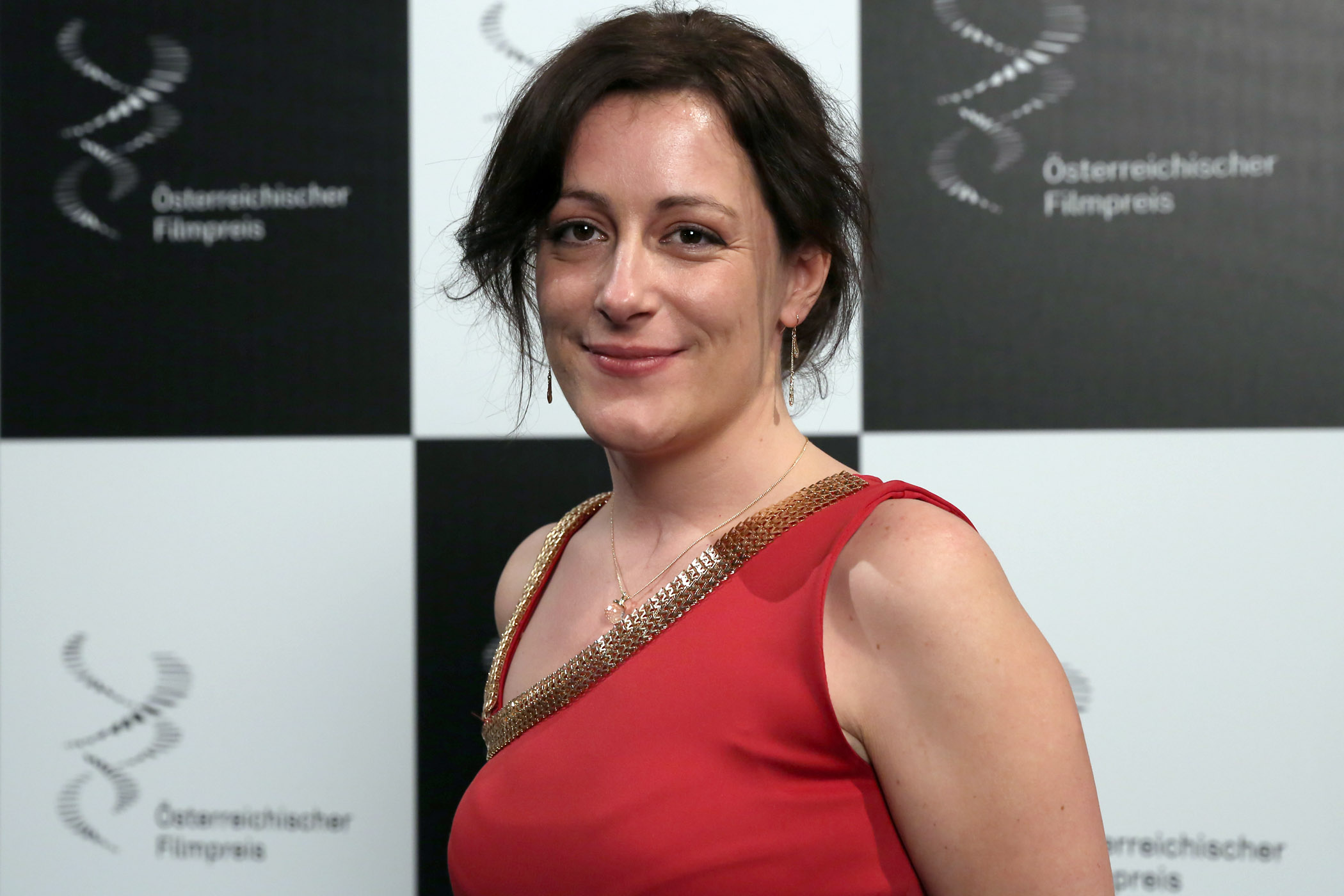
- Varga in 2014
- Born: 12 January 1979 (age 47); Győr, Hungary
- Occupations: composer, pianist and university lecturer
- Years active: present

Judit Varga (born 12 January 1979) is an Erkel Ferenc Prize and Béla Bartók - Ditta Pásztory Award winner Hungarian composer, pianist and university lecturer.

She is known for contemporary classical music compositions as well as for composing for motion pictures and theatre pieces. As a solo pianist and chamber musician, she performed in many countries, on prestigious festivals. She is looking for new impulses both as a musician and as a teacher. The two primary platforms of her studies and work are Vienna and Budapest.

== Career ==
She started her studies at the Liszt Ferenc Music School in Győr, where she played the piano and the flute. She then attended the Béla Bartók School in Budapest. At the age of 16, she had already received scholarships to foreign summer courses. In 2005 she graduated with honors at the Franz Liszt Academy of Music, where she studied piano and composition. In the meantime she was admitted to the University of Music and Performing Arts Vienna too, to the media composition and applied music, piano and composition faculties, and since 2013 she is a PhD student there.

Since September 2013 she has been teaching composition and film music composition at the composition department of the Liszt Ferenc Academy of Music, while at the University of Music and Performing Arts in Vienna she teaches ear training and analysis to the students of the composition and conducting departments.

At the beginning of the 2000s, she used to be a tutor of the singer, string and flute classes of the Austrian Master Classes in Zell an der Pram and of their master classes in Vienna. At the Richter János High School of Music in Győr she was teaching composition, score reading, music theory and orchestration. In 2008 she led the piano class of the Maria Regina Volksschule in Vienna and she was a silent film pianist as well.

Her compositions are performed worldwide in such prestigious concert halls and festivals as the Wien Modern, the Hungarian State Opera House, the Philharmonie de Paris, the Juilliard School in New York, the CAFe Budapest Contemporary Arts Festival, the Mini Festival, the Konzerthaus and Musikverein Wien, the Muffathalle Munich and the Warsaw Autumn. They are part of the repertoire of Hungarian and foreign bands like the Ensemble Modern, the BBC Symphony Orchestra, the Vienna Radio Symphony Orchestra, the Hungarian State Opera Orchestra, the UMZE Ensemble, the Concerto Budapest, the Ensemble Kontrapunkte, the Riot Ensemble London, the ensemble XX. jahrhundert (eXXj) and the Hungarian Radio Choir. All of her compositions were commissioned.

She performed on many stages all around the world as a solo pianist and chamber musician. In 2016 her opera, Love, which is an adaptation of the classic film of Tibor Déry, Károly Makk and Péter Bacsó, debuted in the Hungarian State Opera House as part of the memorial year of the Hungarian Revolution of 1956. In 2019 she was awarded with the TONALi19 composer award for her piano solo, Pendulum. This also means that said composition will be performed by the participants of the piano competition of the TONALi Festival in the Elbphilharmonie.

Beside contemporary classical music, she is particularly interested in scoring motion pictures and theatre pieces, and in the compositions written for multimedia events. In 2013, when the Prima Primissima Prize has undergone a complete renewal, she was entrusted to design the new musical image. She composed music for more than 30 theatre pieces and films. In 2014 the Academy of Austrian Film awarded best soundtrack to Deine Schönheit ist nichts Wert (Your Beauty is Worth Nothing...). In autumn, the Konzerthaus of Vienna commissioned her to compose new music score for a Bolshevik Soviet propaganda silent film from 1924, The Extraordinary Adventures of Mr. West in the Land of the Bolsheviks. The renewed film premiered in March 2016. Approximately 30% of her work is made up of composing for films.

She is a member of the Hungarian Composers' Union, the Austrian Composers' Association and the Studio 5 composer group. The latter was founded in 2017 and they aim to organize concerts that can bridge tradition and innovation.

== Main works ==
=== Operas ===
Title	Date
Love	2016

=== Orchestral works ===
Compositions for Orchestra
Title	Date
I. Piano Concerto	1996–1997
Quasi una cadenza	2004–2005
Le Temps retrouvé	2008
Concerto Rivolutionario	2009
Concerto Imaginario	2011
...alles Fleisch... – in memoriam Zoltán Gyöngyössy	2013
Urlicht	2015
JUMP!	2017

Compositions for String Orchestra
Title	Date
Mosar II	2019
Black and White	2018
Hallgató-Pergető	2009–2010

=== Ensemble ===
Title	Date
Schlaflied für Johanna	2001
Berceuse	2001
Kammerkonzert für Klarinette und Ensemble	2003–2004
In memoriam J.V.	2004
Pavane	2005
...sweeter than roses...	2010
Entitas	2012
Speak Low	2013
13 Lieder (for bass clarinet and ensemble)	2013
Broken Beauty	2018

=== Chamber music ===
Title	Date
Auge	2001
Streichquartett II	2002
~opra01~	2002
Streichquartett IIB	2003
Möbiusband	2003
Dialog	2004
Dialog (2. Version)	2004–2005
Strictly Ballroom I	2005
Strictly Ballroom III	2005
Klavierquintett	2007
Dietro la musica	2013
Songs for a Waiting	2013–2014
Mosar	2017
Puzzle (Black Hole Edition)	2018
Escapex2	2019

=== Vocal music ===
Title	Date
Mégis	1998
Levél	1999
Harbach	2000
Mad(á)rigál	2005
The L.I.F.E.	2005
Schlummert ein	2014
Pocket Requiem	2017
A Wreath	2018
Pie Jesu	2018
The Night	2018
#perspektiven:los	2019

=== Solo Instrument ===
Title	Date
Words	2005
10 Portraits for Viola	2010
Barcarole pour Frédéric et George	2010
Sonatine	2013
13 Lieder (for bass clarinet and live electronics)	2005
Fanfaren	2017
Centipede	2017
Pendulum	2019

=== Film Scores ===
Title	Nationality, Genre, Producer	Date
Heim	(Austria) Austria Short | Drama Filmakademie Wien	2010
Das Pferd auf dem Balkon	(Austria) Austria Drama Minifilm	2012
Deine Schönheit ist nichts Wert Güzelliğin On Par'etmez	(Turkey) Austria Turkey Drama Dor Film, Filmakademie Wien, MarangozFilm	2012
Lou Andreas-Salomé, The Audacity to be Free	(Switzerland) Germany Austria Italy Switzerland Biography | Drama | Romance Avanti Media Fiction, Tempest Film, KGP Kranzelbinder Gabriele Production	2015
Mr West	(Austria) Soviet Union, Austria Silent movie | Comedy Vienna Konzerthaus	2016 (eredeti: 1924)
The Legend of the Ugly King	(Austria) Germany, Austria Documentary | Biography Mitosfilm, Aichholzer Filmproduktion, MarangozFilm	2017
Gypsy Queen	(Austria) Germany, Austria Drama | Sport Dor Film-West Produktionsgesellschaft, Dor Film Produktionsgesellschaft, ARTE	(completed)

=== Dance Theatre Music ===
Title	Premiere	Theatre
7 Encounters	2010	Palais Kabelwerk, Vienna

=== Theatre Music ===
Title	Premiere	Theatre
Bertolt Brecht: Man is Man	1998
August Strindberg, Friedrich Dürrenmatt: Play Strindberg!	2001	Éjszakai Theatre, Budapest
Zoltán Egressy: Vesztett éden	2003	Pinceszínház (Cellar Theater), Budapest
Anton Chekhov: The Seagull	2004	István Örkény Theatre, Budapest
Sándor Márai: Fizess nevetve	2008	Éjszakai Theatre and Pinceszínház (Cellar Theater), Budapest
Sándor Márai: Portraits of a Marriage - The real thing	2009	Pinceszínház (Cellar Theater), Budapest
Leonid Zorin: A Warsaw Melody	2010	Pinceszínház (Cellar Theater), Budapest
Géza Csáth: A Pertics Janika	2011	Pinceszínház (Cellar Theater), Budapest
Robert Thomas: Trap for a Single Man (Szegény Dániel)	2012	Karinthy Színház, Budapest
Niels Peter Juel Larsen: Blixen bárónő szerelmei	2014	Centrál Színház, Budapest

== Discography ==
Singles
Album	Publisher	Year	Other
Lou Andreas-Salome	Avanti	2016	Original Motion Picture Soundtrack

Compilation albums
Work(s)	Album	Publisher	Year	Other
Schlaflied für Johanna	Volksmusik - 6. Komponistenforum Mittersill	ein_klang Records	2002
Strictly Ballroom III	born to be off-road	ein_klang Records	2005	CD1
Variationen Für Klavier 1, Variationen Für Klavier 2, Variationen Für Klavier 3	The Next Generation	ORF, ORF Funkhaus	2005
Opra 01, Quasi Prologue, Fließend Bewegt, Febbrile, Poco Feroce	ÖEGZM Vol. 4: Mixed Chamber Music 4 Gemischte Kammermusik 4^{Thürauer, Dimitrova, Varga, Bolcsó, Szakács}	Ton 4 Records	2009	CD, performed by OEGZM^{(Österreichische Gesellschaft für zeitgenössische Musik)}
Le Temps retrouvé	Új Magyar Zenei Fórum 2009 zeneszerzőverseny (New Hungarian Music Forum 2009 composers' competition)	BMC HMIC	2010	2 CD
Képzelt zongoraverseny	Új Magyar Zenei Fórum 2011 zeneszerzőverseny (New Hungarian Music Forum 2011 composers' competition)	BMC HMIC	2011	Performer: Concerto Budapest
A Fly's Life and Decline	Sunfire	The Twiolins MarieLuise & Christoph Dingler	2014
Entitas for twelve musicians (2012)	Woher? Wohin? – Mythen, Nation, Identitäten	EM Medien	2017	Clemens Heil, Ensemble Modern, 2 CD
Judit Varga Showreel	Austrian Film Composers’ Showreel Vol. 2	Österreichischer Komponistenbund	2018	DVD

== Awards ==
- 1st prize – Franz Liszt Academy of Music (LFZE) Composer Competition, Budapest (1998)
- 1st prize – LFZE Composer Competition, Budapest (1999)
- SKE Special Award – Social and cultural support from austro mechana - SKE Fonds, Vienna (2003)
- 2nd prize – LFZE Composer Competition, Budapest (2003)
- 2nd prize – LFZE Composer Competition, Budapest (2004)
- Special Award – Liszt Ferenc International Piano Competition, Pécs (2005)
- Dryard Prize – Vienna International Pianists Academy, Vienna (2006)
- Theodor Körner Prize (2009)
- 1st prize, Orchestra category – UMZF Composer Competition, Budapest (2009)
- State scholarship – BMUKK (Bundesministerium für Unterricht, Kunst und Kultur), Vienna (2010)
- 2nd prize, Orchestra category – New Hungarian Music Forum (UMZF) Composer Competition, Budapest (2011)
- Special Award – Ö1 Talentebörse-Kompositionspreis, Vienna (2012)
- Winner of the „Woher? Wohin? Mythen, Nation, Identitäten“ tender – Goethe-Institut, Ensemble Modern, Frankfurt (2012)
- Film Prize nominee, Best Soundtrack – 49. International Antalya Film Festival (2012)
- Film Prize nominee, Best Soundtrack – Austrian Film Academy (2013)
- Staatsstipendium – BMUKK (Bundesministerium für Unterricht, Kunst und Kultur), Vienna (2014)
- Film Prize, Best Soundtrack – Austrian Film Academy (Deine Schönheit ist nichts Wert, 2014)
- Winner of the Hungarian State Opera House's tender for the 60th anniversary of the Hungarian Revolution of 1956., Budapest (Love, 2016)
- Bartók Béla–Pásztory Ditta Prize (2017)
- „Call for scores” winner of the Riot Ensemble (Broken Beauty, 2018)
- Erkel Ferenc Prize (2018)
- Istvánffy Benedek Prize (Pocket Requiem, 2018)
- TONALi Prize – Tonali Classical Music Competition and Festival (Pendulum, 2019)
