= Șanțul Mare =

Heritage site in Arad County, Romania

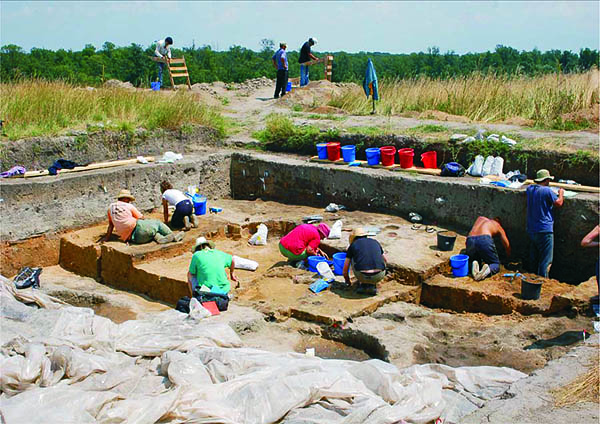
- Archaeological Site Şanţul Mare, Pecica, Romania, 2008
- Interactive map of Șanțul Mare

Şanţul Mare (The Big Ditch) is an important archaeological site located 9 km west of Pecica, Arad County, Romania (previously named Rovine), near the border with Semlac commune and 600 m from the river Mureș.

Multiple archaeological layers have been discovered, including the Bronze Age Pecica culture and a large Dacian town, most likely Ziridava.

"Șanțul Mare" is a mound located on the right bank of Mureş river, with an oval shape measuring 120 m in length and 60–70 m in width. The long axis of the mound has a north-east–west orientation, being parallel with the course of the river. The mound is part of a fluvial terrace, which was separated by a huge moat surrounding it on all sides, with the exception of the east-south-east side. There, a steep slope is separating it from the terrace through which the Mureş flows today. Because of this unique location, the mound is heavily fortified, but it is not yet known whether it was naturally separated from the rest of the terrace by an older arm of the river or this type of fortification was done by people, artificially.

== History ==
The earliest research at "Şanţul Mare" was done by J. Hampel and Fl. Romer in 1870 and proved the extraordinary importance of the tell. The amateur archaeologist Lazlo Dömötör continued with digs in 1898–1900, 1901 and 1902, and the majority of known Dacian artifacts came from these efforts (until new excavations started in the 1960s). Most of these materials have remained unpublished and are kept in the Arad Museum Complex.

Since 1910 the site started to be researched by the archaeologist M. Roska. Being among the pioneers of scientific archaeology, Roska, is the first that helped to clarify the chronological and cultural classification of the various horizons captured here. The excavations of 1910–1911, 1923 and 1924 identified a substantial dwelling of Middle Bronze Age, the Mureş culture (originally called Periam-Pecica). The reports reviewed only Bronze Age strata, but also that of the Middle Copper Age.

D. Popescu also probed the site in 1943, and after validating the chronological horizons identified by Roska, he drew attention to some remains of La Tène Period and Migration Period.

Despite finding Dacian materials, all previous campaigns focused on the Bronze Age. This triggered new major excavations in the 1960s under the leadership of archaeologist Ion Horaţiu Crişan, together with E. Dörner. They highlighted the existence of an important Dacian settlement and of a cemetery from 11th–13th century.

Since 2005 the investigations were resumed at the site. The archaeological site Pecica – Şanţul Mare was the winner of a $250,000 grant obtained from the National Science Foundation (USA), following a project by Arad Museum Complex in partnership with Museum of Banat and University of Michigan (USA). The research objectives included deepening the dig to the sterile areas excavated in the previous campaign and further site study. The new excavations have identified the Dacian and Late Bronze Age layers, and charred remains of grains, animal bones and parts from a metal workshop have been recovered. Also, a detailed topographic map of the tell neighborhoods has been created. The team included: George Pascu Hurezan – Scientific Lead (Arad Museum Complex), Florin Drașovean, Alexandru Szentmiklosi (Museum of Banat), John M. O'Shea, Sarah Sherwood (University of Michigan), Alex W. Barker (University of Missouri).

In 2008, new research objectives were proposed including deepening excavation to sterile areas excavated in the previous campaign, further site study and identifying residential structures from the Middle Bronze Age. The deepening continued within the same area (10 × 10 m) and the Middle Bronze Age layer was reached.

== Gallery ==
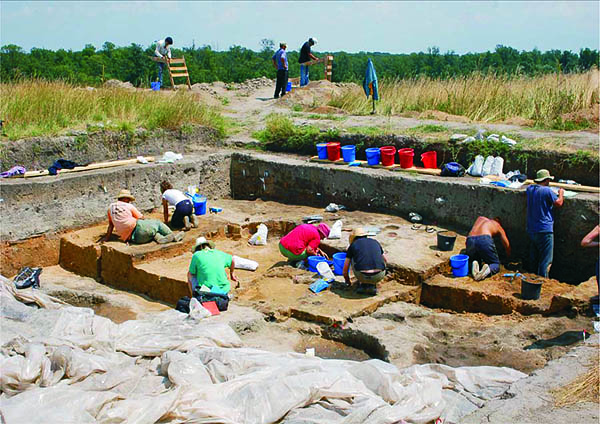

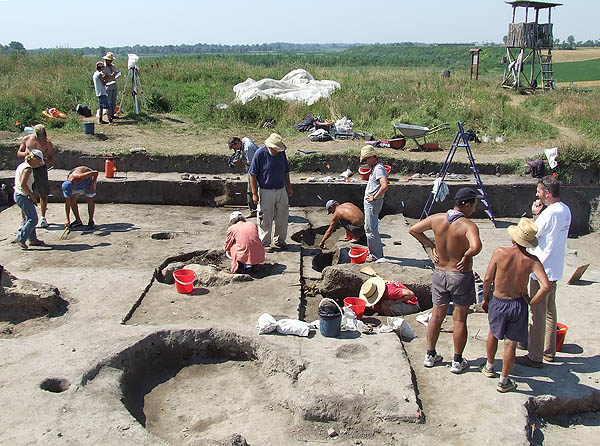

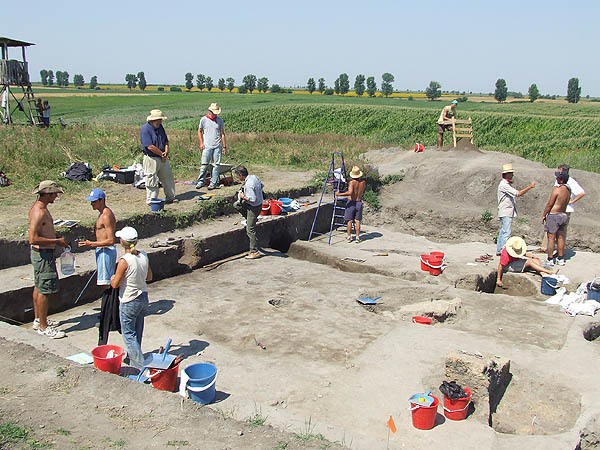

== See also ==
- Pecica culture
- Romanian archaeology
- Dacian davae
- List of ancient cities in Thrace and Dacia
- Dacia
- Roman Dacia
