= Ion Horațiu Crișan =

Romanian historian and archaeologist (1928–1994)

- Born: 7 July 1928; Ciumăfaia, Cluj County, Kingdom of Romania
- Died: 1 January 1994 (aged 65); Cluj-Napoca, Romania
- Scientific career
- Fields: History, Archaeology

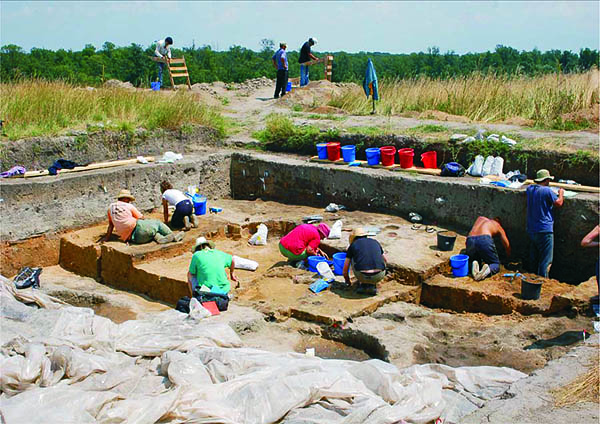
Archaeological Site Șanțul Mare, Pecica, Romania, 2008

Ioan Horațiu Carol Crișan (July 7, 1928–January 1, 1994) was a Romanian historian and archaeologist. He conducted research in South-Eastern and Central Europe, focusing on Geto-Dacians and Celts.

Crișan was born in Ciumăfaia, Cluj County and died in Cluj-Napoca, aged 65.

He was very involved with the research at the archaeological site called Șanțul Mare (The Big Ditch), 7 km (4.3 mi) from Pecica, Arad County. He placed the Dacian settlement Ziridava, mentioned by Ptolemy in his Geographia, at this location with a high degree of certainty. He wrote a book named Ziridava – The digs from "Șanțul Mare" from 1960, 1961, 1962, 1964, focused on the archaeological digs performed in 1960s at this ancient city.

== Bibliography ==
- Burebista and His Time, Volume 20 of Bibliotheca historica Romaniae: Monographies, Bucharest, Editura Academiei Republicii Socialiste România, 1978
- Ziridava - Săpăturile de la "Șanțul Mare" din anii 1960, 1961, 1962, 1964 (Ziridava – The digs from "Șanțul Mare" from 1960, 1961, 1962, 1964), Arad, Comitetul de Cultură și Educație Socialistă al Județului Arad, 1978
- Crișan's Bibliography at History Institute Cluj-Napoca

== See also ==
- Burebista
- Dacia
- List of Romanian archaeologists
- Romanian archaeology
