= Mureș =

Mureș may refer to:

- Mureș County, Romania
- Mureș (river) in Romania and Hungary (Maros)
- Mureș culture, a Bronze Age culture from Romania

== See also ==
- Târgu Mureș, the capital of Mureș County
- Ocna Mureș, a town in Alba County, Romania
