= Zurobara =

Dacian town

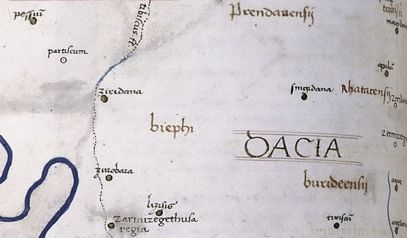
- Zurobara on Dacia's map from a medieval book made after Ptolemy's Geographia (ca. 150 AD)
- Cultures: Biephi
- Location: Romania

Zurobara (Ancient Greek: Ζουρόβαρα) was a Dacian town located in the northwest of today's Romanian Banat. It was positioned by the Tibiscus (Timiș) river, north of Sarmizegetusa Regia and south of Ziridava.

This town was attested by Ptolemy in his Geographia (3.8), yet its exact location remains unknown. Zurobara is among the places that are not to be found on the great Roman roads between the Tysis (Tisza) and the Alouta (Olt).

== Location ==
For a long time, it was assumed that Zurobara (also found under the corrupted and inaccurate form Zambara) was located on the site of the Timișoara Fortress, but this was refuted by modern historians. This hypothesis has its origin in a manuscript by the Venetian Domenico Mario Negri, edited and published in Basel by Wolfgang Wissenburg in 1557. In 1829, Friedrich Heinrich Theodor Bischoff and Johann Heinrich Möller erroneously identified Zurobara with Sombor from today's Vojvodina. More recent calculations overlap Zurobara with the Dacian fortress of Unip, discovered in 2007 25 km from Timișoara.

== Etymology ==
The name Zurobara (a possible alternate spelling for Zuropara) was interpreted initially as "strong city": the ending bara/vara means "city" (the same as Thracian para) and the first part Zuro means "strong". Zuro is also found in the name of Zyraxes, a Dacian king.

In a second line of interpretation, because of Proto-Indo-European *e > Dacian "a" (cf. PIE *dhewa > Dacian "dava", PIE *ser > Dacian "sara"), "bara" is rather derived from root *bher "rich, abundance" and "zura" from root *ser, *sara "waters, river". In this case, Zurobara meant "a water abundant city". Indeed, modern renderings show that Zurobara was located in a swampy area surrounded by the Timiș river. Historian Aurel Berinde proposes a Sanskrit origin of the term in the form of surabhara, formed by the combination of the words sura- "shine, serenity, sun" and -bhara "to carry", with the approximate translation "bearer of serenity".

== Ancient sources ==
=== Ptolemy's Geographia ===
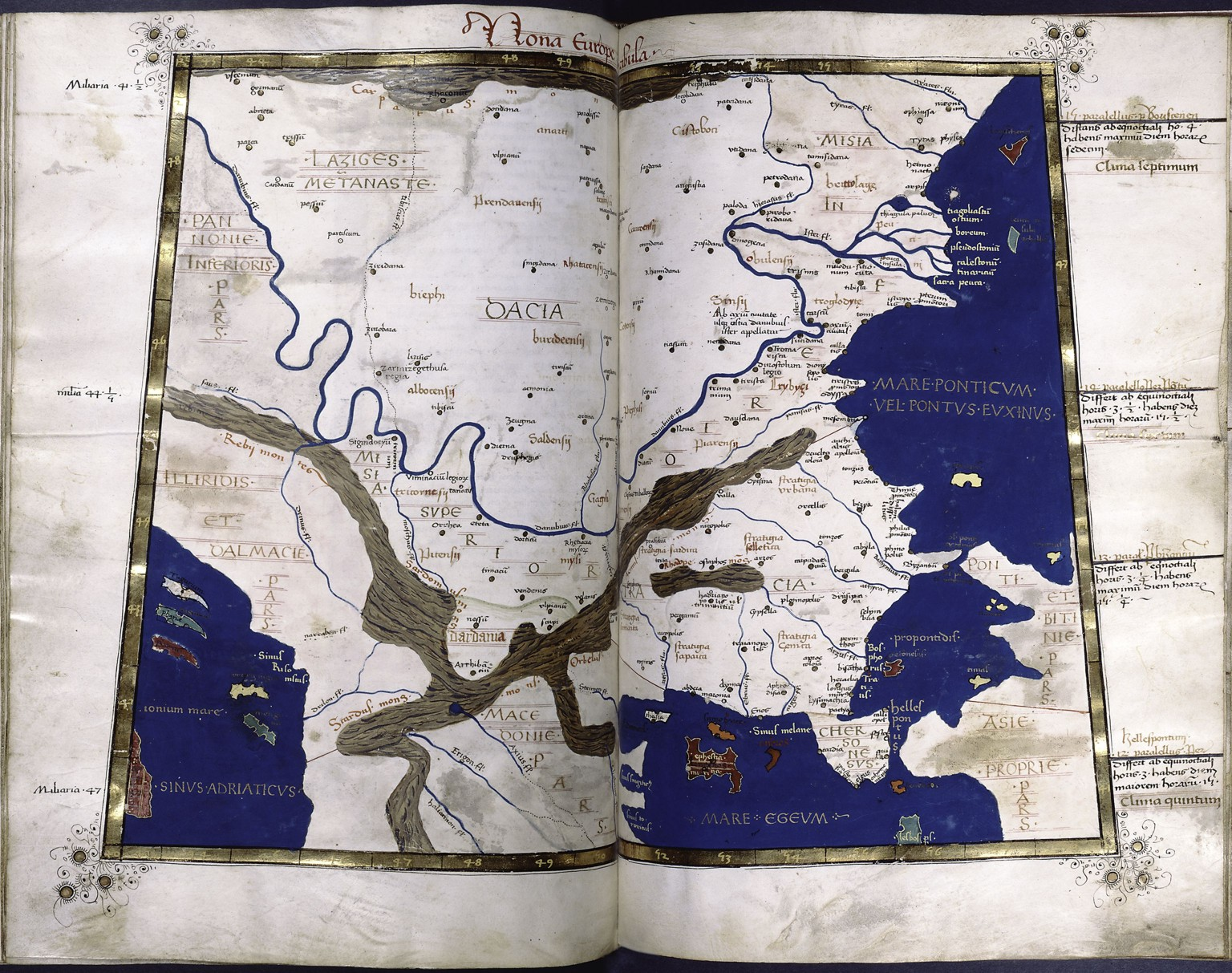
Dacia's map from a medieval book made after Ptolemy's Geographia (ca. 150 AD). Zurobara is on the northwest.

Zurobara is mentioned in Ptolemy's Geographia (c. 150 AD) in the form Ζουρόβαρα as an important town in western Dacia, at latitude 45° 40' N and longitude 45° 40' E (note that he used a different meridian and some of his calculations were off). Ptolemy completed his work soon after Trajan's Dacian Wars, as a result of which parts of Dacia were incorporated into the Roman Empire as the new Dacia province.

=== Tabula Peutingeriana ===
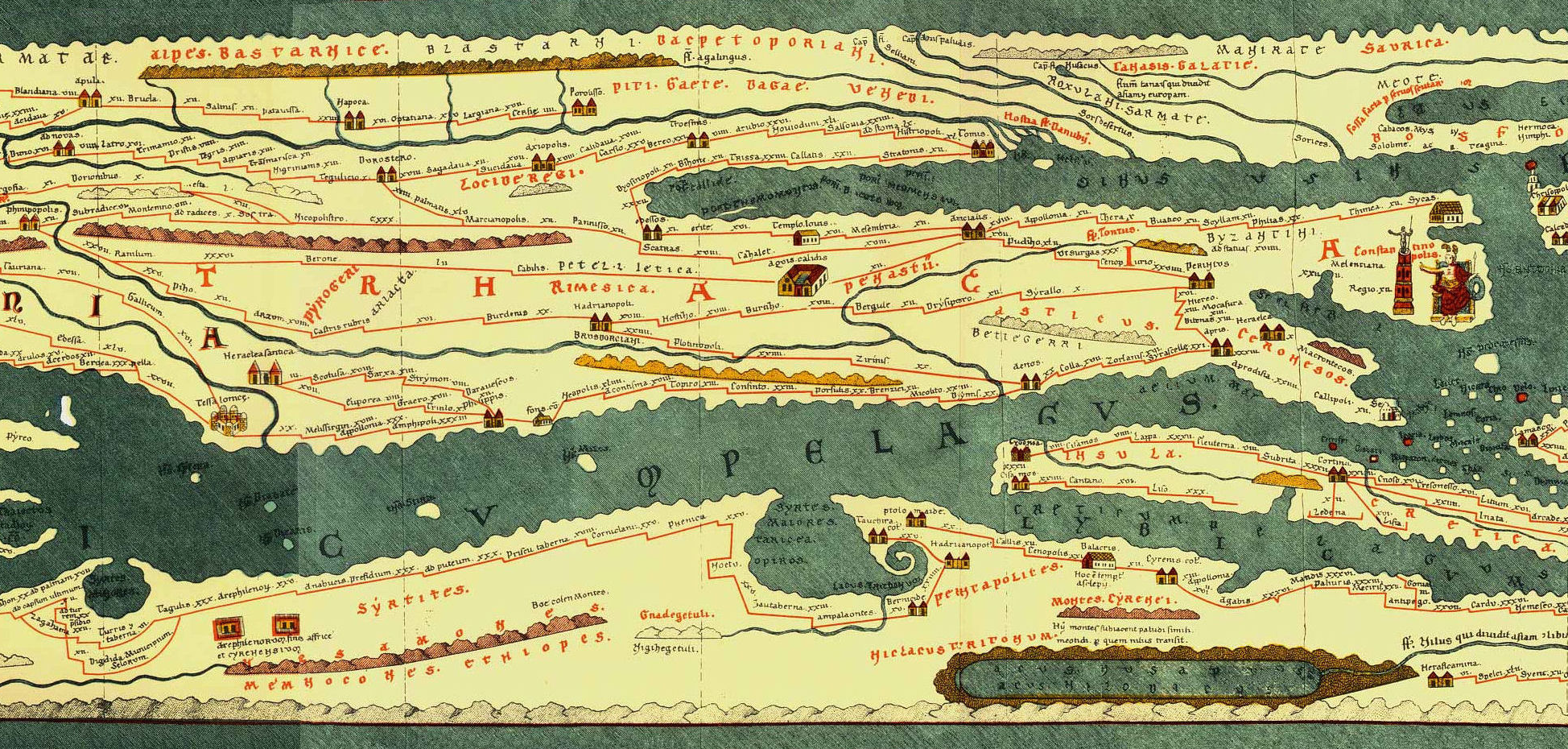
Dacia on Tabula Peutingeriana

Unlike many other Dacian towns mentioned by Ptolemy, Zurobara is missing from Tabula Peutingeriana (1st–4th centuries AD), an itinerarium showing the cursus publicus, the road network in the Roman Empire.

The Danish philologist and historian Gudmund Schütte believed that the town with similar name Ziridava, also mentioned by Ptolemy and also missing from Tabula Peutingeriana, was the same with Zurobara. This idea is deemed erroneous alongside many other assumed duplications of names by the Romanian historian and archeologist Vasile Pârvan in his work Getica. Pârvan reviewed all localities mentioned in Ptolemy's Geographia, analyzing and verifying all data available to him at the time. He points out that Ziri and Zuro (meaning "water") are the roots of two different Geto-Dacian words. Additionally, Ptolemy provided different coordinates for the two towns; some medieval maps created based on his Geographia depict two distinct towns.

== See also ==
- Dacian davae
- List of ancient cities in Thrace and Dacia
- Dacia
- Roman Dacia
