= Ziridava =

Dacian fortified settlement

- Ziridaua
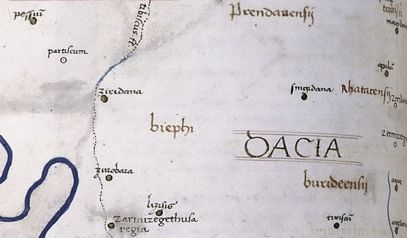
- Ziridava on Dacia's map from a medieval book made after Ptolemy's Geographia. It is positioned by the Tibiscus river (Timiș River), north of Zurobara and south-east of Porolissum.
- Cultures: Biephi
- Location: Romania

Ziridava (Ziridaua, Ancient Greek: Ζιρίδαυα) was a Dacian town located between Apulon and Tibiscum, mentioned by Ptolemy in the area of the Dacian tribe of Biephi (today's Romania, Banat region).

== Ancient sources ==
=== Ptolemy's Geographia ===
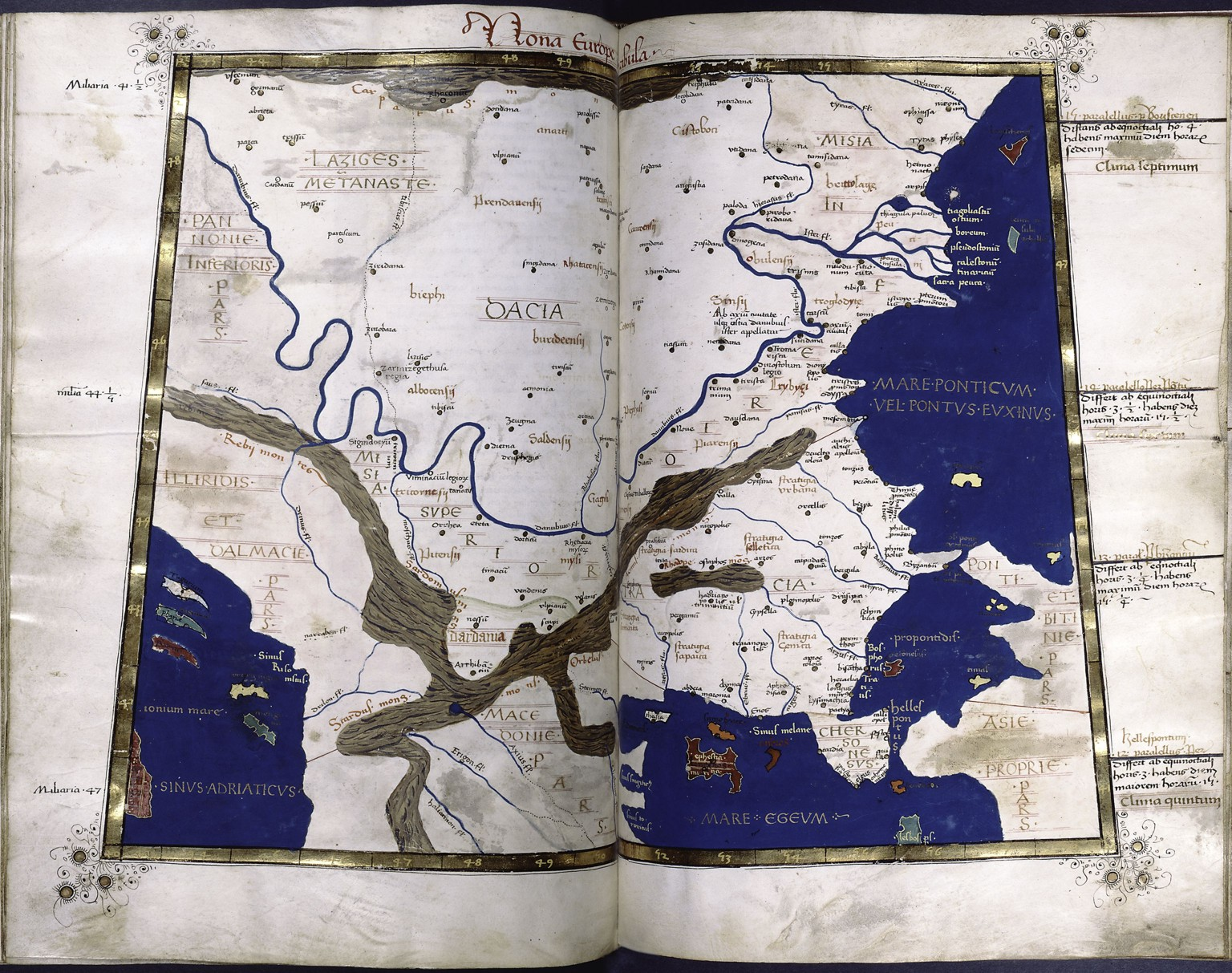
Dacia's map from a medieval book made after Ptolemy's Geographia (c. 140). Ziridava is on the north west.

Ziridava is mentioned in Ptolemy's Geographia (c. 140) in the form Ziridaua (Ancient Greek: Ζιρίδαυα) as an important town in western Dacia, at latitude 48° N and longitude 46° 30' E (he used a different meridian and some of his calculations were off). Ptolemy completed his work soon after Trajan's Dacian Wars, as a result of which parts of Dacia were incorporated into the Roman Empire as the new Dacia province. However, he based his work on older sources like Marinus of Tyre, as Ziridava is believed to have been destroyed during the war.

=== Tabula Peutingeriana ===
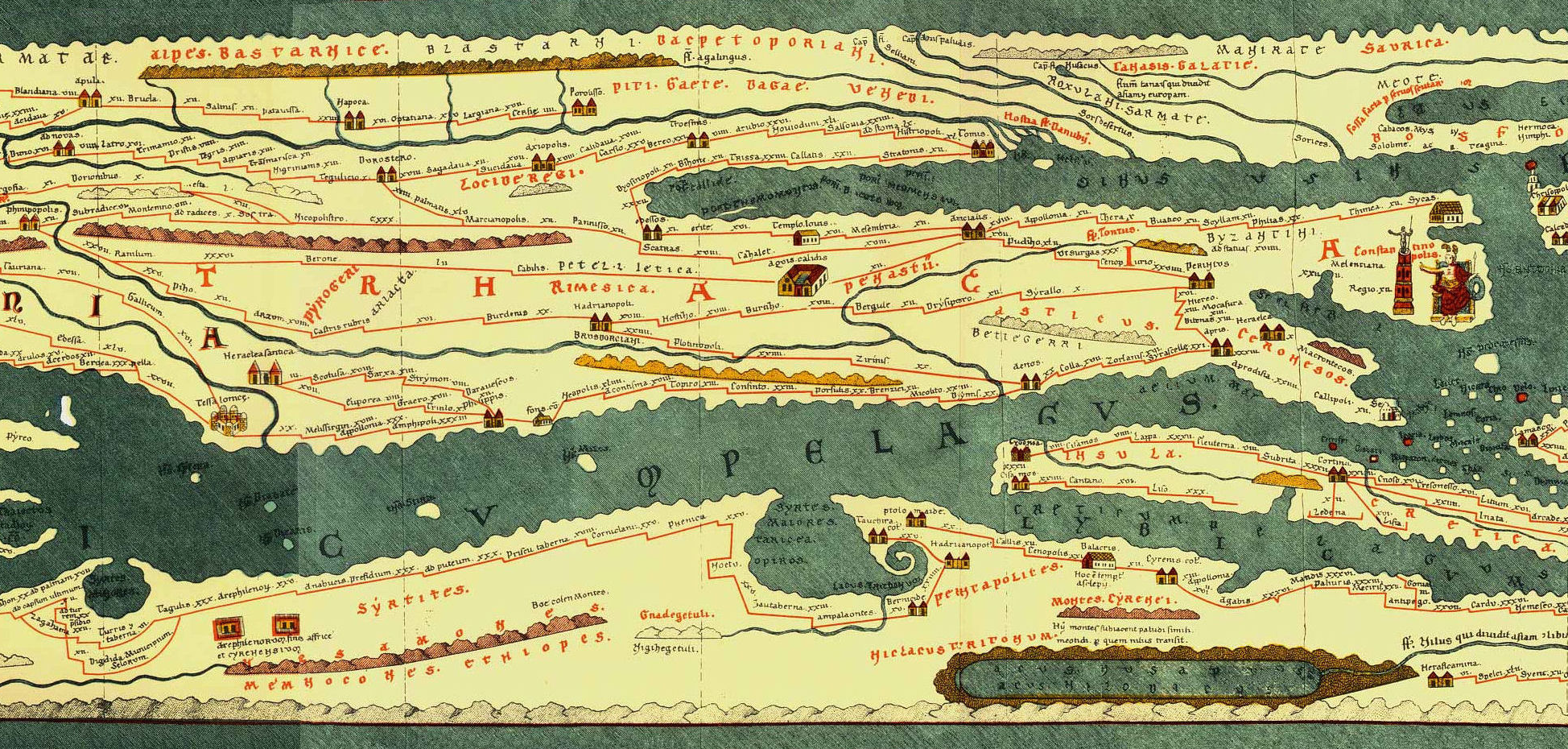
Dacia on Tabula Peutingeriana

Unlike other Dacian towns mentioned by Ptolemy, Ziridava is missing from Tabula Peutingeriana (1st–4th centuries), an itinerarium showing the cursus publicus, the road network in the Roman Empire.

This prompted the Danish philologist and historian Gudmund Schütte to assume that Ziridava and Zurobara are one and the same. This idea is deemed erroneous alongside a number of other assumed duplications of names, by the Romanian historian and archaeologist Vasile Pârvan in his work Getica. Pârvan reviewed all localities mentioned in Ptolemy's Geographia, analyzing and verifying all data available to him at the time. He points out that Ziri and Zuro (meaning water) are the roots of two different Geto-Dacian words. Additionally, Ptolemy provided different coordinates for the two towns, some medieval maps created based on his Geographia depict two distinct towns.

== Etymology ==
In the Dacian (North Thracian) language dava means city, town, fortress.

Vasile Pârvan considers that the form Ziri- is the same with a form Giri- (cf. Zermi and Germi). Ziri- corresponds to the Proto-Indo-European root ǵʰel- 'to shine, gold' so that Ziridava means "The gold fortress".

== Location ==
Since no inscription have been found to date, Ziridava is hypothetically located at one of the following sites in Banat (western Romania):

- Cenad, Timiș County
- Pecica, Arad County (most likely)
- Cladova, Arad County
- Zărand, Arad County
- Arad

=== Cenad ===
Based on his analysis of Ptolemy's Geographia and previously recorded data, Vasile Pârvan points out that Ptolemy had placed Ziridava in the extreme west of Dacia, near the middle Tisa River and identifies it, hypothetically, with the modern city of Cenad (Timiș), situated on the left bank of the Mureș, where Roman relics were found.

In 1868, in the middle of the old Cenad village, while digging the foundations of the new church, a variety of Roman objects were found, including bricks, a number of them stamped with Legio XIII Gemina (CIL, III, 1629, 1018, 8065), a sarcophagus fragment, a fragmentary stone inscription (CIL, III, 6272) and a denarius of Faustina. Later on, during various civil works, other Roman archaeological materials were discovered: weights, tiles, coins of the emperors Claudius Gothicus, Aurelian, Marcus Aurelius Probus and Constantius II, ceramic fragments, capitals of columns, brooches, etc. Until now no systematic excavations have been made within the village however. Based on material discovered accidentally at Cenadul Mare (Big Cenad), it is assumed that a Roman castra existed there, probably having the mission to supervise the transport on Mureş River. By contrast with the abundant Roman archaeological material, until date only a few Dacian pottery fragments were discovered accidentally and there is no information about the exact location of the findings. The fragments are preserved in the Museum of Banat in Timișoara.

=== Pecica ===
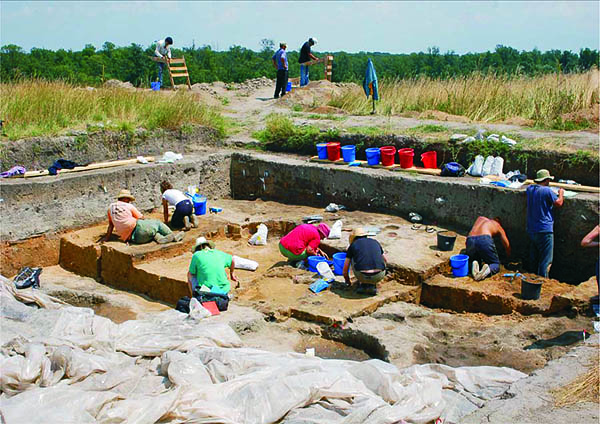
Archaeological site Şanţul Mare, Pecica, Romania, 2008

A Geto-Dacian walled city dating to Burebista's reign (82–44 BC) has been discovered at the archaeological site called 'Şanţul Mare ("Big Ditch"), 7 km from Pecica.

Archaeologist Ion Horaţiu Crişan was very involved with the research at Pecica and placed Ziridava at this location with a high degree of certainty. He wrote the book Ziridava – The Digs from "Șanțul Mare" From 1960, 1961, 1962, 1964, focused on the archaeological digs performed in the 1960s at this ancient city.

The site is a long-lived tell settlement of the Bronze Age. At least 16 archaeological horizons have been distinguished, starting with the Neolithic and ending with the Feudal Age (since the 12th century a cemetery existed in this place) and with one of the clearest sequence of pottery development in Banat. A large collection of stone molds for metallurgy was found, along with inhumation cemeteries containing rich grave goods of gold, bronze and faience and amber beads. The most important layers belong to the Bronze Age Pecica culture and the Dacian times.

Șanțul Mare is a mound located on the right bank of Mureş river, with an oval shape measuring 120 by 60–70 m. The long axis of the mound has a north-east-west orientation, being parallel with the course of the river. The mound is part of a fluvial terrace, which was separated by a huge moat surrounding it on all sides, with the exception of the east-south-east side. There, a steep slope is separating it from the terrace through which the Mureş flows today. Because of this unique location, the mound is heavily fortified, but it is not yet known whether it was naturally separated from the rest of the terrace by an older arm of the river or this type of fortification was done by people, artificially.

==== History of archaeological site ====
The earliest research at Şanţul Mare was done in 1870 by Iosif Hampel and Floris Romer from National Antiquities Museum, Budapest and proved the extraordinary importance of the tell. The amateur archaeologist Ladislau Dömötör, a painting professor at a high school in Arad, continued with digs in 1898–1900, 1901 and 1902, and the majority of known Dacian artifacts, until new excavations started in the 1960s, came from these efforts. The findings were numerous and significant, however the research was poorly documented and most of these materials have remained unpublished. The artifacts are kept at the Arad Museum Complex.

In 1910 a new campaign was started by the Cluj-based archaeologist Martin Roska, a pioneer of scientific archeology and the first that helped to clarify the chronological and cultural classification of the various horizons captured here. The excavations of 1910–1911, 1923 and 1924 identified a substantial dwelling of Middle Bronze Age with 16 horizons, the Mureş culture (originally called Periam-Pecica culture). The reports reviewed mostly Bronze Age strata, but also that of the Middle Copper Age.

Dorin Popescu also probed the site in 1943, and after validating the chronological horizons identified by Roska, he drew attention to some remains of La Tène Period and Migration Period.

Despite multiple Dacian material findings, all previous campaigns focused on the Bronze Age. That, and the fact that previous research was amateurish or poorly documented, triggered new major excavations in the 1960s under the leadership of archaeologist Ion Horaţiu Crişan, together with Egon Dörner. The new excavations at Pecica have proved the existence on the fortified plateau of a large Dacian settlement with two different habitation horizons, as well as of a cemetery from 11th–13th century. The institutions that participated between 1960 and 1964 in research included the Institute of History and Archaeology, Cluj-Napoca, Arad Museum, Babeş-Bolyai University and the Institute of Medicine and Pharmacy, Cluj-Napoca.

Since 2005 the investigations were resumed at the site after a significant grant was obtained from the National Science Foundation (USA), following a project by Arad Museum Complex in partnership with Museum of Banat and University of Michigan. The research objectives included deepening the dig to the sterile areas excavated in the previous campaign and further site study. A detailed topographic map of the tell neighborhoods has also been created. The team included: George Pascu Hurezan – Scientific Lead (Arad Museum Complex), Florin Drașovean, Alexandru Szentmiklosi (Museum of Banat), John M. O'Shea, Sarah Sherwood (University of Michigan), Alex W. Barker (University of Missouri).

In 2008, deepening continued within the same area (10 x 10 m) and the Middle Bronze Age layer was reached, the goal being the identification of residential structures from that horizon.

==== Findings ====
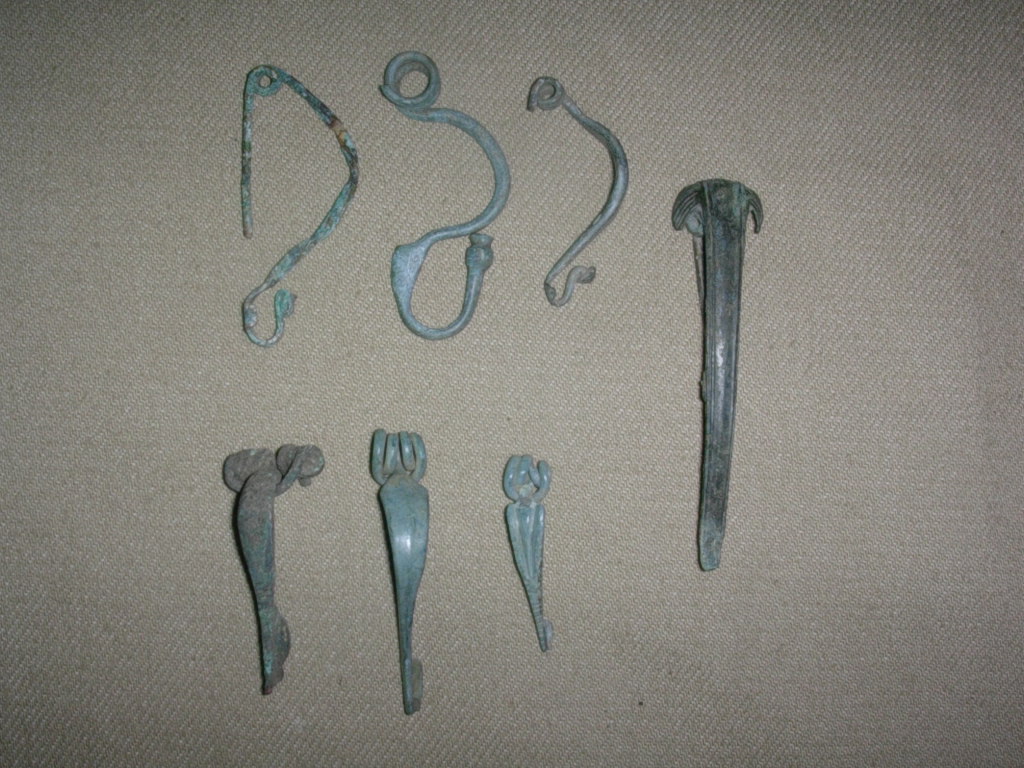
La Tène, Thraco-Getic and Nauheim Fibulae.

The older Dacian horizon, identified in the 1960s and named by Crișan Dacian I, was roughly dated between 2nd and 1st centuries BC, but the evidence is scarce. Findings include a polished black fruit bowl worked by the hand, of a type missing from the recent layer, a bowl in Hallstatt style and a fragment of fibula belonging to a variant of Nauheim type. A significant amount of grey pottery worked on the wheel and similar with that in newer layer was also discovered, which hints to the fact that this layer cannot be much older than the recent one. There doesn't appear to be an interruption in the habitation between the two layers and it is likely that the settlement has been destroyed by an attack and then rebuilt.

The last and most recent Dacian horizon, Dacian II, is assumed to have existed between the 1st century BC and 2nd century AD. The evidence supporting this includes a variety of pottery and coins. In this layer, there were discovered two Roman Republican silver denarii, one issued in 46–45 BC and the other in 43 BC. A silver denarius of Emperor Trajan (c. 106 AD) was also discovered in the autumn of 1961.

The pottery discovered in this horizon is of fine, gray type, worked predominantly with the wheel. It has the appearance of La Tène III period ceramics, dated 1st century BC – 1st century AD. The imported Roman pottery appears to be completely missing, which might imply that this settlement has not lasted too long in our era. Another discovery in this horizon includes a large red pot, worked at the wheel, with lips in steps, and which has perfect analogues in the ceramics from Sarmizegetusa (Grădiştea Muncelului), already dated between the 1st century BC and 1st century AD.

On the plateau within the fortifications have been discovered several rectangular buildings, one of them with a round apse. The walls were made of wooden stakes barraged with rods and stitched together with clay. The buildings were covered with reeds and other types of straws. The floor was made of yellow clay, well pressed. The buildings were close to each other, sometimes the distance between them being only 1 m.

In the summer of 1962 there have been several surveys to verify the surrounding plain, in the vicinity of the mound, outside the ditch. These surveys have shown that the Dacian settlement was not limited to the plateau surrounded by the ditch, but it was spread out in the open field nearby. The plateau was the only fortified point of the settlement, while by contrast, the outside dwellings were mud huts partially carved into the earth, and having a poor inventory of objects. This is a sure proof of the existence of social stratification, with the wealthy (tarabostes) staying on the hillock, while the hovels of the free men (comati) lay in the surrounding areas.

In one of the buildings were uncovered crucibles for molten liquid metal, clay molds, an anvil of iron, small bronze chisels, several small objects like fibulae, metal ornaments, buckles, mirrors, buttons, etc. Based on these objects, it is assumed that the building belonged to a craftsman involved with the manufacturing of small items, most likely a jeweler.

Another important discovery was a small round sanctuary with the diameter of 7 m. The sanctuary is composed of a central hearth, perhaps used for offerings, surrounded by thick but not very deep pillars, made of wood. Particularly interesting is the succession of pillars, namely six round pillars followed by a larger rectangular pillar, which closely resembles the large round sanctuary on the terrace of Sarmizegetusa, which was serving as a sanctuary-calendar.

A Dacian workshop has been discovered with equipment for minting coins along with evidence of bronze, silver, and iron working that suggests a broad-spectrum of metal-smithing. Anvils in the shape of massive truncated pyramids were found in the workshop with heights between 0.14 and 0.15 m and weights between 6.85 and 7.65 kg.

The excavations in 2005 have identified the Dacian and Late Bronze Age layers, and recovered charred remains of grains, animal bones and parts from a metal workshop.

During the excavations, multiple storage pits for grains were found both on plateau and outside it, a number of them showing a high quality work. This indicates that the main occupation of the inhabitants during the Dacian period was agriculture. The animal bones discovered show that another important activity was raising cattle and in a lesser extent, hunting. Trades are also well represented as the discovered workshops proves.The settlement was also an economic center characterized by commodity production, evidenced by the well equipped jewelry workshop. The presence of domestic and foreign merchants is attested by multiple import items.

All evidence indicates that the large Dacian settlement at Pecica, was most likely the center of a tribe or of a tribal union, integrated into the Dacian state. The fortified center flourished during the age of the Dacian state (1st century BC – 1st century AD). The settlement size and development level sets it aside as a Dacian oppida, similar to Piroboridava (Poiana) and Argedava (Popeşti).

It is believed that during Trajan's 101–106 AD Dacian Wars, the settlement was destroyed, although it is located outside the newly incorporated Dacia province. Being situated however, by the Mureş River, near the newly created Roman border, it is likely to have been destroyed by them. In any case it is certain that it ended by a violent fire whose traces are visible everywhere and it never been inhabited after the 2nd century AD. It is likely that because of this, unlike other towns with Dacian names, this settlement is no longer mentioned by the Roman itineraries like Tabula Peutingeriana.

However Dacian and Sarmatian communities continued to live in the region, being strictly surveilled by the Romans. During the Migration Period (3rd–10th century) the territory between the Tisa, Crişul Alb and Mureş was successively dominated by Sarmatians, Goths, Huns, Gepidae, Avars and Slavs.

During medieval times (11th–13th century) the location of the settlement was used as a cemetery promontory, as shown by the multitude of graves and human skeletons discovered in a younger layer, during most archaeological campaigns.

The Department of Archaeology at the Arad Museum Complex has a wide range of artifacts from the Dacian settlements and fortifications from the lower Mureş and Crişul Alb valleys, including Pecica. At least 3,000 artifacts from all periods are coming from the archaeological discoveries at Şanţul Mare.

=== Cladova ===
On the other hand, at Cladova, Arad County a number of Roman stamped bricks were found in the place where it is believed that it was Ziridava.

Archaeologist George Pascu Hurezan noted that at Cladova was also discovered a new sealing ring.

=== Zărand ===
Another hypothesis suggests that Ziridava was located at Zărand, Arad County, by the bay of Crişul Alb River.

=== Arad ===
It is also believed that Ziridava fortress is located in Arad, Romania.

== See also ==
- Dacian davae
- List of ancient cities in Thrace and Dacia
- Dacia
- Roman Dacia
- Bronze Age in Romania
