= Arad Museum Complex =

History and archaeology museum in Arad, Romania

The Arad Museum Complex (Romanian: 'Complexul Muzeal Arad') is primarily a history and archaeology museum in the city of Arad, Romania.

The museum presents archaeological items from the Iron Age, the Dacian Period, the Migration Period and the Early Medieval Period. It also showcases historical items relating to the Revolution of 1848 in Transylvania and the Union of Transylvania with Romania in 1918, ethnographical items, natural science exhibits relating to the Arad area, minerals, flora and fauna specimens, classical and contemporary Romanian art, European paintings from the 17th - 20th centuries, decorative art items and exhibits relating to the history of theater: programmes, posters, photographs, scores (the Iosif Sârbuț collection).

The museum building is the Culture Palace, a monument of architecture from 1913, by the architect Ludovic Szantay. The museum owns items listed in the Romanian National Cultural Heritage Treasure.

== History ==
The Arad Museum Complex was opened in 1893, as an exhibition of Relics of the Revolution from 1848, in the lobby from the 2nd floor of the local State Theatre. Two decades later, in 1913, the museum has been moved into the new built Culture Palace, along with the philharmonic and town library. Besides the old relics exhibition, archeological and medieval history collections were put on display and a European art gallery has been opened as well. In the inter-war period these have been completed with an ethnography exhibition and two memorial rooms dedicated to the local politicians Vasile Goldis and Stefan Cicio-Pop (1934).

After the communist overtake, the collections and the exhibitions have been reorganized in the spirit of the new ideology, the section of ancient history, the "Museum of the Revolution from 1848" and the art gallery being re-opened in 1954–55 and the ethnography exhibition in 1956.

In the period 1958–1988 several sections of the museum have been opened in the county: Lipova (Town Museum – 1958), Siria (I. Slavici and E. Montia Memorial Museum – 1960), Savârsin (Art and Ethnography Museum – 1988) and Minis (Vineyard and Vine Museum – 1988). After a radical reorganisation, which took more than two years, the archaeology and history exhibitions have been reopened in 1979, within the Cultural Palace. The Art Gallery has been moved into its current premises in 1984.

As a consequence of the political changes from December 1989, the basic exhibitions have been liberated of ideological ballast and in 1992 the a section of natural sciences has been opened, a year later the one of inter-war history as well. The Art Gallery, entirely reorganized, re-opened in 1998. The exhibition "Arad – December 1989", came into public circuit in December 2004.

Since 1967, the museum issues its own scientific publication called Ziridava, named after the nearby Dacian settlement mentioned by Ptolemy and archaeologically identified at Pecica. New scientific reviews are being edited since 1992: Studies and Communications of Art and Architecture, Natural Harmonies (1995) – researches from the field of natural sciences – and Zarandul (1999), containing ethnographic studies. The multimedia workshop Kinema Ikon, part of the museum since 1990, issues the interdisciplinary review Intermedia since 1994, being one of Romania’s leading hypermedia art instances, a base on which the workshop represented the country at the 50th Biennial of Contemporary Art in Venice (2003).

Today, the museum manages a collection of over 125.000 pieces, being an active actor on the Arad cultural scene, assuming a reformative role.

== See also ==
- Ziridava
- Romanian archaeology
- Museum of Banat
