= Dacian fortress of Unip =

Dacian fortified town in Romania

- Location within Romania
- 45.663°N 21.306°E
- Cultures: Hallstatt, La Tène
- Location: Dealu Cetățuica, Unip, Timiș, Romania

Site notes
- Area: 4 ha (9.9 acres)
- Excavation dates: 2011, 2015, 2019
- Archaeologists: Liviu Măruia, Dorel Micle
- Discovered: 2007
- Condition: Ruined

Monument istoric
- Reference no.: TM-I-s-B-06089

It was a Dacian fortified town. The site was discovered in 2007 by a team of archeologists led by Liviu Măruia and Dorel Micle. The first excavations were carried out in 2009, and in the following years traces of habitation from the first Iron Age (Hallstatt culture), the Dacian period (1st century BC–1st century AD) and the Slavic migration period (7th century) were discovered here. According to Micle and other local archeologists, the four-hectare site could overlap the ancient polis of Zurobara, mentioned by Ptolemy in his Geographia.
