= Encrusted Pottery culture =

Bronze Age archaeological culture

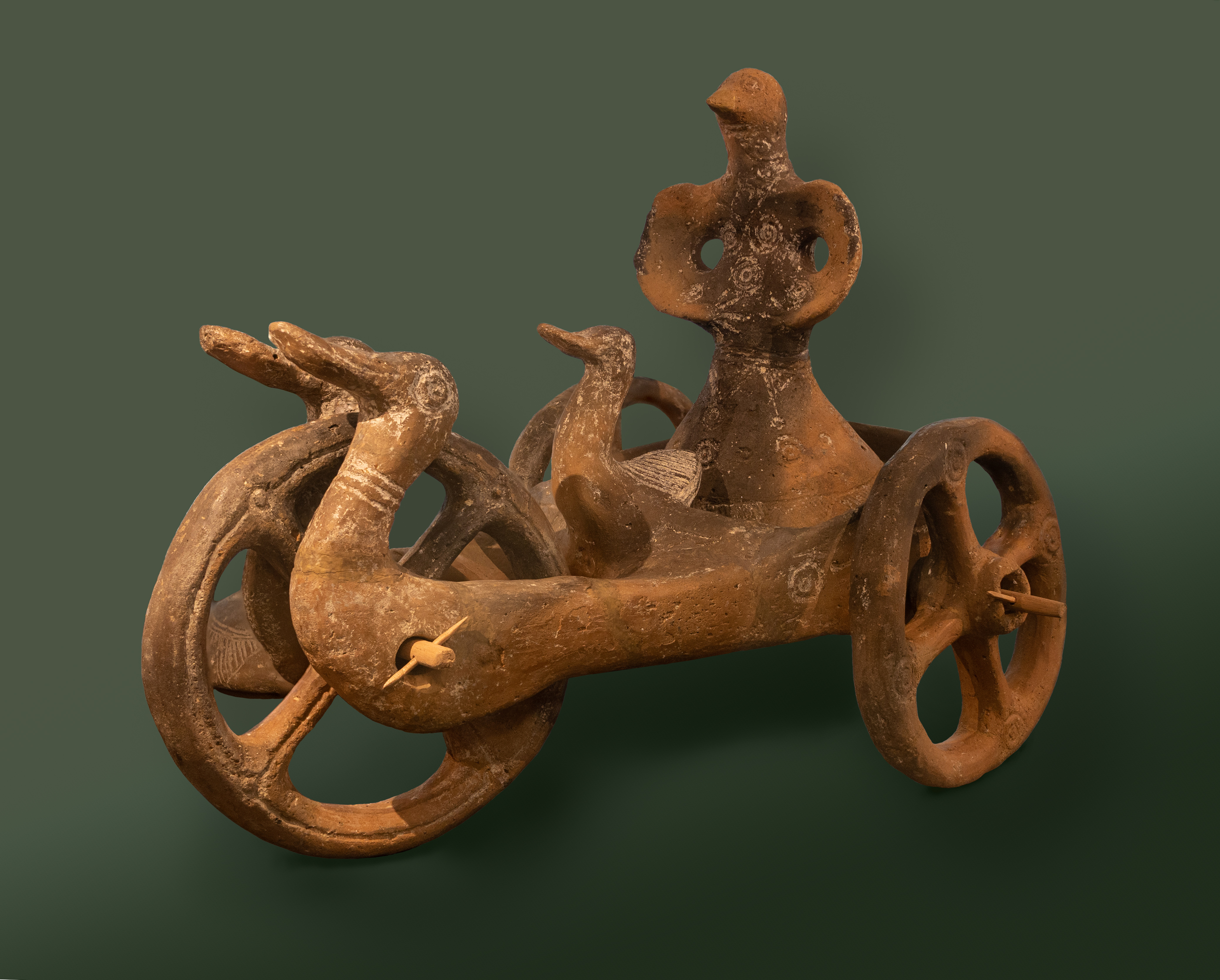
- Geographical range: Hungary, Croatia, Serbia, Romania
- Period: Bronze Age
- Dates: ca. 2000 BC - 14th century BC
- Preceded by: Kisapostag culture, Vucedol culture, Somogyvár-Vinkovci culture, Vatin culture
- Followed by: Tumulus culture, Belegiš culture, Urnfield culture

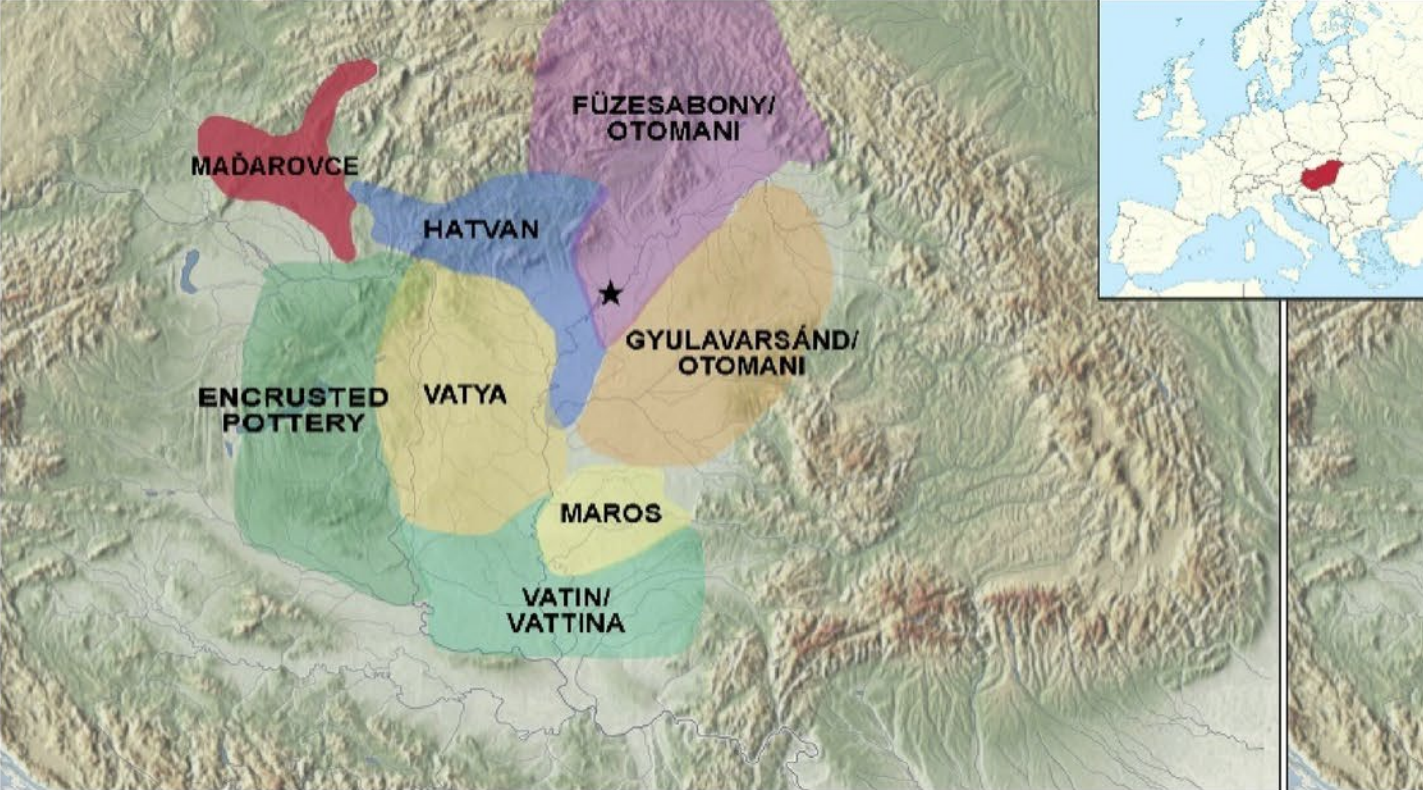
Geographic distribution of Middle Bronze Age cultures in the Carpathian Basin: Ottomány culture, Maros culture, Hatvan culture, Vatya culture, Vatin culture, Mad'arovce culture

The Encrusted Pottery culture was an archaeological culture of the Early to Middle Bronze Age (c. 2000-1400 BC) originating in the Transdanubian region of western Hungary. It emerged from the Kisapostag culture, which was preceded by the Somogyvár-Vinkovci culture. The Encrusted Pottery culture expanded eastwards and southwards along the Danube into parts of Croatia, Serbia, Romania and Bulgaria in response to migrations from the northwest by the Tumulus culture, resulting in the emergence of groups such as Dubovác–Žuto Brdo in Serbia and Gârla Mare–Cârna in Romania, which are considered to be southern manifestations of the Encrusted Pottery culture. The culture was named after its distinctive pottery decorated with incised designs inlaid with white lime, and southern groups are notable for the production of figurines or idols decorated in the same style. Stylistic similarities have also been noted between Encrusted Pottery artefacts and artefacts from Mycenaean Greece.

== Genetic profile ==
Four Y-DNA testings from the Balatonkeresztúr mass grave burial dated to the Encrusted Pottery Culture can be assigned to I2a-M223>>L1229 which is I2a2a1b (group I2a-M223 was present in Megalithic cultures from the British Isles to today's Czechia), while two males' Y-DNA could be assigned to the R1b-Z2103 clade, which appears in contemporaneous populations such as in Bell Beaker period samples from Hungary or a Vucedol culture associated individual from Croatia (in whichever case the most ancient samples come from the Pontic steppes). The ancestry composition of the eight individuals buried was ~29% hunter-gatherer, ~46% European farmer, ~25% western steppe herder. Some individuals had up to ~47% Mesolithic hunter-gatherer ancestry, despite this component being thought to be highly diluted by the time of the Early Bronze Age.

== Gallery ==
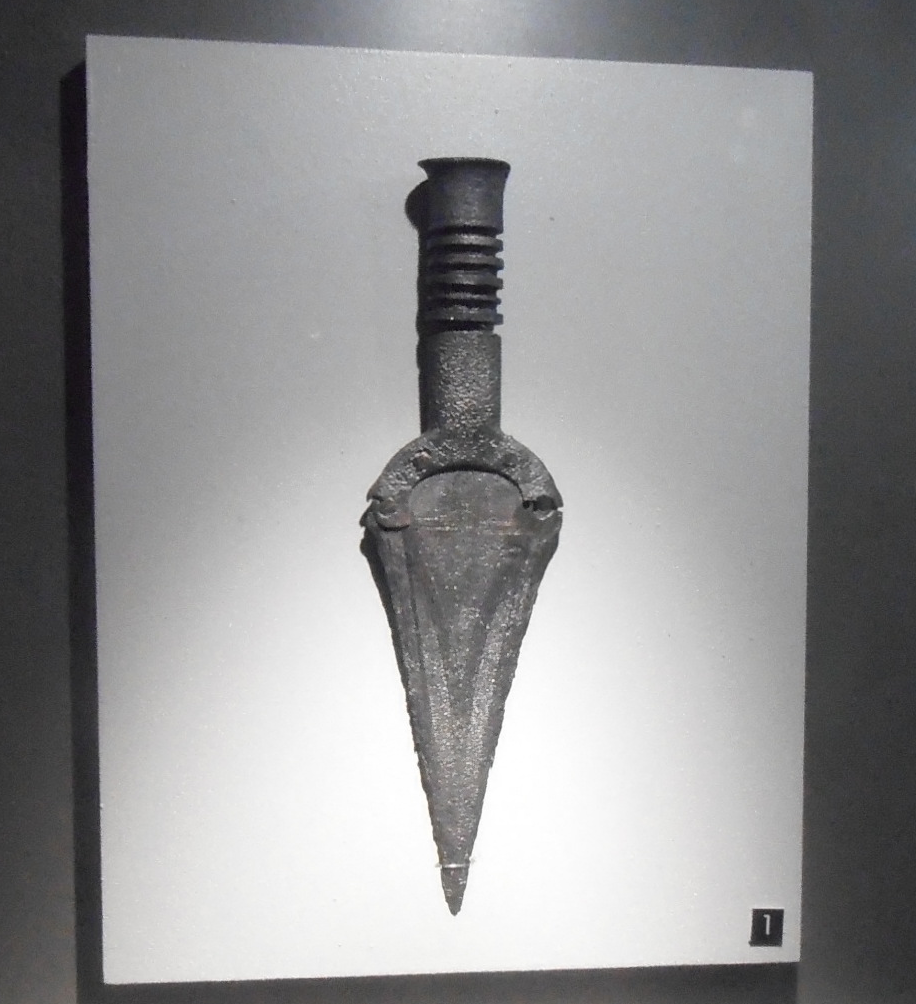
Bronze dagger, Hungary, c. 1800 BC

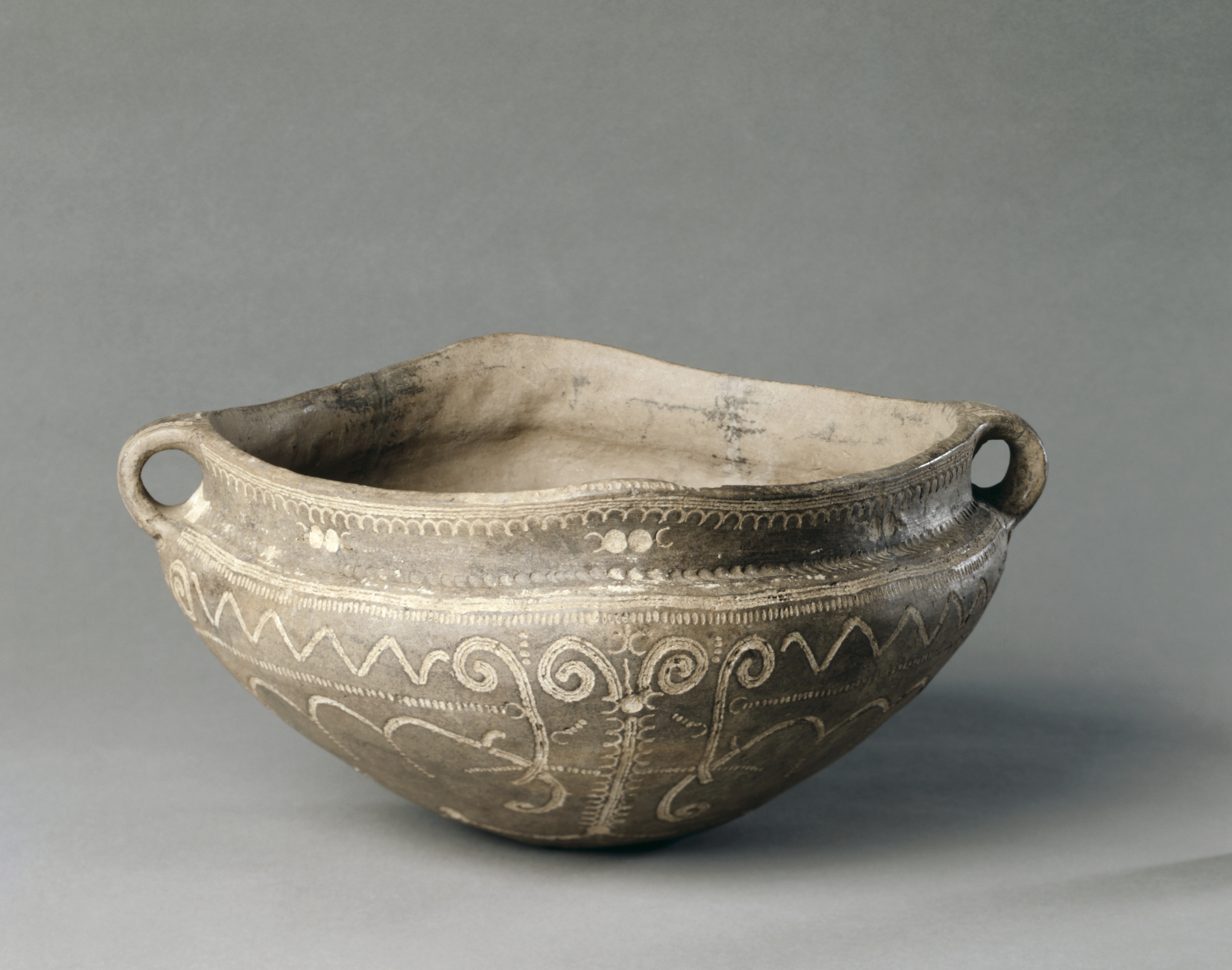
Large ceramic bowl, Romania

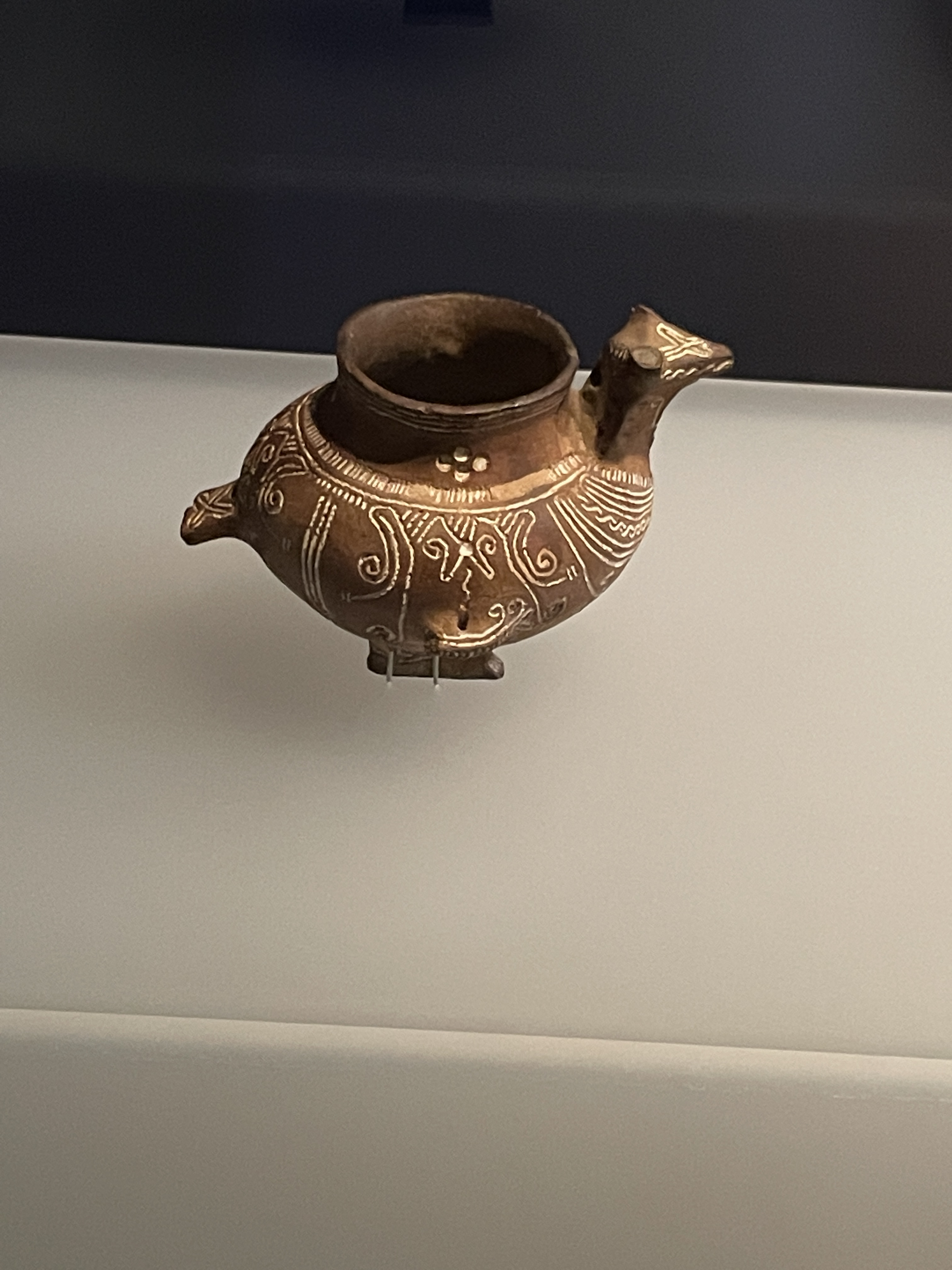
Bird-shaped ceramic vessel

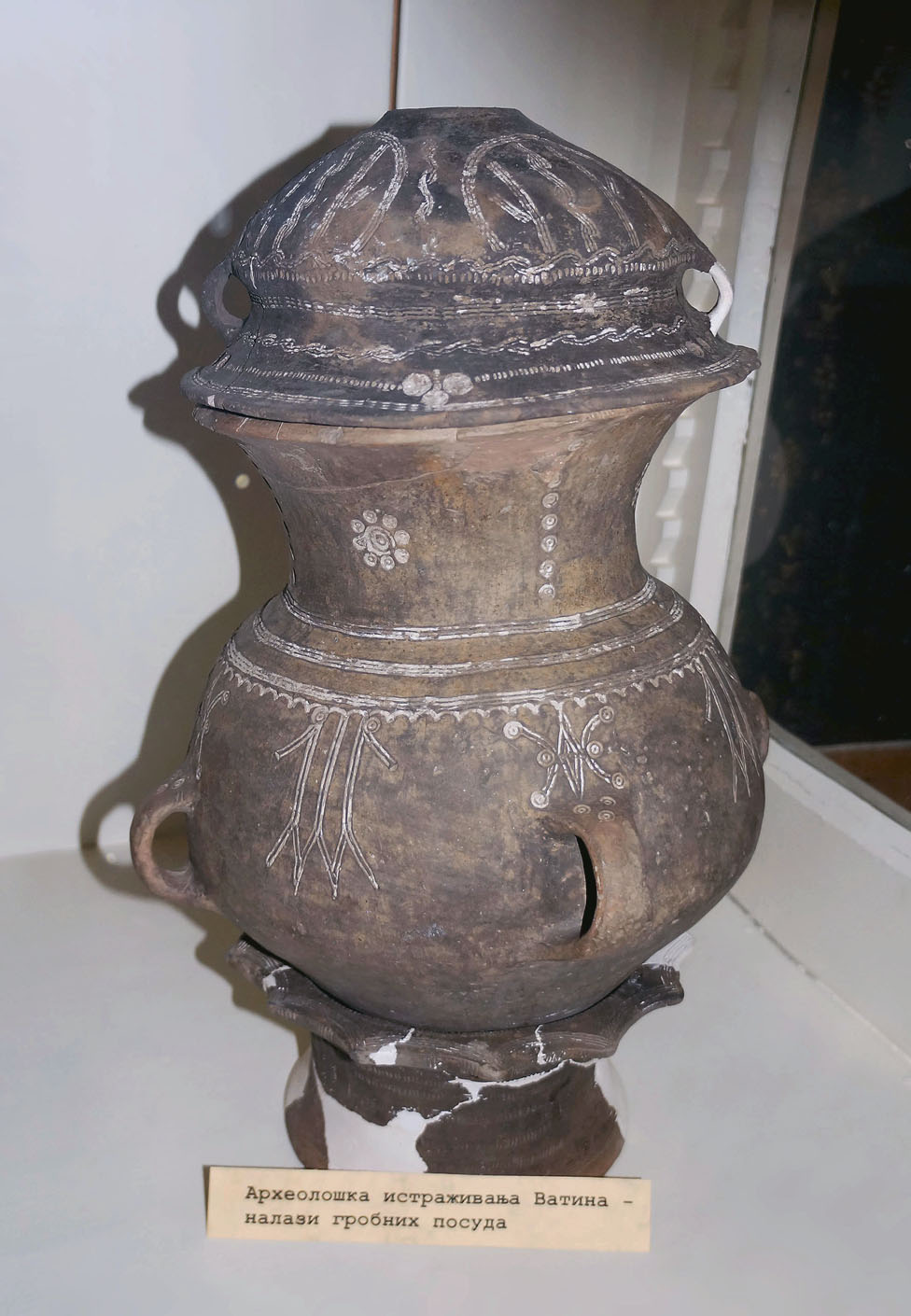
Pottery, Serbia

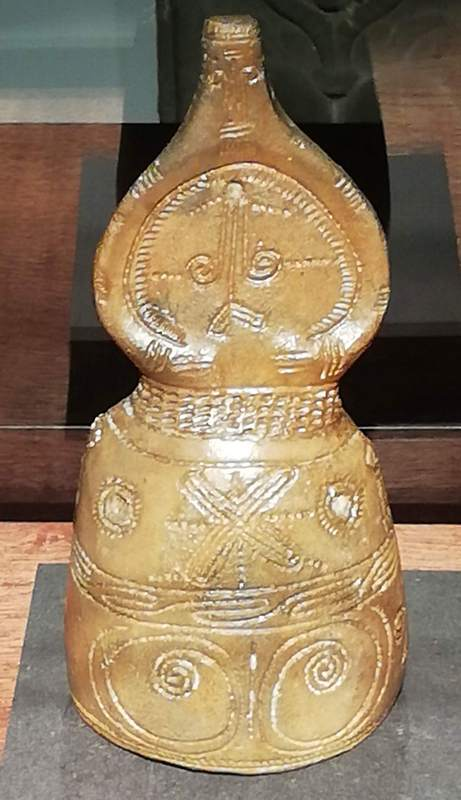
Ceramic figurine or idol, Romania

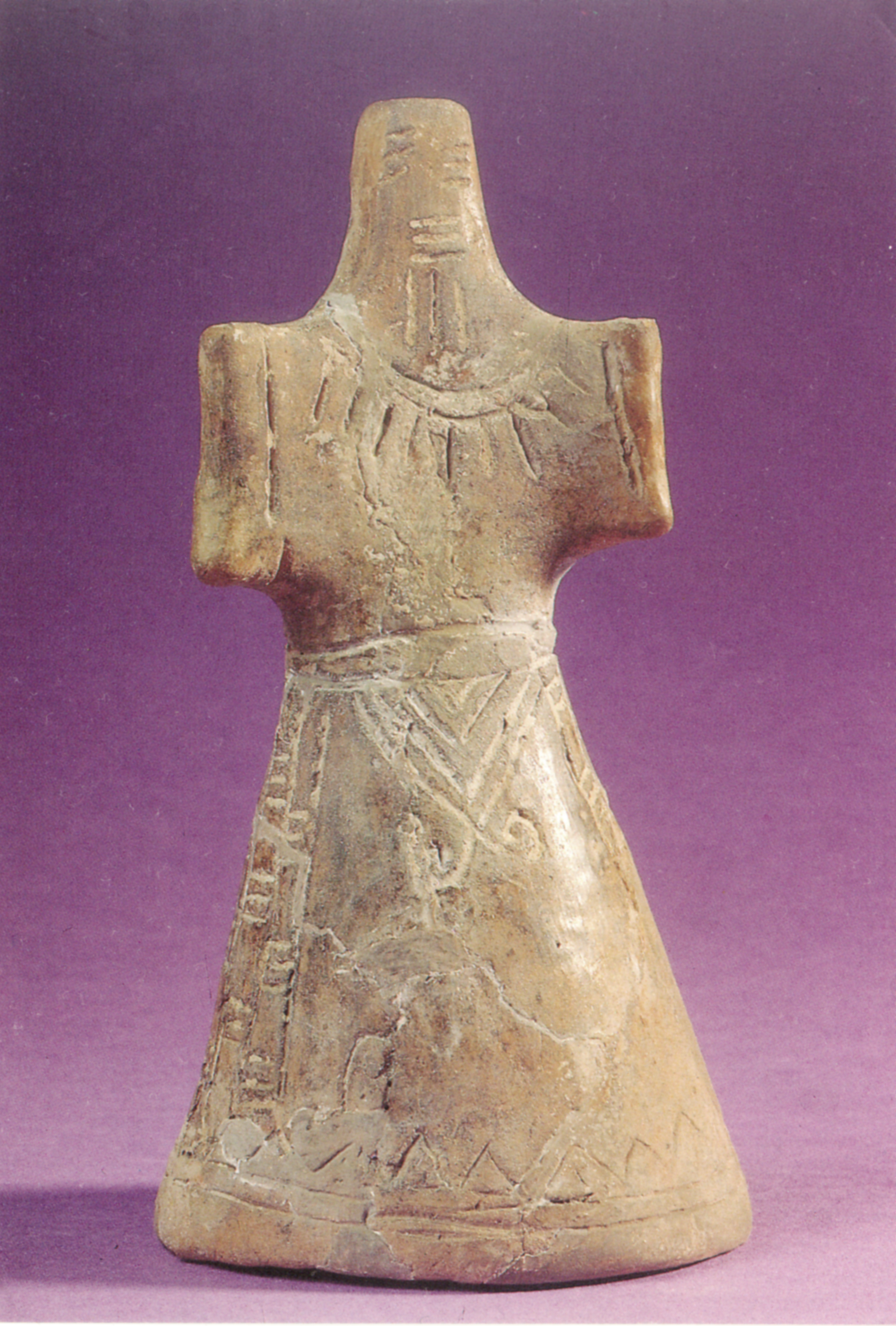
Figurine from Stubarlija, Serbia

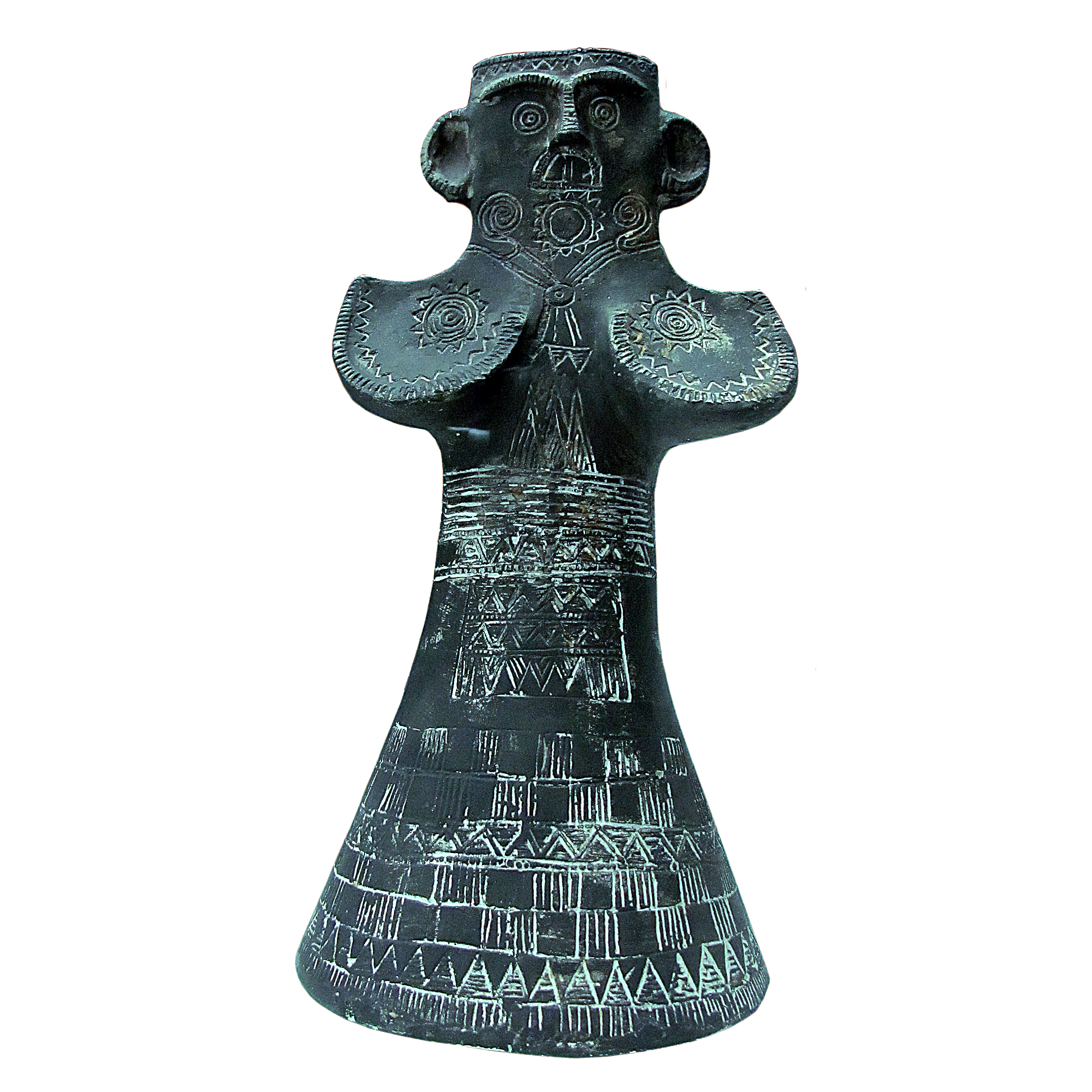
Kličevac Idol, Serbia

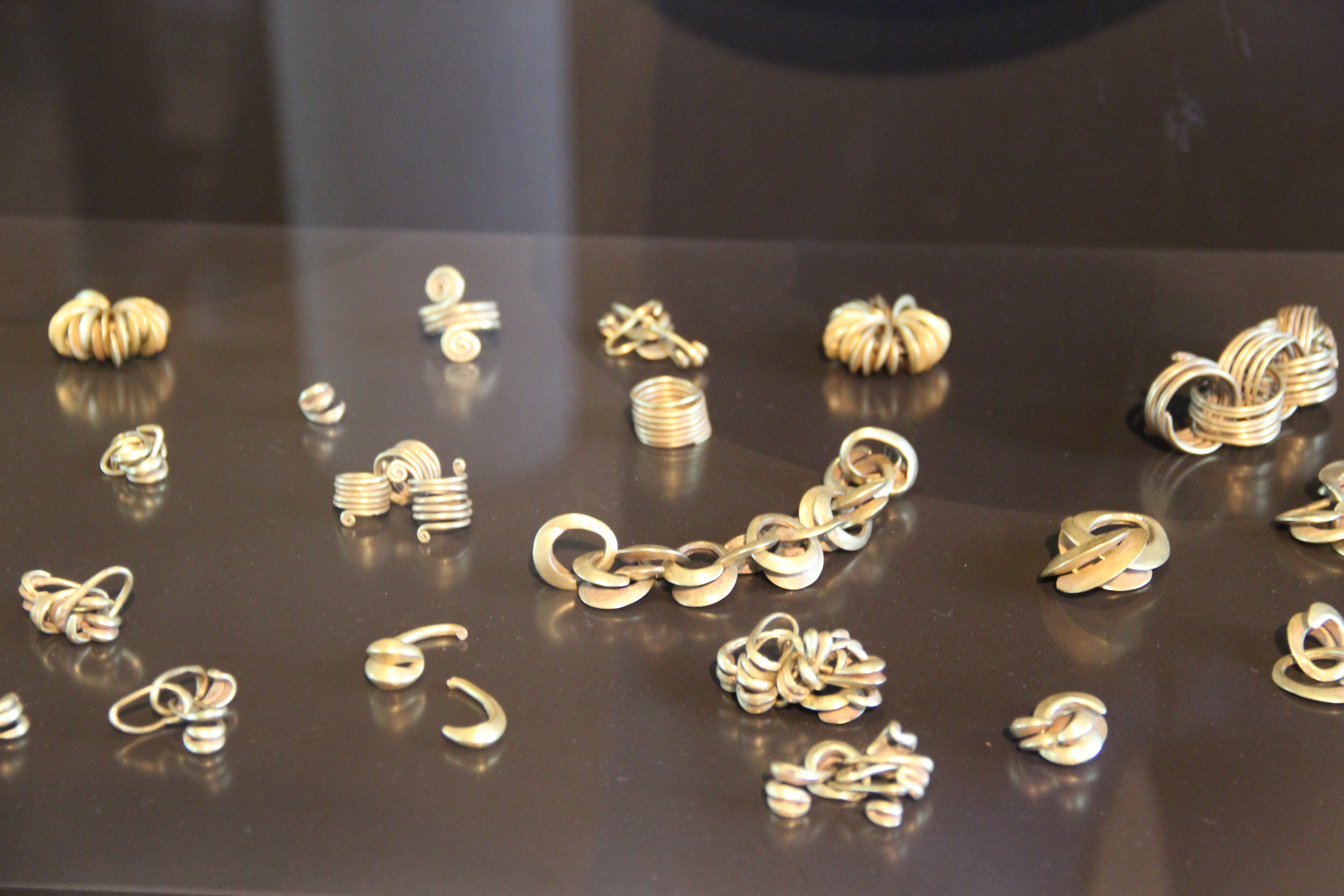
Gold lock-rings and bracelets from Pécs, Hungary.

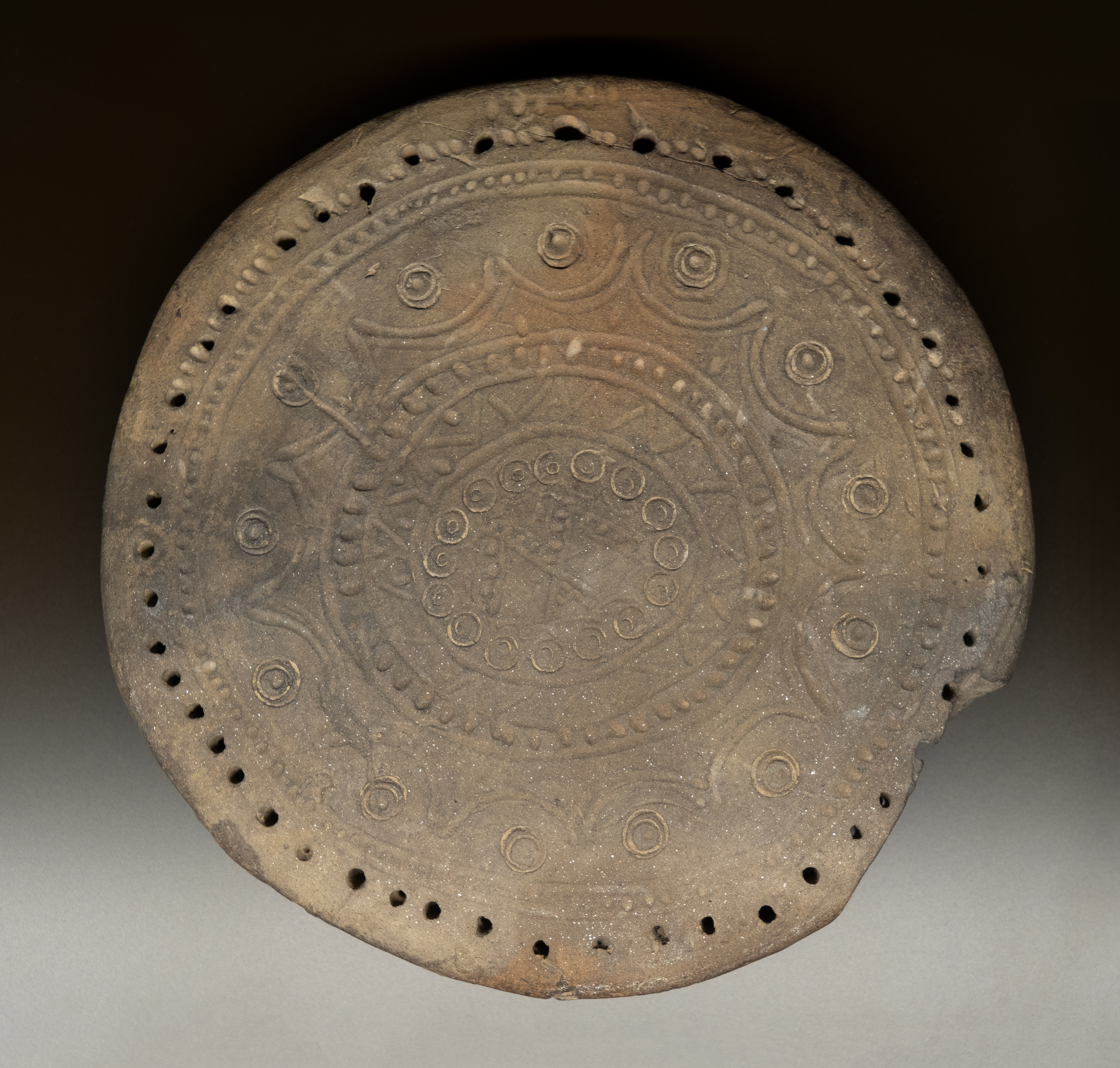
Decorated ceramic disc, Serbia

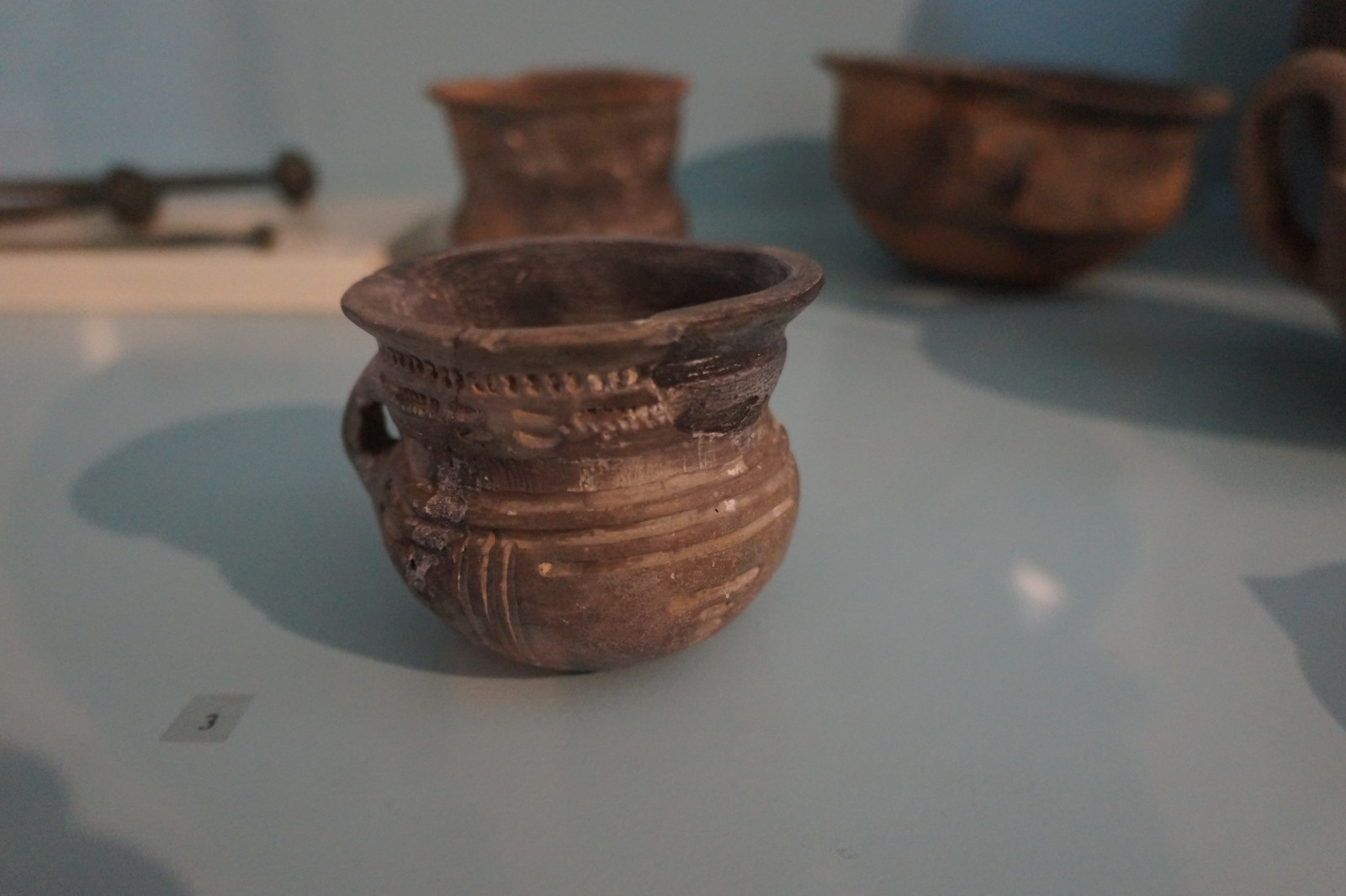
Pottery, Serbia

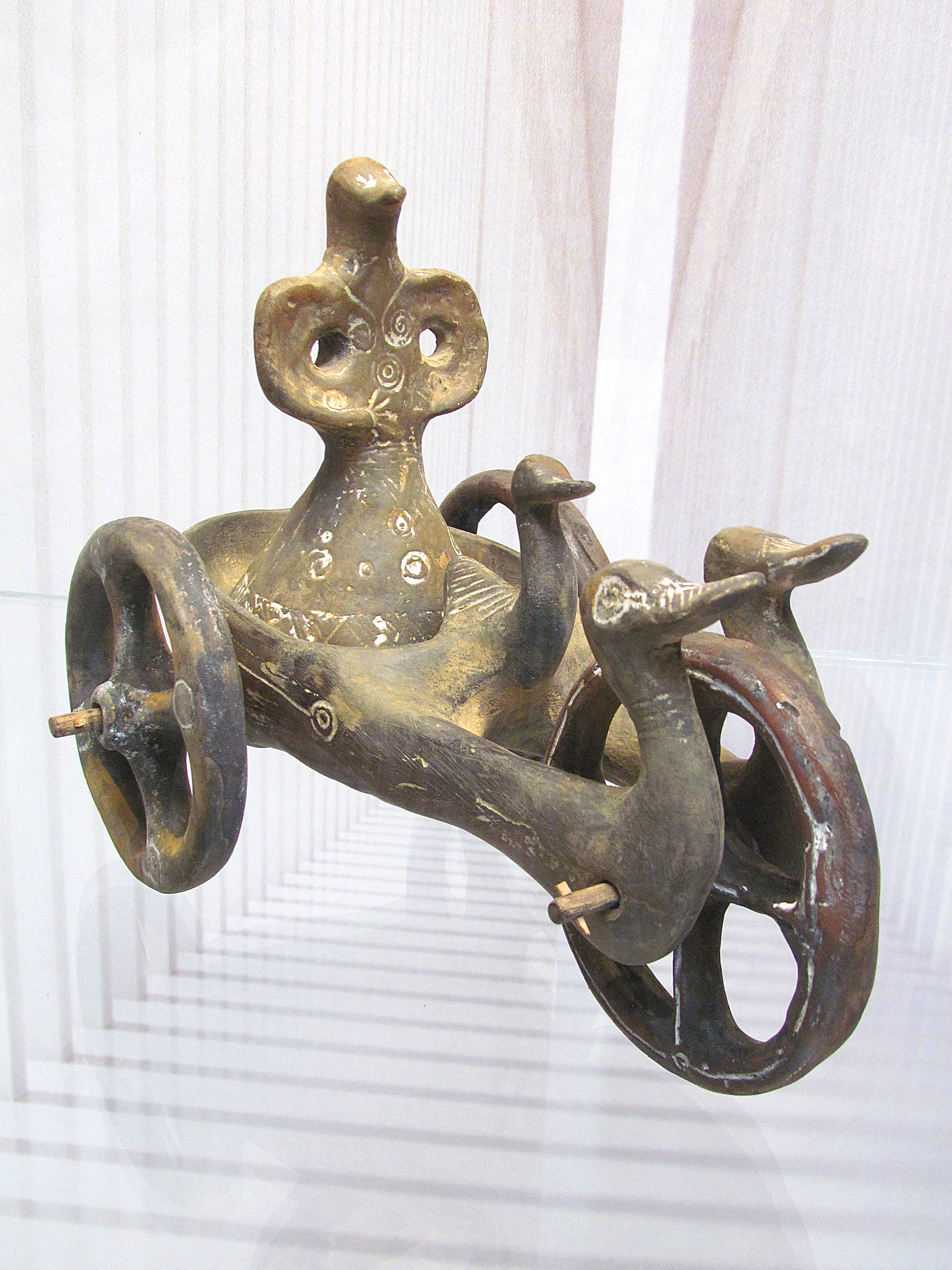
Chariot model 1 from Dupljaja, Serbia

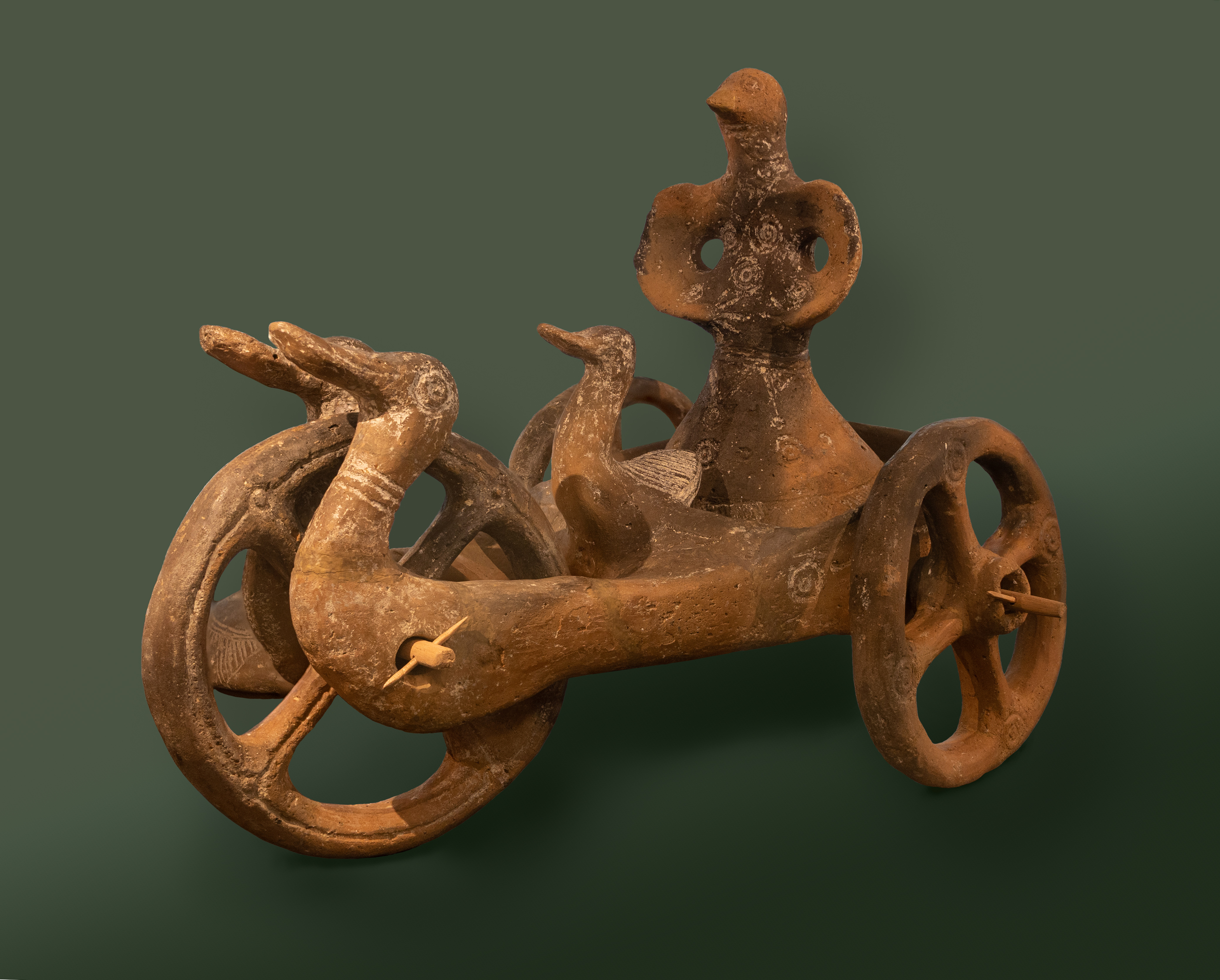
Chariot model 1, side view

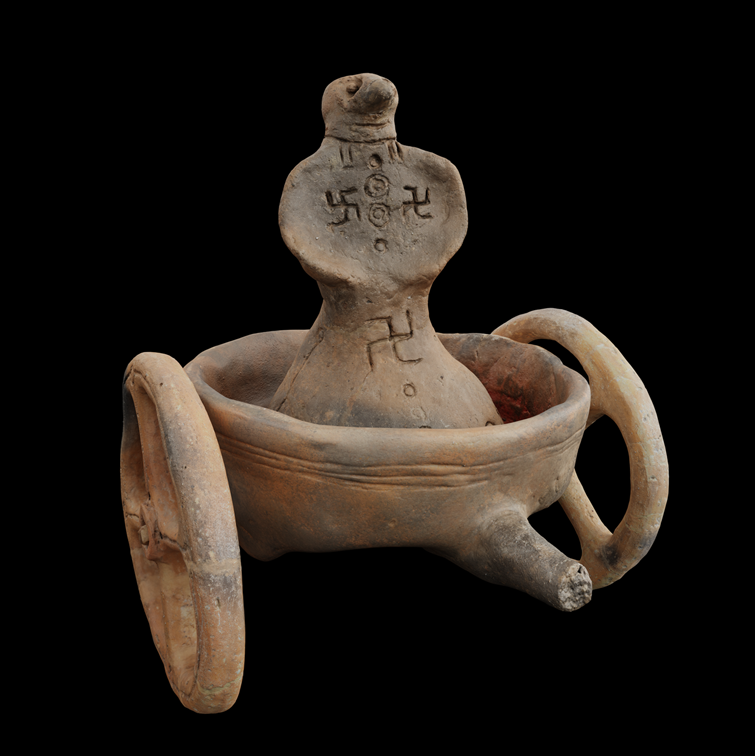
Chariot model 2 from Dupljaja, Serbia

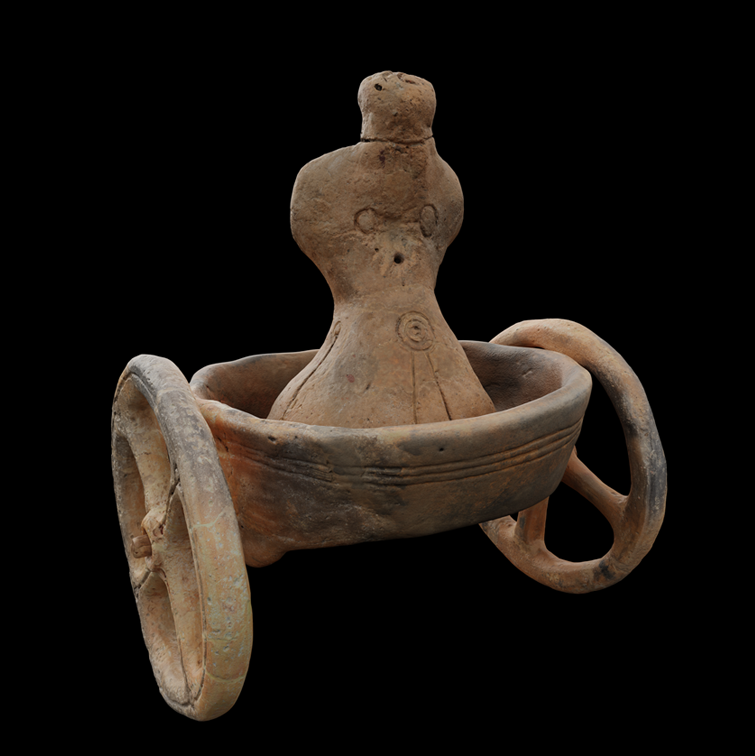
Chariot model 2, reverse view

== See also ==
- Ottomány culture
- Únětice culture
- Wietenberg culture
- Hatvan culture
- Mad'arovce culture
- Monteoru culture
- Tei culture
- Vatya culture
- Vatin culture
- Nordic Bronze Age
- Srubnaya culture
