= Maros culture =

Bronze Age archaeological culture in Banat

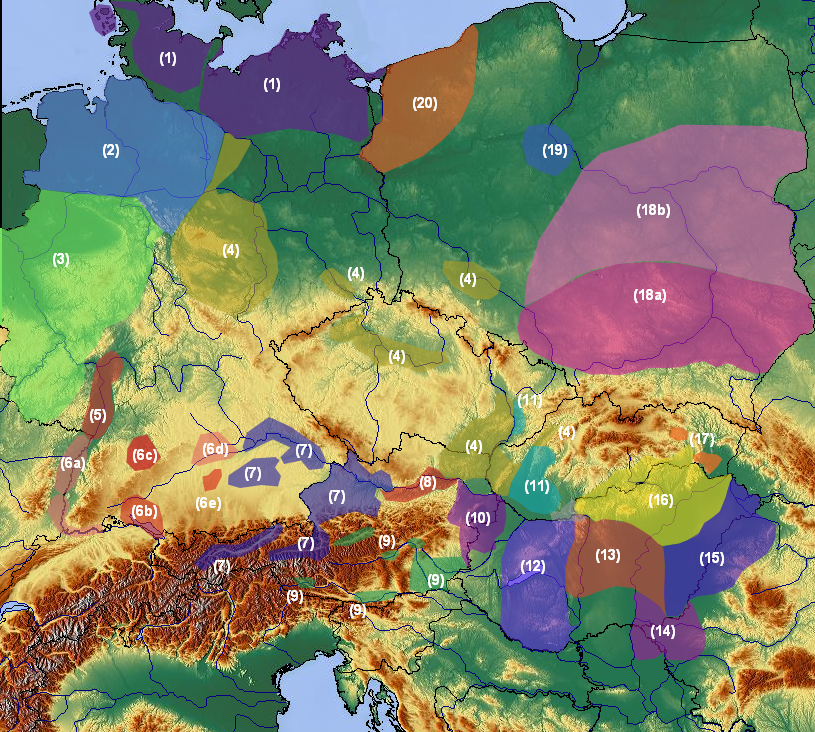
- Cultures of the early Bronze Age in Central Europe according to Paul Reinecke phase BA1. Mures culture marked with 14.
- Geographical range: Romania, Hungary, Serbia
- Period: Middle to Late Bronze Age
- Dates: c. 2000 BC – c. 1600 BC

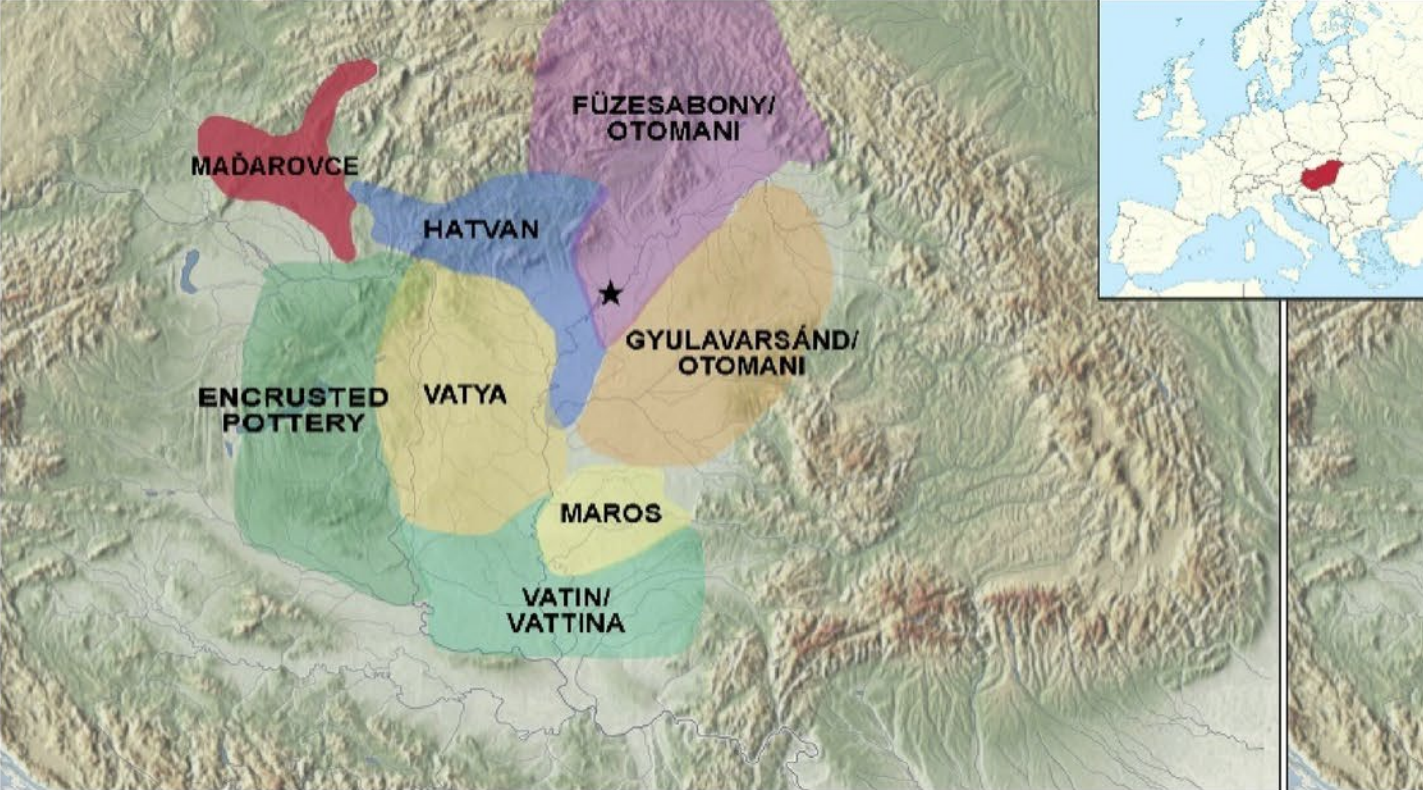
Geographic distribution of Middle Bronze Age cultures in the Carpathian Basin: Ottomány culture, Hatvan culture, Vatya culture, Vatin culture, Mad'arovce culture, Encrusted Pottery culture

A Middle and Late Bronze Ages culture existed in the diffusion of the archeological cultures on the lower course of the Mureș River. It is known as the Maros culture, the Periam-Pecica/Mureș culture, the Moriš culture or the Mokrin culture. It was located in today's Romania, Hungary and Serbia (northern Banat, southern Crișana, southeastern Southern Great Plain).

It was bordered in the south by the Vatin culture and in the north by the Otomani culture; the Transylvanian Plateau was occupied by the Wietenberg culture, which gradually ceded part of its northern area to the Suciu de Sus culture. All of these cultures evolved together, the earliest being evidently the Mureș culture, the Suciu de Sus culture appearing later.

Archaeological sites include:

- Șanțul Mare
- Pecica
- Mokrin

== Gallery ==
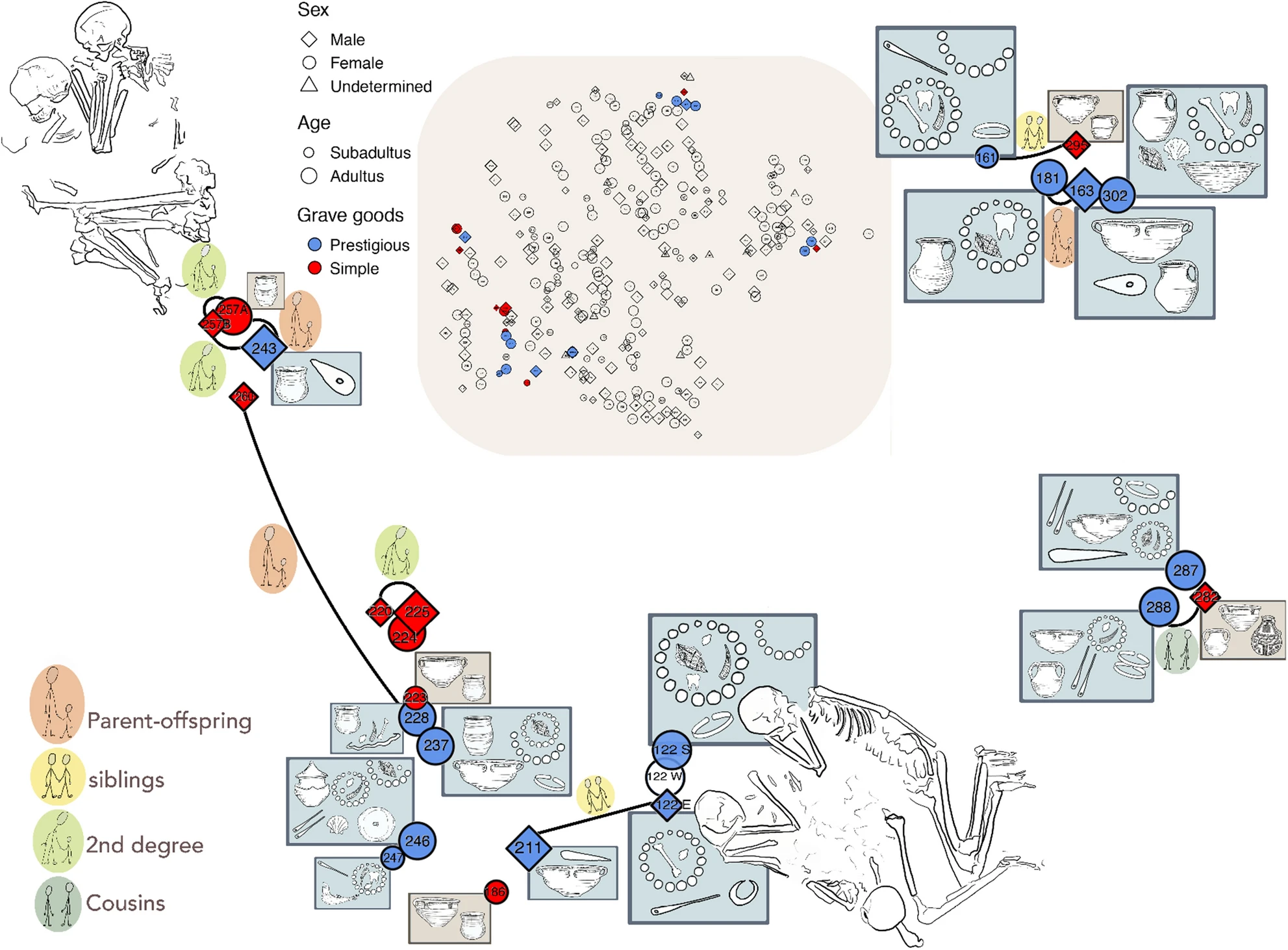
Burials at the Mokrin necropolis

== See also ==
- Ziridava
