= Pecica =

Pecica Pécska
- Town
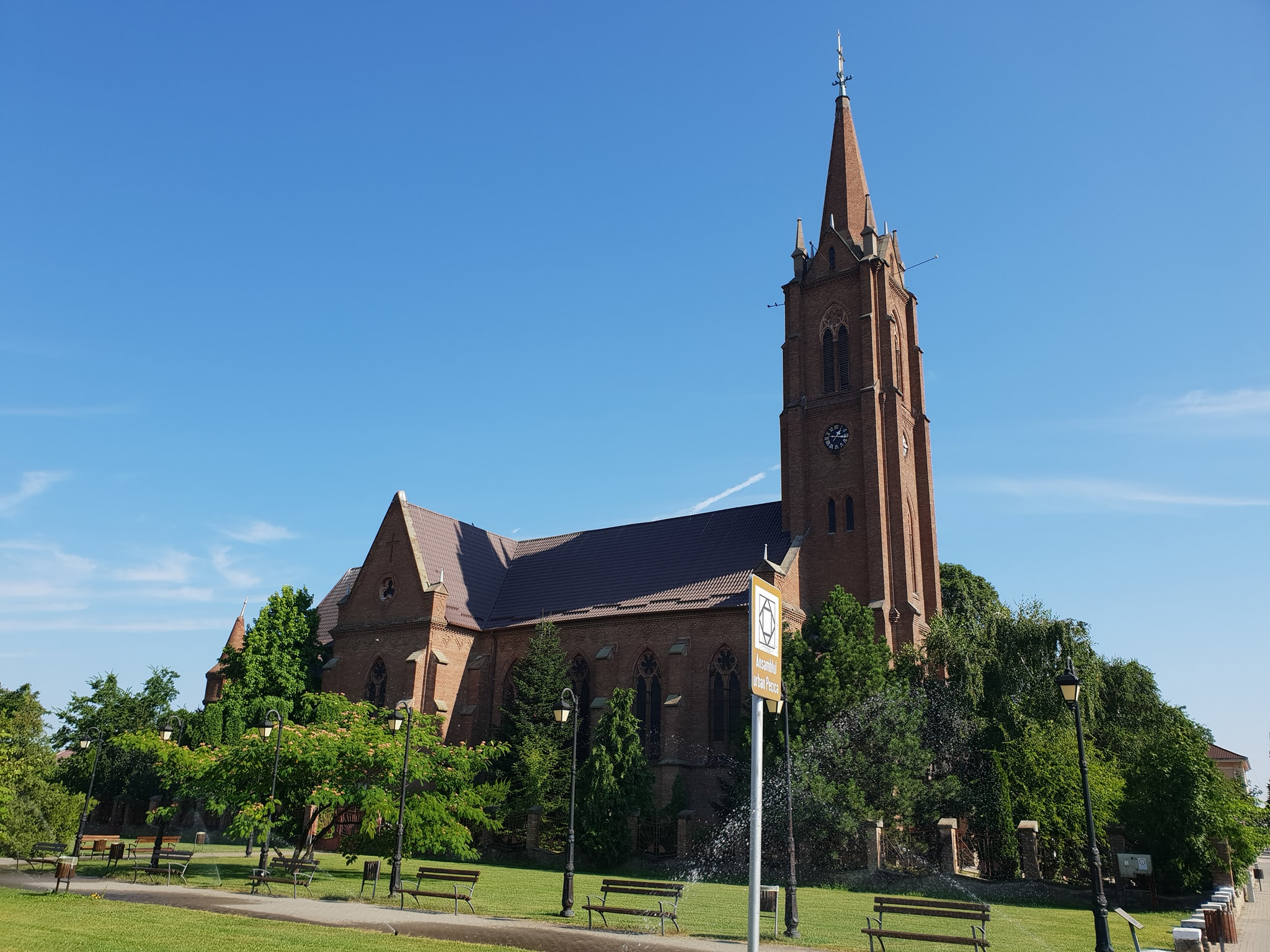
- The urban ensemble

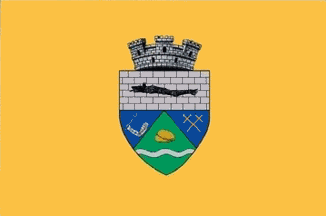
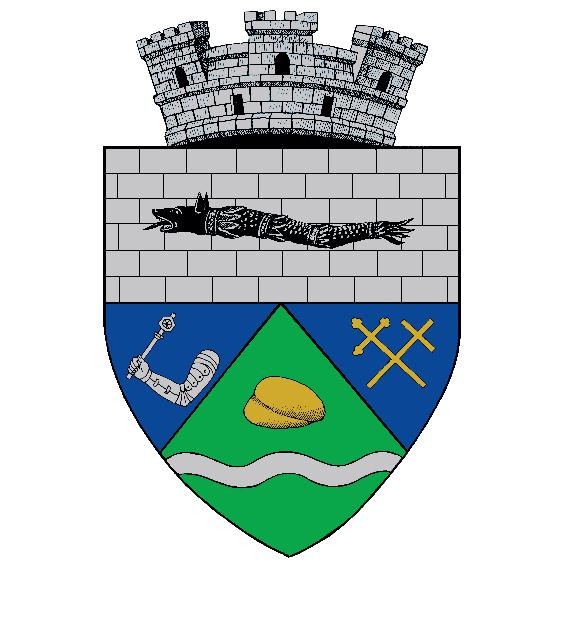
- Flag Coat of arms

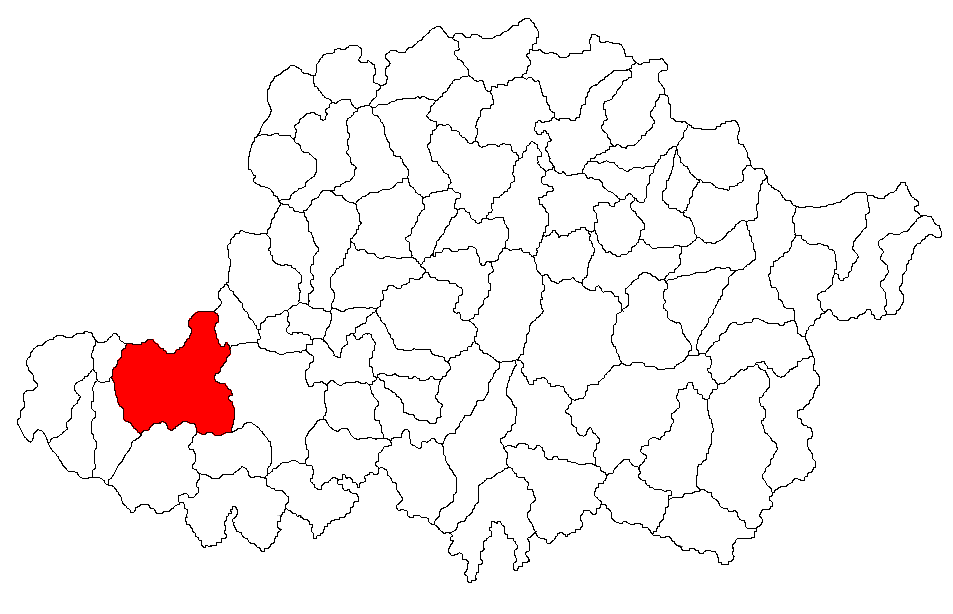
- Location in Arad County
- Interactive map of Pecica
- Location in Romania
- Coordinates: 46°10′12″N 21°4′12″E
- Country: Romania
- County: Arad

Government
  - Mayor (2024–2028): Petru Antal (PNL)
- Area: 237.17 km^{2} (91.57 sq mi)
- Elevation: 103 m (338 ft)
- Population (2021-12-01): 11,950
  - Density: 50.39/km^{2} (130.5/sq mi)
- Time zone: UTC+02:00 (EET)
  - Summer (DST): UTC+03:00 (EEST)
- Postal code: 317235
- Area code: (+40) 02 57
- Vehicle reg.: AR
- Website: www.pecica.ro

Pecica (Romanian pronunciation: [ˈpet͡ʃʲ.ka]; Hungarian: Pécska; German: Petschka; Serbian: Печка/Pečka) is a town in Arad County, western Romania. In ancient times it was a Dacian fortress called Ziridava and today it is an important archeological site. Situated at 25 kilometres (16 mi) from Arad, it was declared a town in 2004. Its administrative territory extends into the Arad Plateau. The town administers three villages: Bodrogu Vechi (Óbodrog), Sederhat (Szederhát) and Turnu (Tornya).

== Etymology ==
The name "Pecica" is derived from the name "Pečka", meaning oven.

== Population ==
Historical population
Year	Pop.	±%
2002	13,024	—
2011	11,885	−8.7%
2021	11,950	+0.5%
Source: Census data

At the 2021 census, Pecica had a population of 11,950. At the 2011 census, the town had 11,885 inhabitants; of those, 62.2% were Romanians, 28% Hungarians, 8.4% Roma, 0.36% Serbs, 0.33% Slovaks, and 0.7% of other or undeclared nationalities.

== History ==
Due to the abundance of archaeological finds of the zone an important historic period known as the Periam-Pecica culture was named after the settlement. The history of the localities Pecica, Bodrogu Vechi, Sederhat and Turnu is closely connected with the events making highly memorable the entire zone of the Arad Plateau.

The first mention in documents of the locality dates back to 1335 when it was known as Petk. Sederhat was registered only in 1913, Turnu in 1333 under the name of Mok, while Bodrogu Vechi in 1422 under the name of Bodruch. It has a complex political and multicultural history with periods of direct Ottoman rule, periods of Habsburg monarchy and Kingdom of Hungary. After the Austro-Hungarian Compromise of 1867, it became part of the Kingdom of Hungary within Austria-Hungary. When the Treaty of Trianon was signed, Pecica and the surrounding area became part of the Kingdom of Romania. Since then the town has been part of Romania.

Important in the history of Pecica is in 1689 when the Habsburg monarchy carried out a massive colonization with Serbs, in order to protect the border on the Mureș river against the Turks. They passed into Arad County. 70-80,000 Serbs together with their bishop from Serbian Patriarchate of Peć , Arsenije Petrović. In this way, the Orthodox church in the region was placed under the hierarchy of the Metropolitanate of Karlovci. The colonizers received several privileges in exchange for border services. However, coexistence with the feudal administration of the region does not prove to be entirely viable.

Thus, between 1751-1752, the revolt with Captain Pera Segedinac broke out in Pecica. Following its suppression, a number of approx. 32,000 Serbs emigrated to the steppes on the right bank of the Dniester. Numerous villages remained depopulated.

== Economy ==
Although the economy of the town is prevalent agricultural, the secondary and tertiary economic sectors have also developed recently. Besides agriculture, the industry of petrol and rock-gas is also well represented. The initiation of the frontier crossing point at Turnu and the trimming of the thermal water springs should be the most important chances for the economic development of the town.

== Tourism ==
Tourist attractions include the Roman Catholic Church, the Pecica Cultural Center, and the "Lunca Mureșului" park.

== Notable residents ==
- Marius Cihărean (born 1975), Romanian weightlifter
- Roman Ciorogariu (1852–1936), Romanian Orthodox bishop, journalist and educator
- Kuno von Klebelsberg (1875–1932), Hungarian politician, minister of interior and minister of culture
- Mircea Petescu (1943–2018), Romanian footballer and coach
- Pera Segedinac (1655-1736), leader of the Serbian Militia along the Mureș river

== Sister cities ==
- Woluwe-Saint-Pierre, Belgium
- Battonya, Hungary

== See also ==
- Ziridava
- Pecica culture
