= Bronze Age Europe =

Archeological age, 3200–600 BC

- Geographical range: Europe
- Period: Prehistoric Europe, Ancient Europe
- Dates: 4th millennium BC—1st millennium BC
- Preceded by: Chalcolithic Europe, Neolithic Europe, Old Europe (archaeology)
- Followed by: Iron Age Europe

The European Bronze Age is characterized by bronze artifacts and the use of bronze implements. The regional Bronze Age succeeds the Neolithic and Copper Age and is followed by the Iron Age. It starts with the Aegean Bronze Age c. 3200 BC and the Maykop culture in the North Caucasus c. 3500 BC, and spans the entire 3rd and 2nd millennia BC (including the Únětice culture, Ottomány culture, British Bronze Age, Argaric culture, Nordic Bronze Age, Tumulus culture, Nuragic culture, Terramare culture, Urnfield culture and Lusatian culture), lasting until c. 800 BC in central Europe.

Arsenical bronze was produced from the 4th millennium BC (prior to the introduction of tin bronze), and continued as the dominant form of bronze across Europe through most of the 3rd millennium BC. Britain was the first region in Europe to fully adopt tin-bronze technology and switch all metalwork from copper and arsenical bronze to full tin-bronze in the period 2200-2100 BC. Tin bronze foil had already been produced in southeastern Europe on a small scale in the Chalcolithic era, with examples from Pločnik in Serbia dated to c. 4650 BC, as well as 14 other artefacts from Bulgaria and Serbia dated to before 4000 BC, showing that early tin bronze developed independently in Europe 1500 years before the first tin bronze alloys in the Near East. This bronze production lasted for c. 500 years in the Balkans but disappeared at the end of the 5th millennium, coinciding with the "collapse of large cultural complexes in north-eastern Bulgaria and Thrace in the late fifth millennium BC". Tin bronzes using cassiterite tin were subsequently reintroduced to the area some 1500 years later.

== History ==
=== Aegean ===
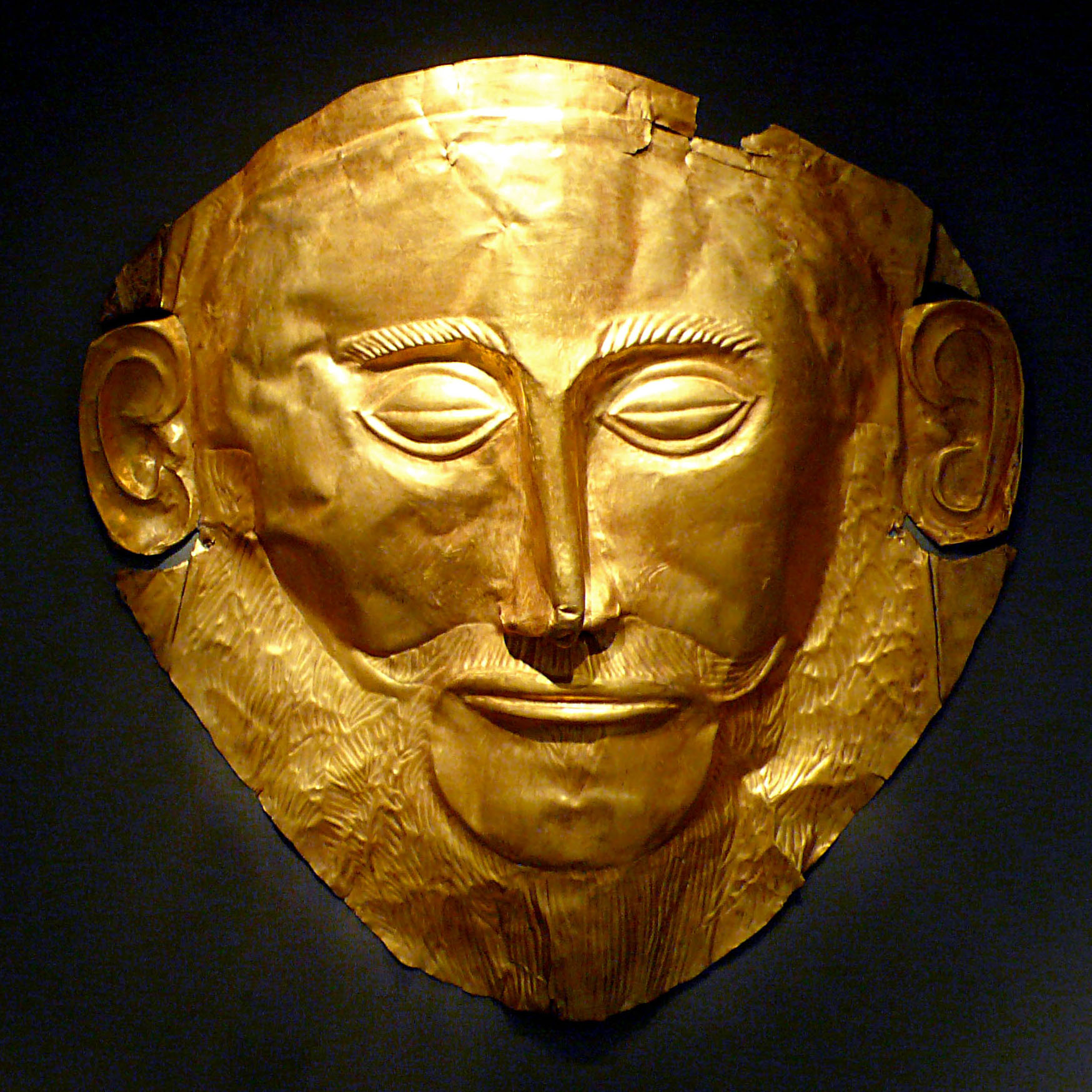
Gold 'Mask of Agamemnon', Greece, 1550 BC

The Aegean Bronze Age began around 3200 BC when civilizations first established a far-ranging trade network. This network imported tin and charcoal to Cyprus, where copper was mined and alloyed with the tin to produce bronze. Bronze objects were then exported far and wide and supported the trade. Isotopic analysis of the tin in some Mediterranean bronze objects indicates it came from as far away as Great Britain.

Around 1600 BC, the eruption of Thera destroyed the site of Akrotiri and damaged Minoan sites in eastern Crete. The further impact of this event is poorly understood.

Starting in the 15th century BC, the Mycenaeans began to spread their influence throughout the Aegean and Western Anatolia. By c. 1450 BC, the palace of Knossos was ruled by a Mycenaean elite who formed a hybrid Minoan-Mycenaean culture. Mycenaeans also colonized several other Aegean islands, reaching as far as Rhodes. Thus the Mycenaeans became the dominant power of the region, marking the beginning of the Mycenaean 'Koine' era (from Greek: Κοινή, common), a highly uniform culture that spread in mainland Greece and the Aegean. The Mycenaean Greeks introduced several innovations in the fields of engineering, architecture and military infrastructure, while trade over vast areas of the Mediterranean was essential for the Mycenaean economy. Their syllabic script, the Linear B, offers the first written records of the Greek language and their religion already included several deities that can be also found in the Olympic Pantheon. Mycenaean Greece was dominated by a warrior elite society and consisted of a network of palace states that developed rigid hierarchical, political, social and economic systems. At the head of this society was the king, known as wanax.

Archaeological cultures of the Bronze Age Aegean include:

- Northeast Aegean culture
- Cycladic culture
- Helladic culture
- Minoan civilization
- Mycenaean Greece
- Postpalatial Bronze Age
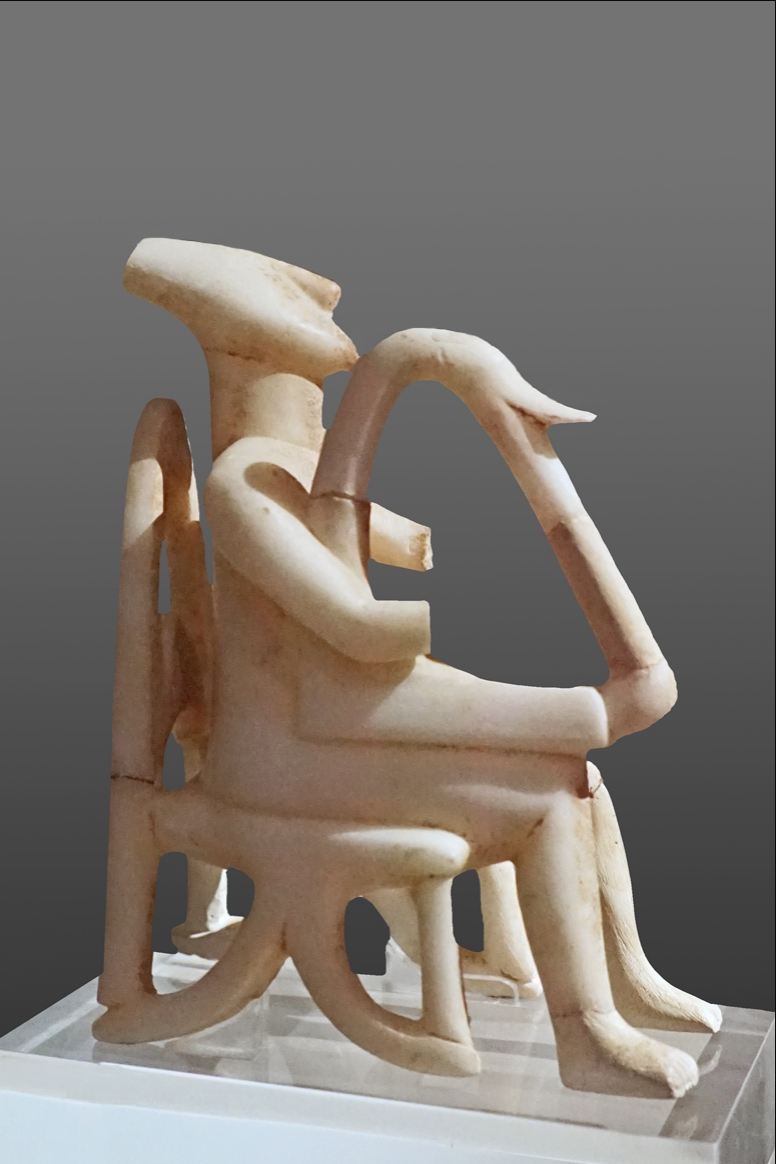
Marble figurine, Cycladic culture, 2700 BC

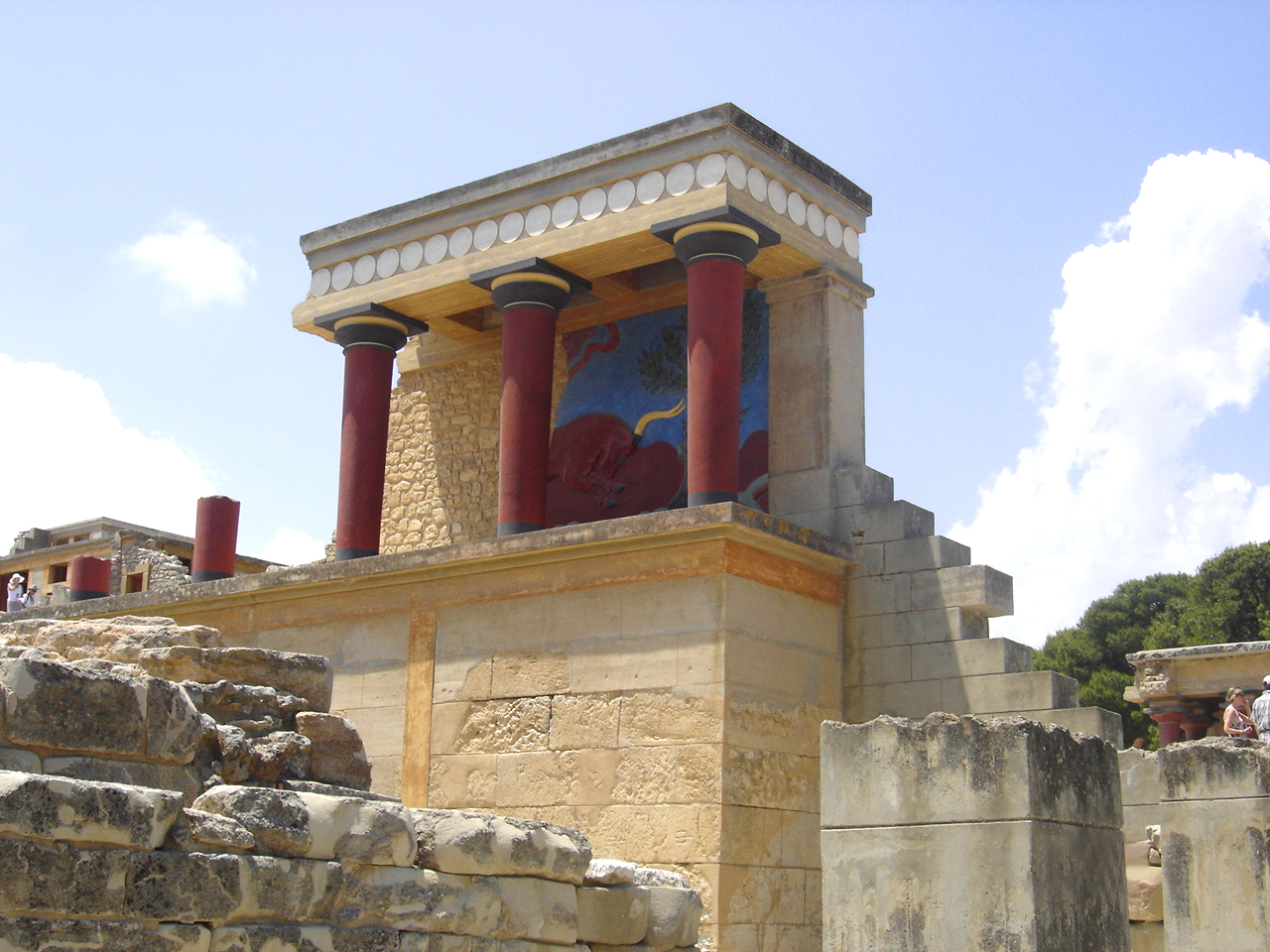
Minoan palace at Knossos, Crete

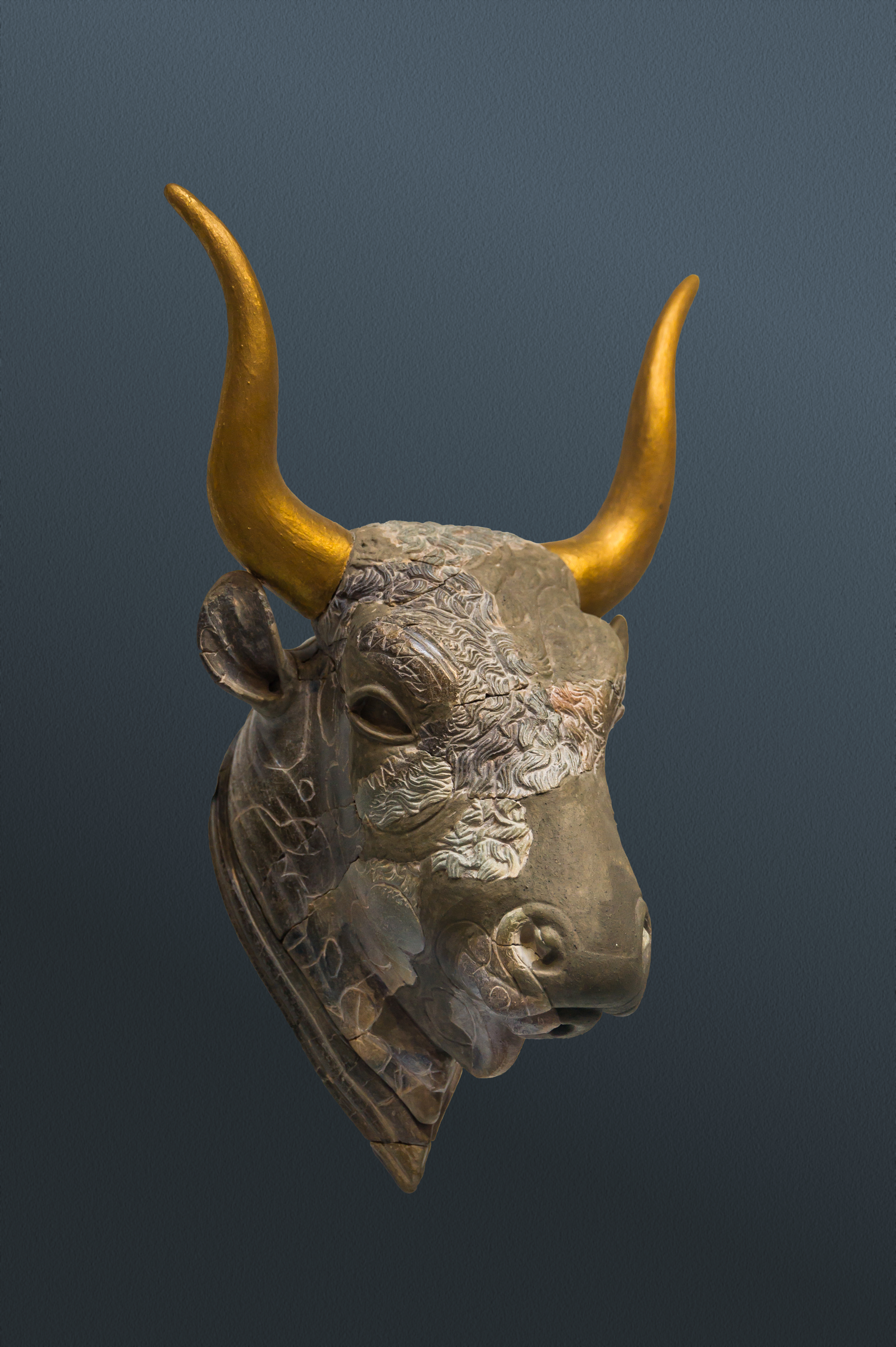
Minoan rhyton, Crete, 1500 BC

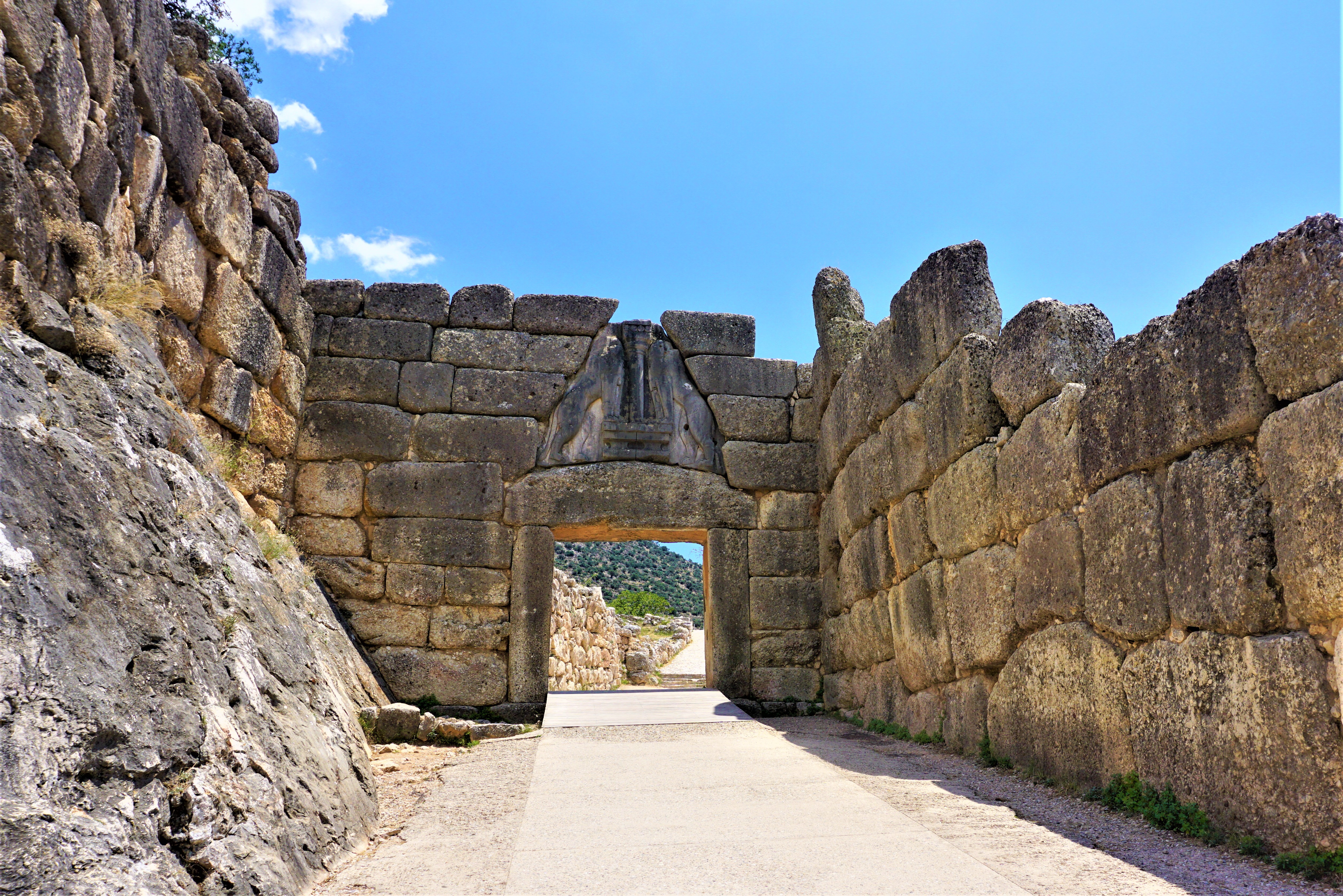
Lion Gate, Mycenae, Greece, c. 1250 BC

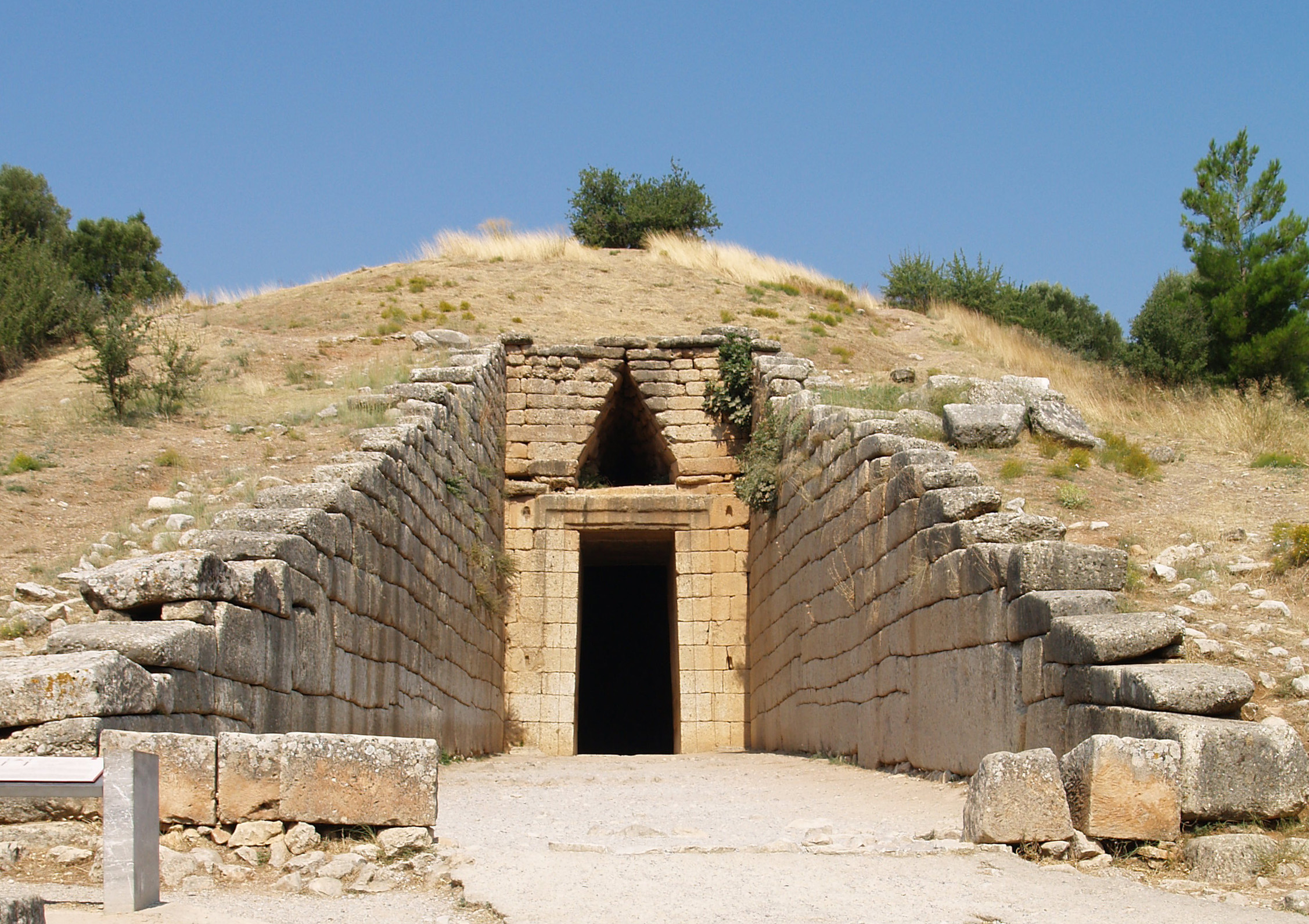
Treasury of Atreus, Greece, c. 1300 BC

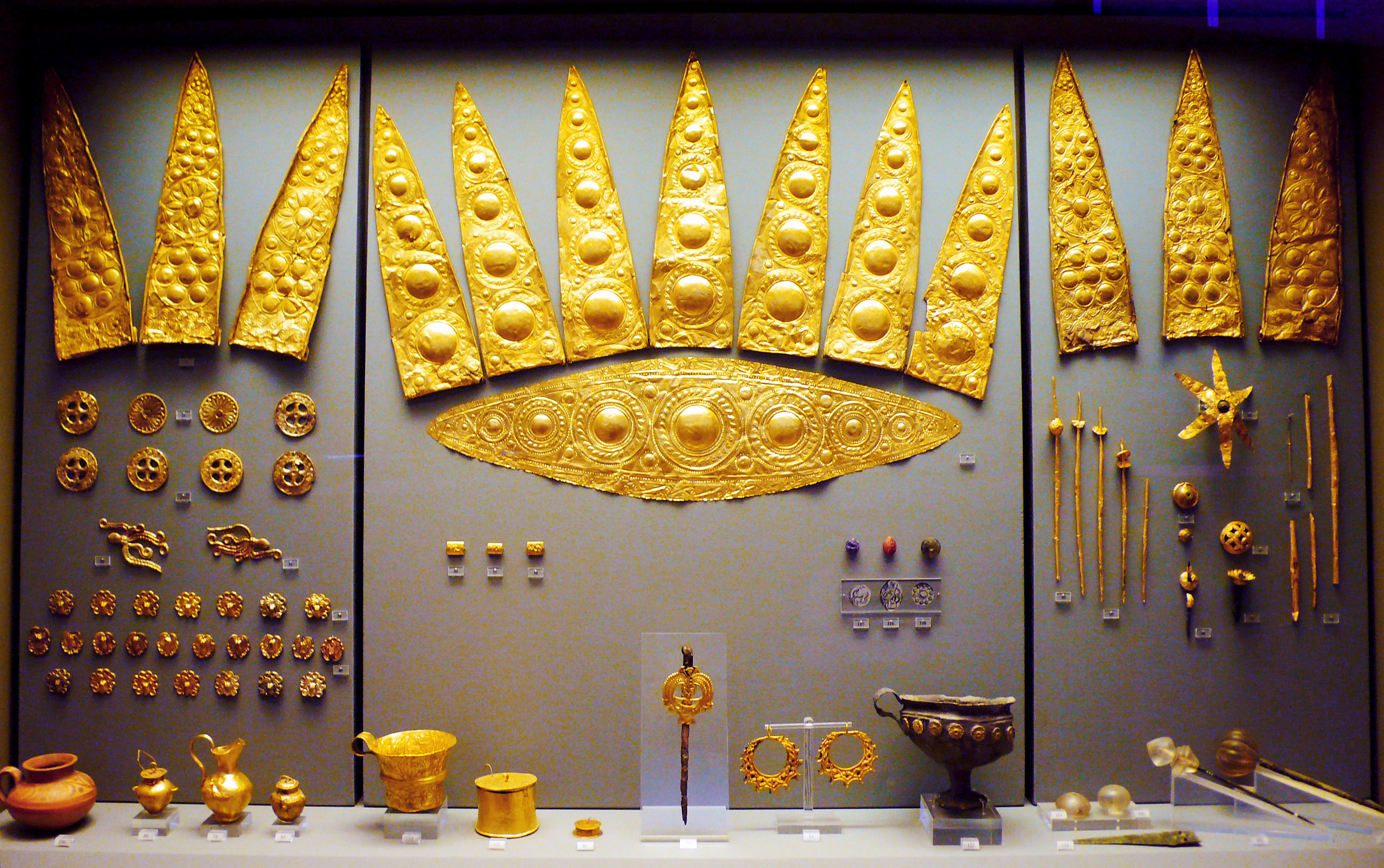
Gold artefacts from Mycenae, 16th century BC

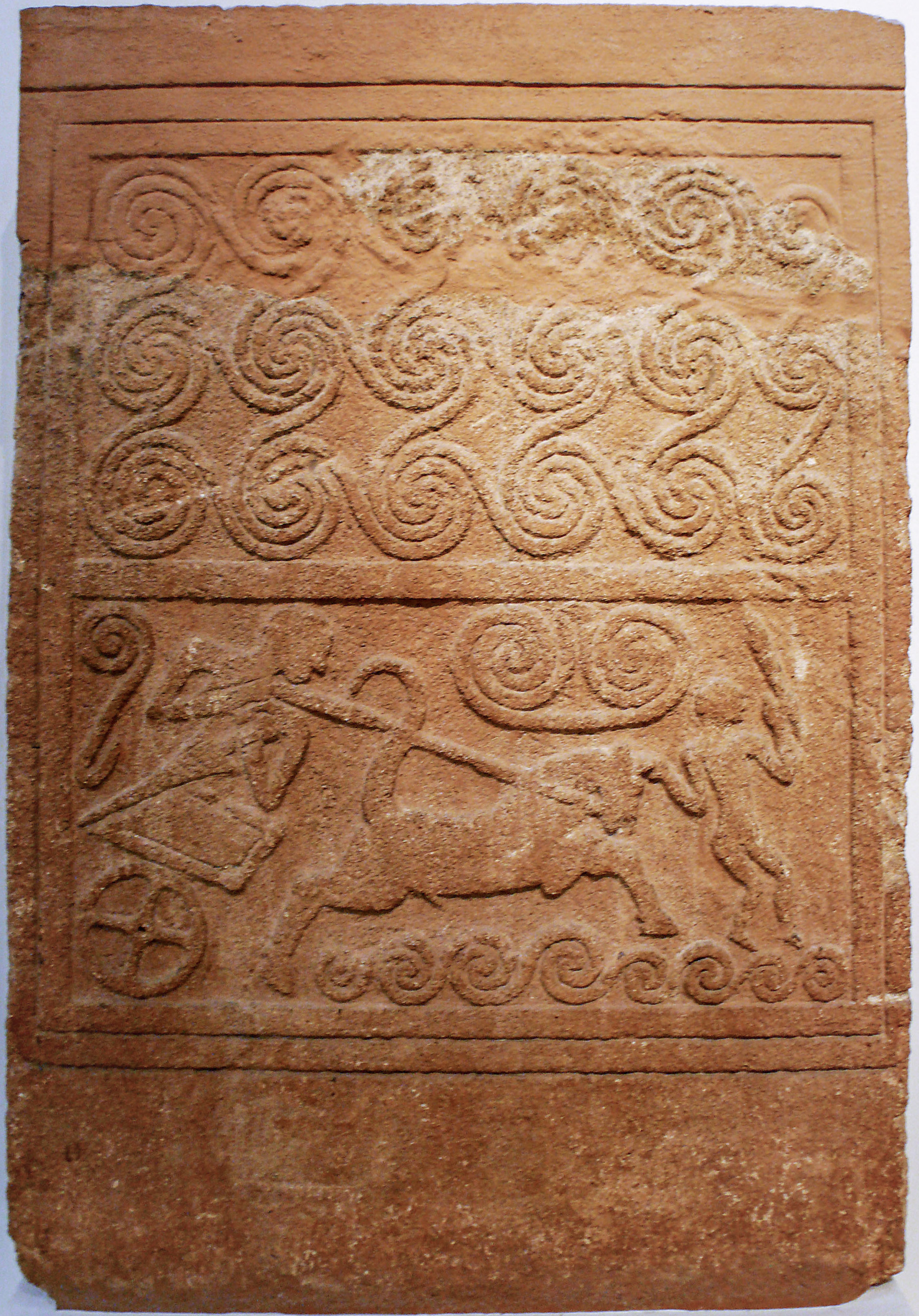
Stone stele from Grave Circle A, Mycenae, 16th century BC

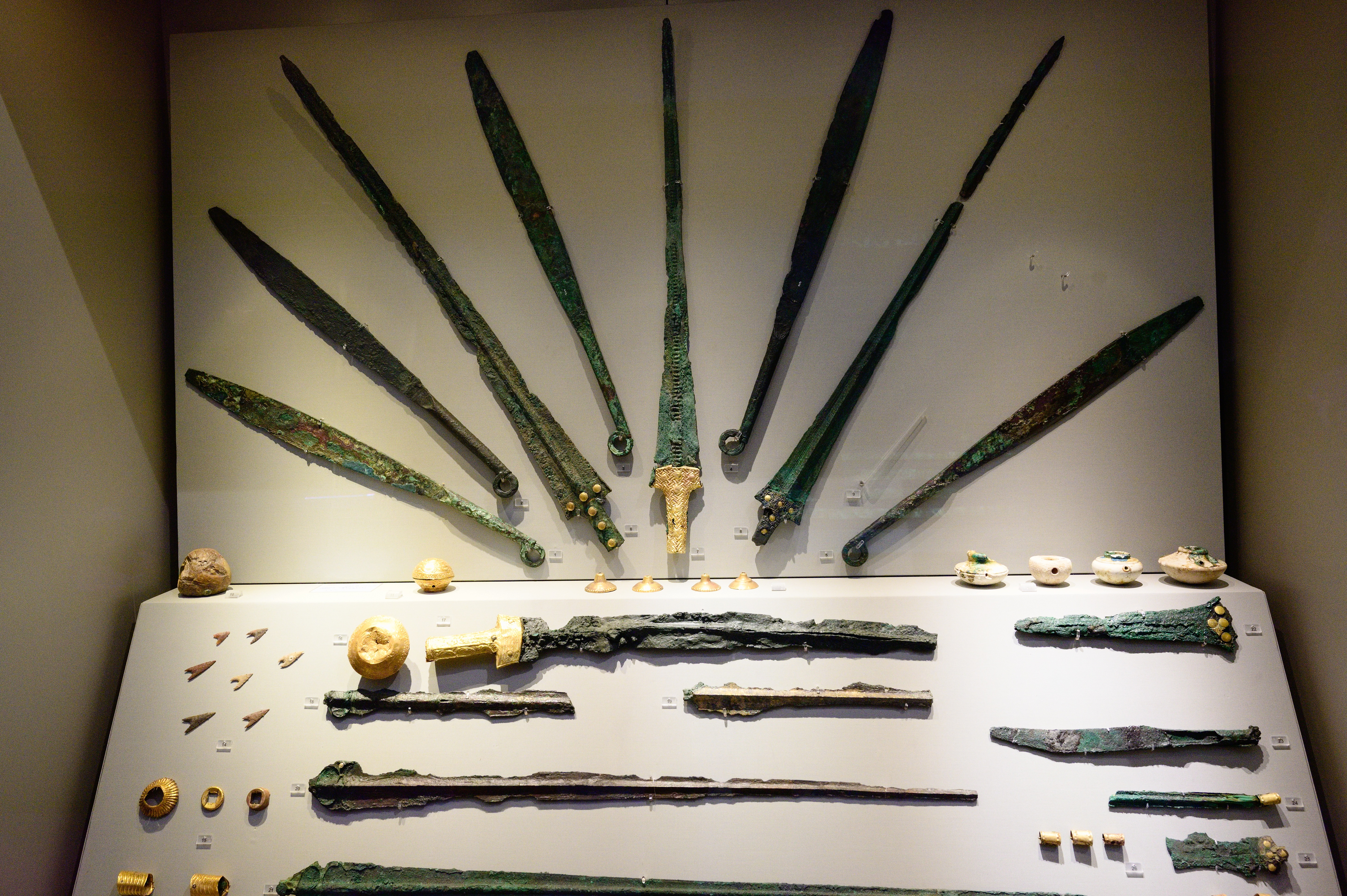
Mycenaean weapons and gold, Mycenae Grave Circle A

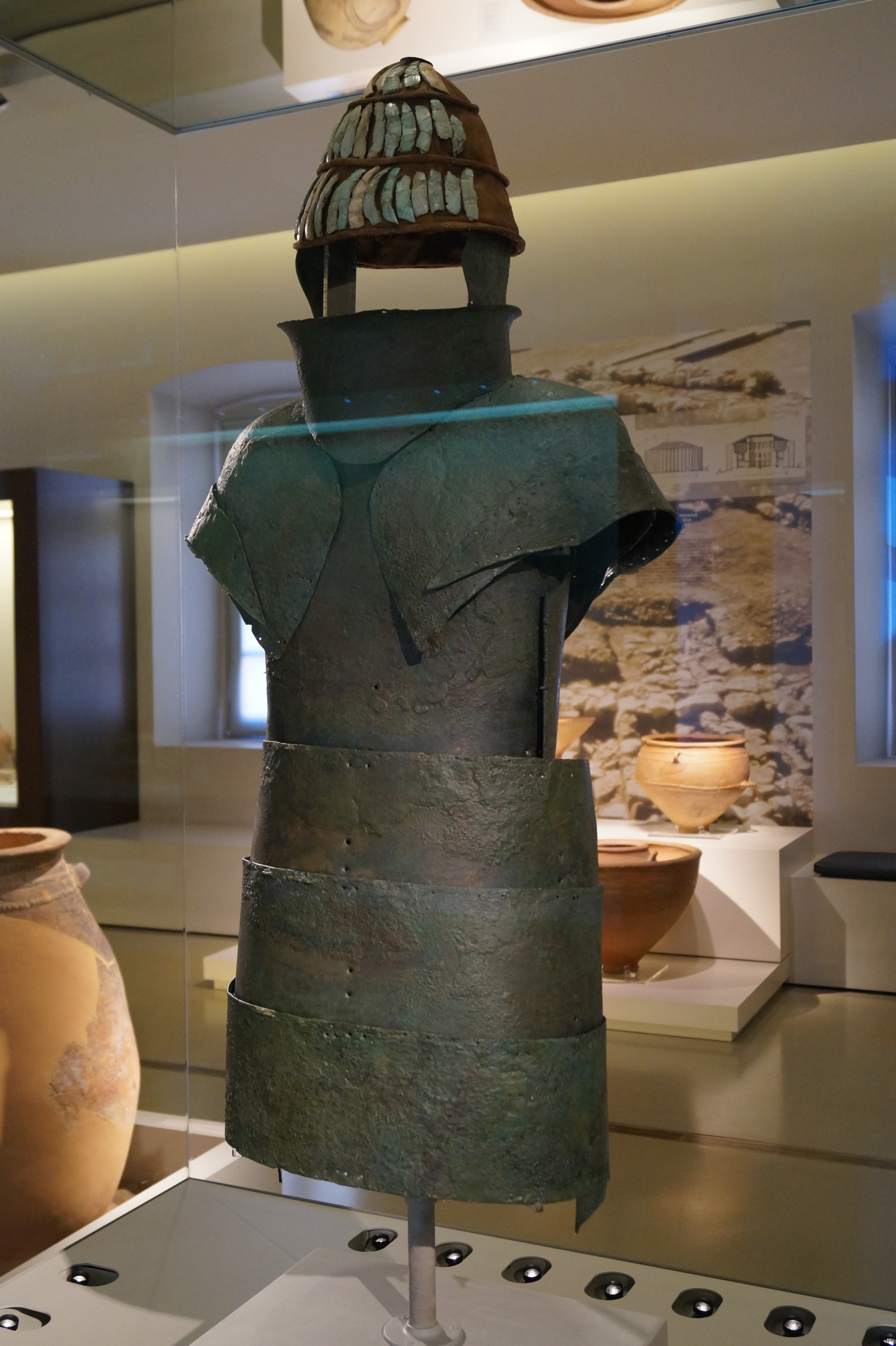
Armour from Dendra

=== Southeast Europe ===
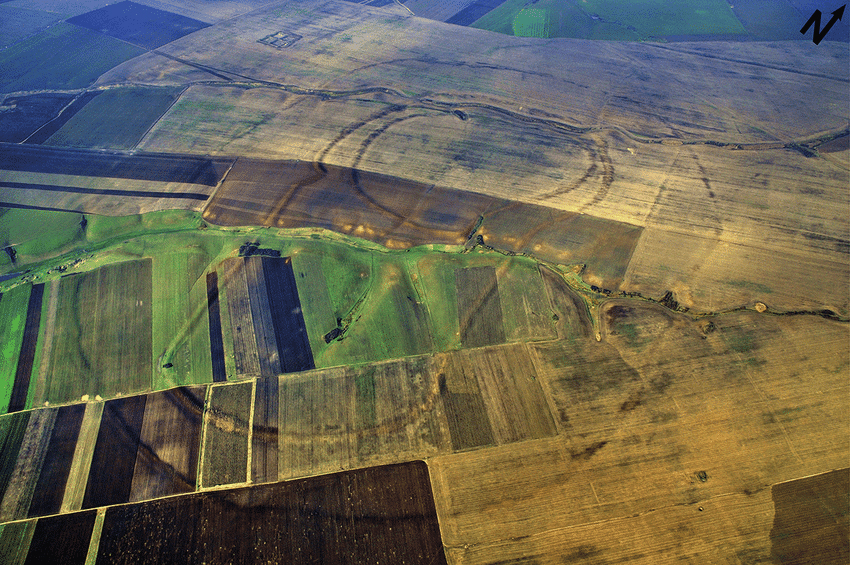
Cornești-Iarcuri ramparts, Urnfield culture, Romania, c. 1300 BC

A study in the journal Antiquity from 2013 reported the discovery of a tin bronze foil from the Pločnik archaeological site dated to c. 4650 BC, as well as 14 other artefacts from Serbia and Bulgaria dated to before 4000 BC, showed that early tin bronze was more common than previously thought and developed independently in Europe 1,500 years before the first tin bronze alloys in the Near East. The production of complex tin bronzes lasted for c. 500 years in the Balkans. The authors reported that evidence for the production of such complex bronzes disappears at the end of the 5th millennium coinciding with the "collapse of large cultural complexes in north-eastern Bulgaria and Thrace in the late fifth millennium BC". Tin bronzes using cassiterite tin would be reintroduced to the area again some 1,500 years later.

Bronze Age archaeological cultures in Southeast Europe include:

- Yamnaya culture
- Ezero culture
- Baden culture
- Coțofeni culture
- Vučedol culture
- Cetina culture
- Wietenberg culture
- Monteoru culture
- Tei culture
- Castellieri culture
- Encrusted Pottery culture
- Vatin culture
- Noua-Sabatinovka-Coslogeni culture
- Urnfield culture
- Gáva-Holigrady culture
- Glasinac-Mati culture
- Central Bosnian culture
- Thracian culture
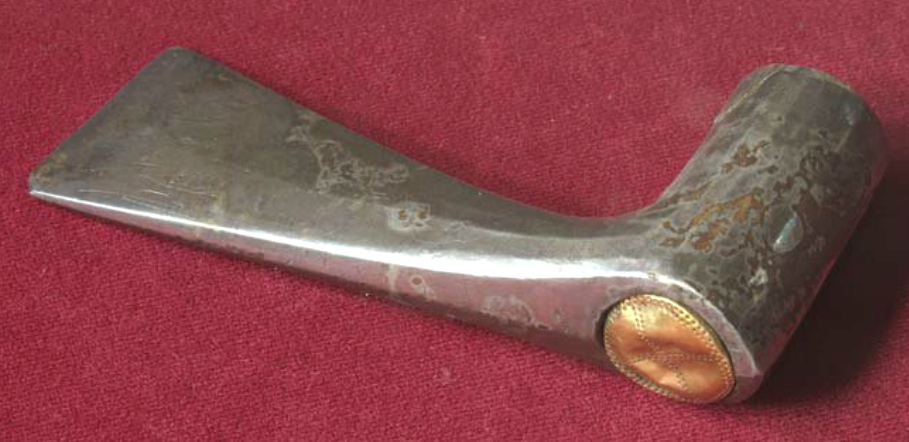
Silver and gold axe, Vučedol culture, Montenegro, c. 2200 BC

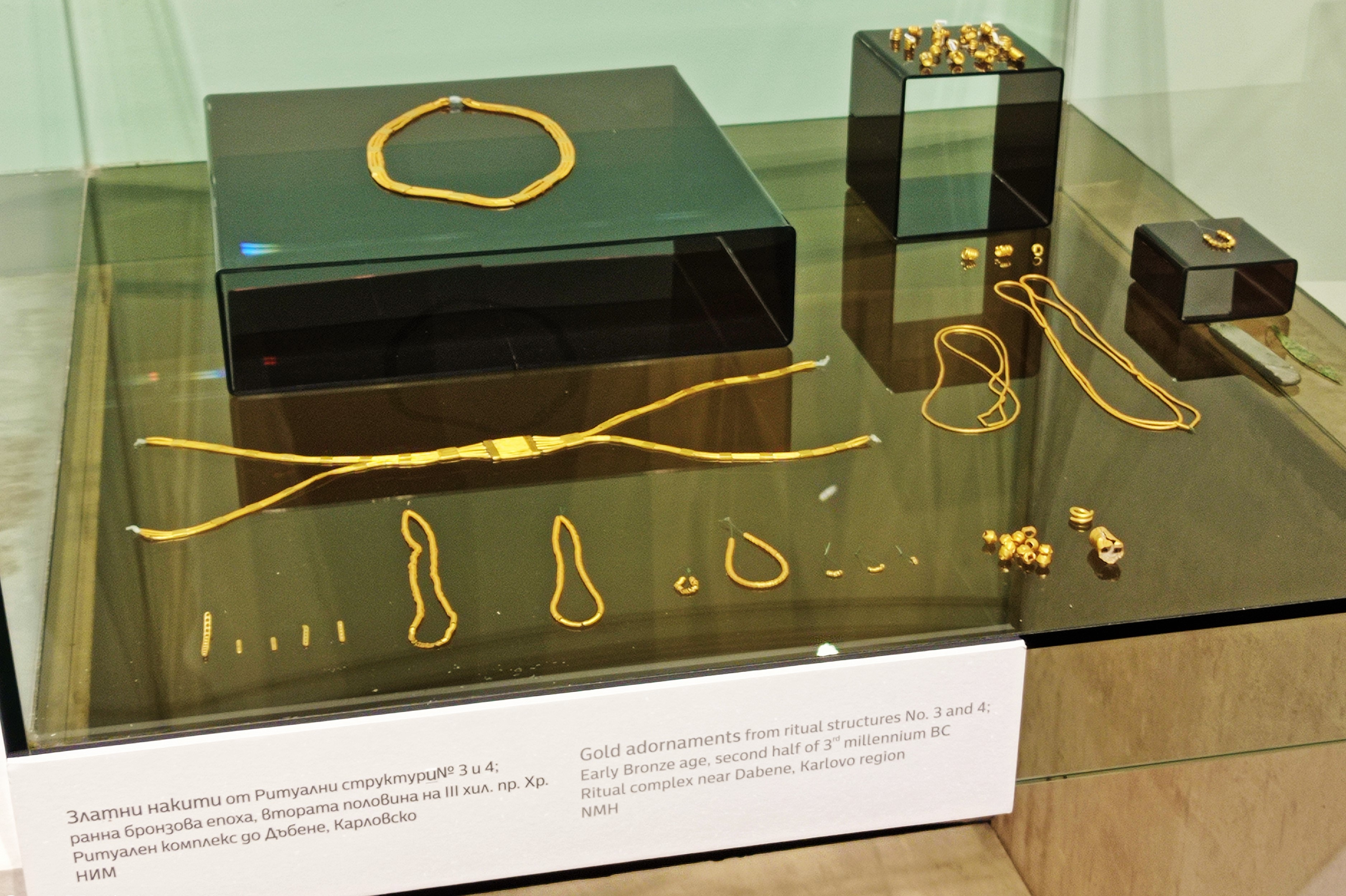
Dabene Treasure, Bulgaria, c. 2450-2000 BC

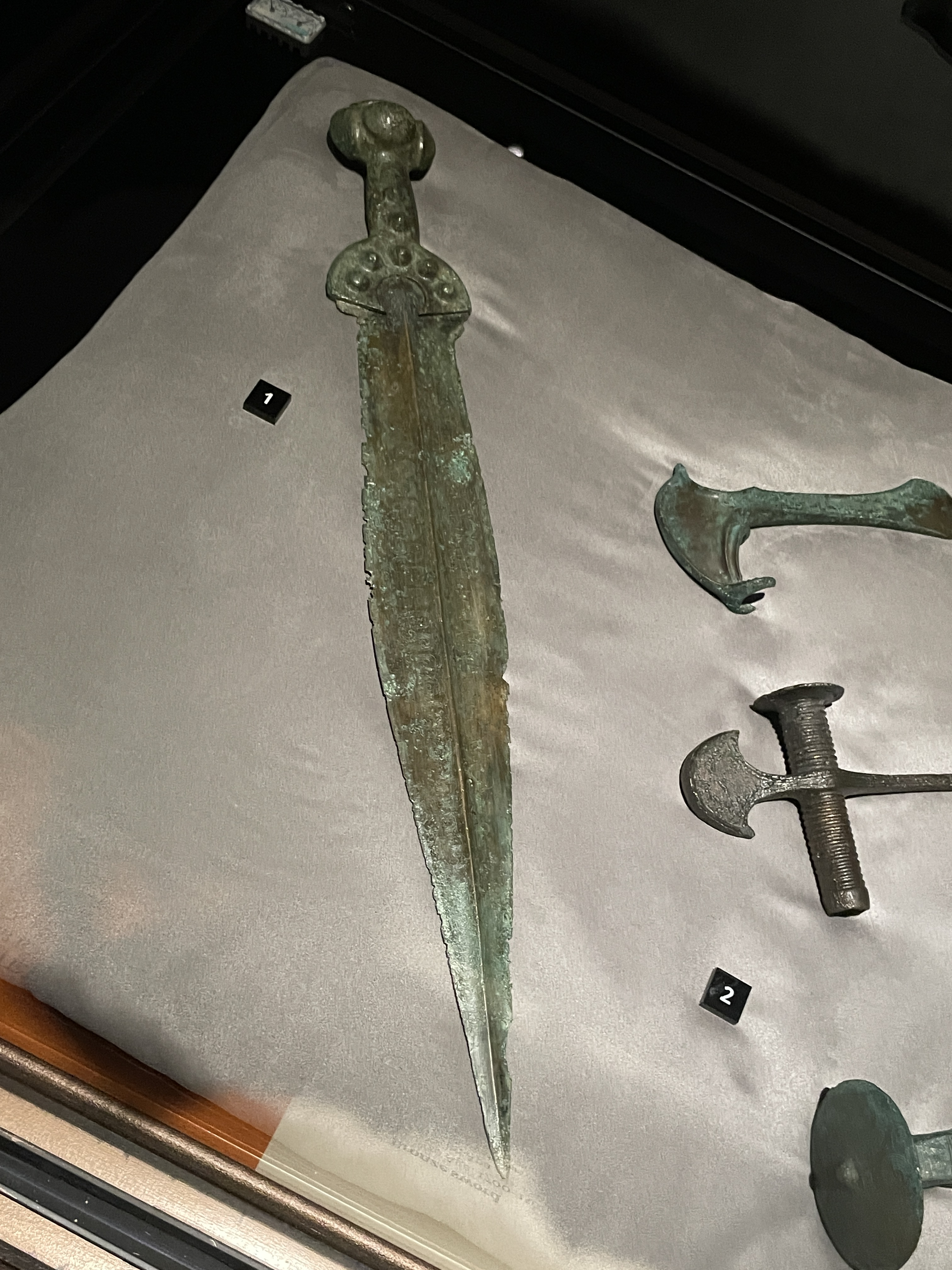
Bronze sword, Wietenberg culture, Romania, c. 1700 BC

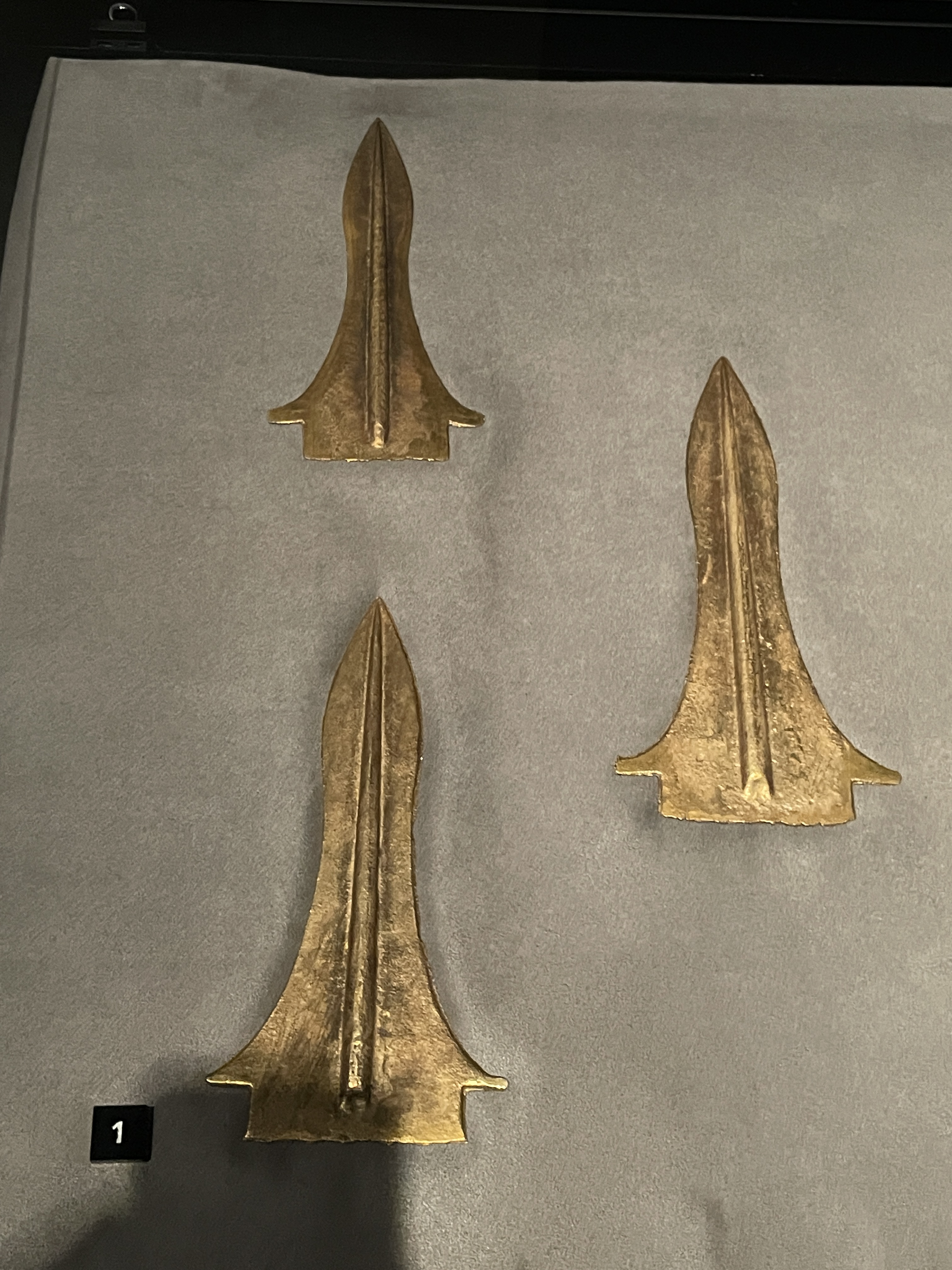
Gold daggers, Tei culture, Romania, 1700-1600 BC

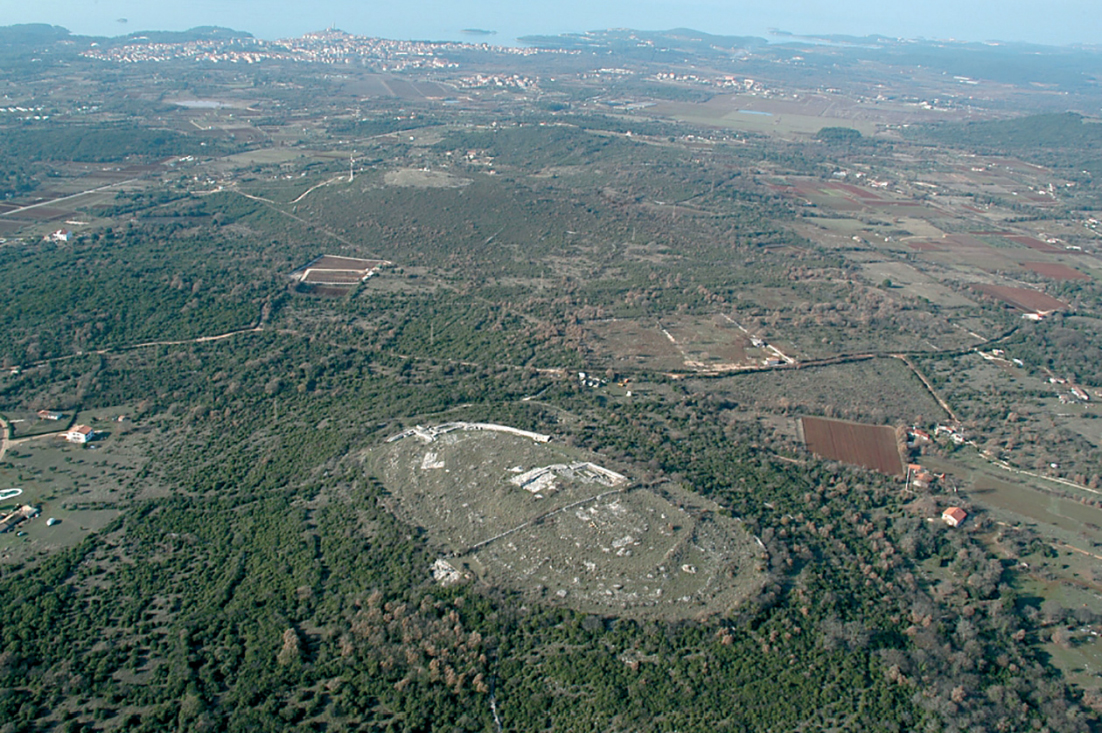
Monkodonja hillfort, Castellieri culture, Croatia, c. 1500 BC

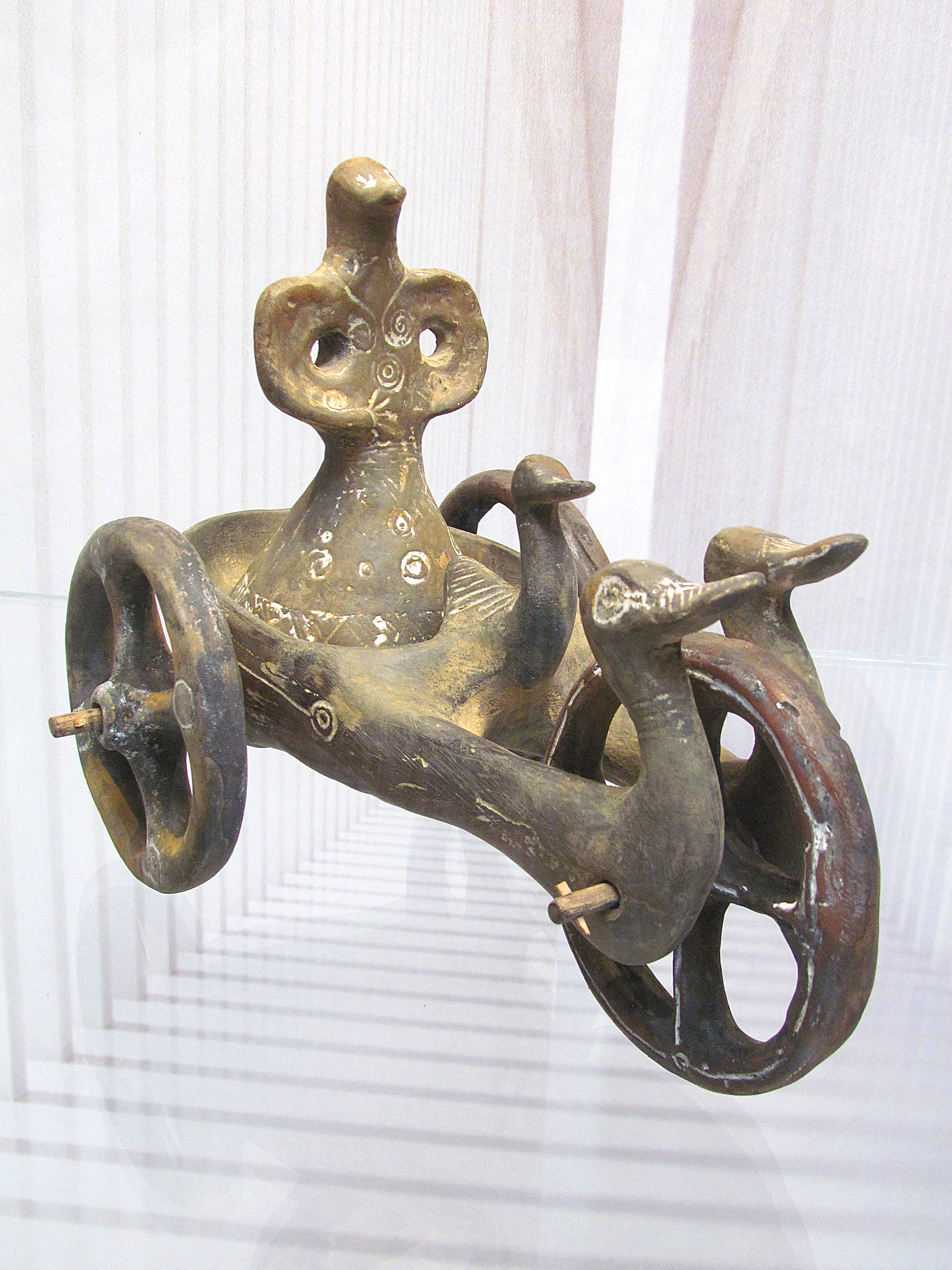
Dupljaja chariot, Dubovac culture, Serbia, c. 1300 BC

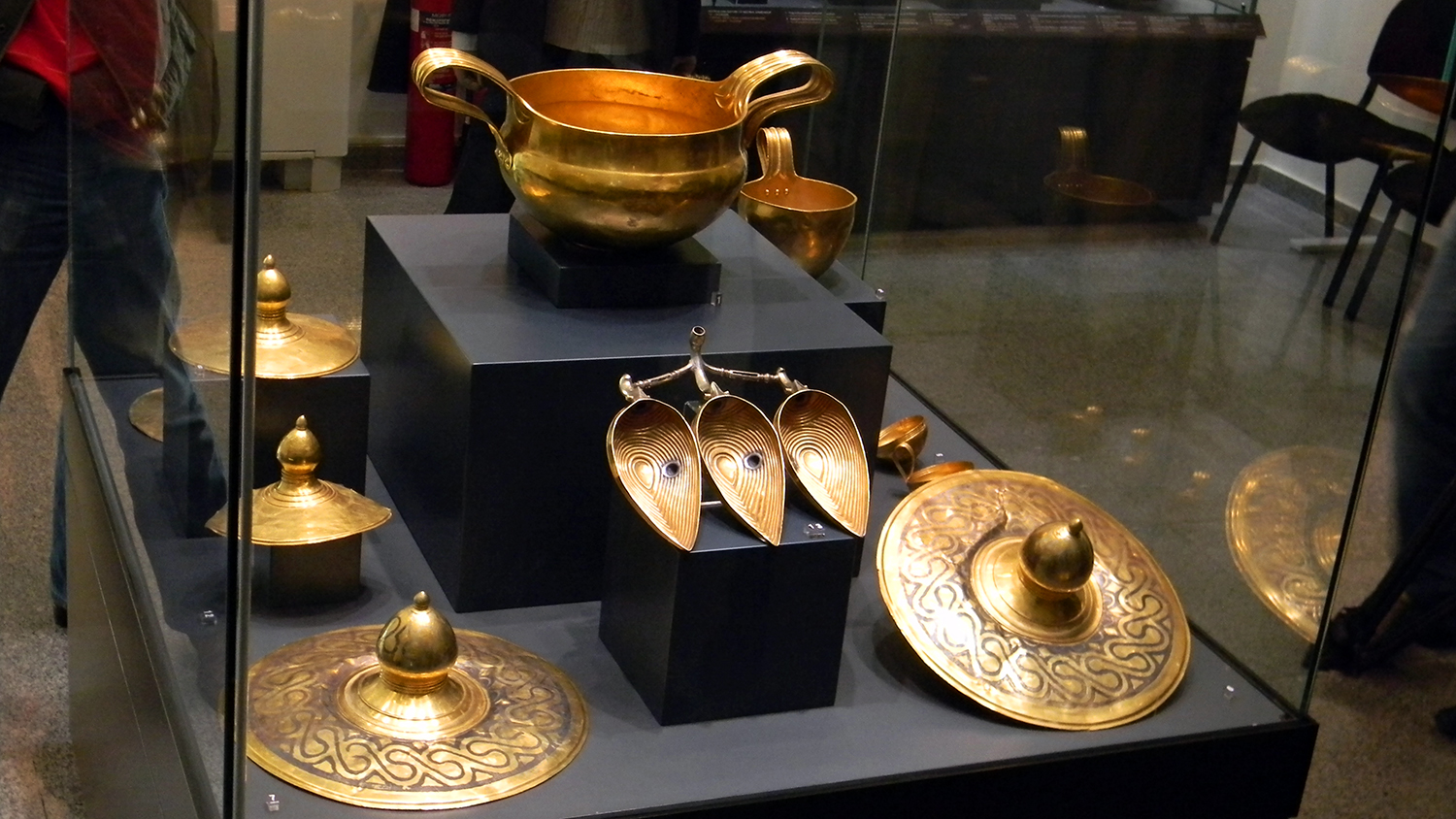
Valchitran Treasure, Bulgaria, c. 1300 BC

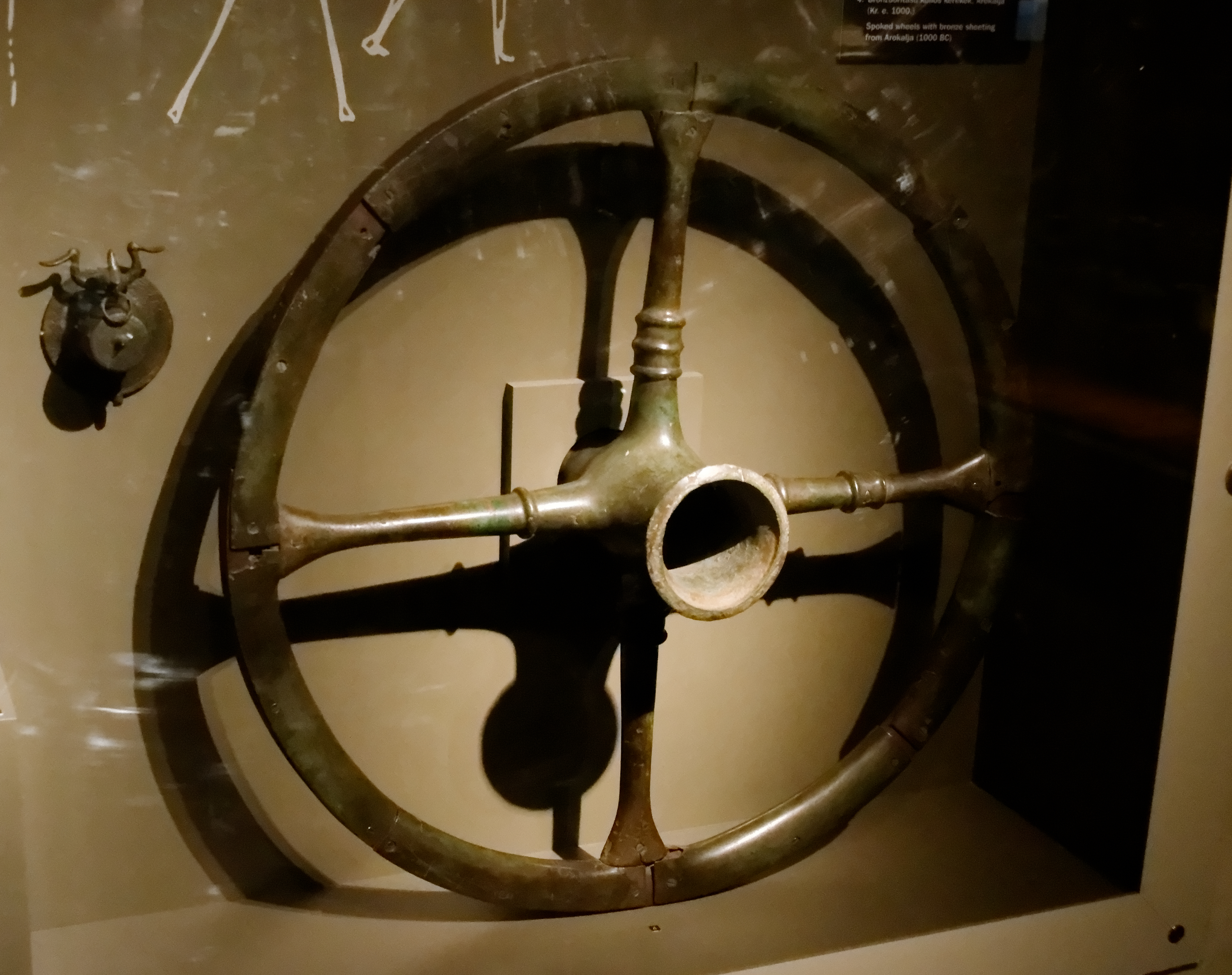
Bronze chariot wheel, Urnfield culture, Romania, c. 1200 BC

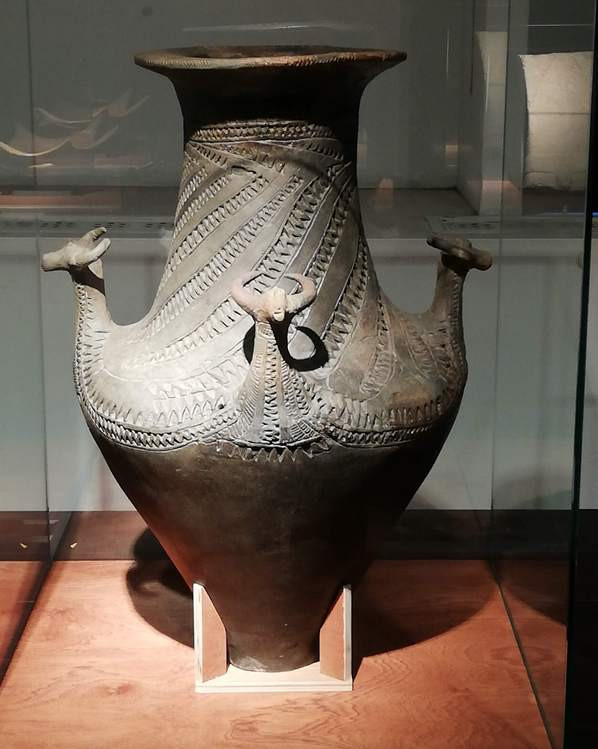
Pottery, Urnfield culture, Romania, 13th century BC

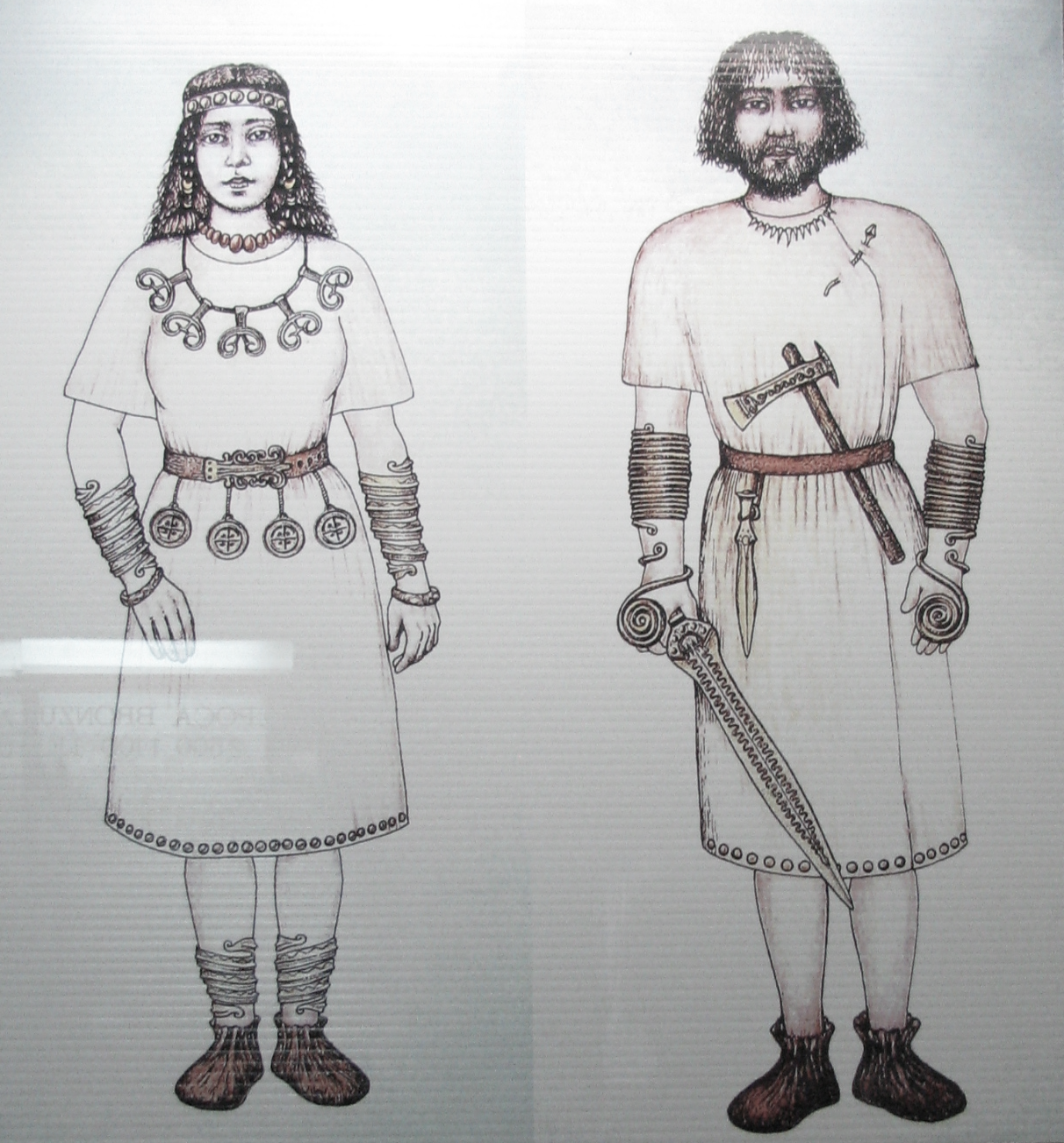
Wietenburg culture, c. 1700 BC

=== Eastern Europe ===
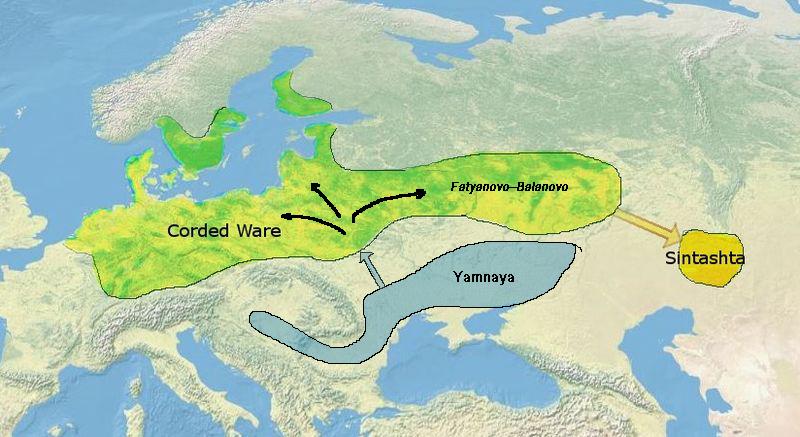
Corded Ware, Yamnaya and Sintashta cultures

The Maykop culture was the major early Bronze Age culture in the North Caucasus. Some scholars date arsenical bronze artifacts in the region as far back as the mid-4th millennium BC.

The Yamnaya culture (Note: Also known as Pit Grave culture or Ochre Grave culture) was a late copper age/early Bronze Age culture dating to the 36th–23rd centuries BC. The culture was predominantly nomadic, with some agriculture practiced near rivers and a few hill-forts.

The Catacomb culture, covering several related archaeological cultures, was first to introduce corded pottery decorations into the steppes and showed a profuse use of the polished battle ax, providing a link to the West. Parallels with the Afanasevo culture, including provoked cranial deformations, provide a link to the East. It was preceded by the Yamnaya culture and succeeded by the western Corded Ware culture. The eastern Corded Ware culture (Fatyanovo–Balanovo culture) gave rise to the Abashevo culture, followed by the Sintashta culture, where the earliest known spoked-wheel chariots have been found, dating from c. 2000 BC. The Catacomb culture in the Pontic steppe was succeeded by the Multi-cordoned Ware culture, and the Srubnaya culture from c. the 17th century BC.

Bronze Age archaeological cultures in Eastern Europe:

- Maykop culture
- Usatove culture
- Yamnaya culture
- Catacomb culture
- Fatyanovo–Balanovo culture
- Poltavka culture
- Abashevo culture
- Potapovka culture
- Sintashta culture
- Andronovo culture
- Srubnaya culture
- Novosvobodnaya culture
- Multi-cordoned ware culture
- Trzciniec culture
- Seima-Turbino culture
- Dolmen culture
- Trialeti culture
- Koban culture
- Noua-Sabatinovka-Coslogeni culture
- Monteoru culture
- Gáva-Holigrady culture
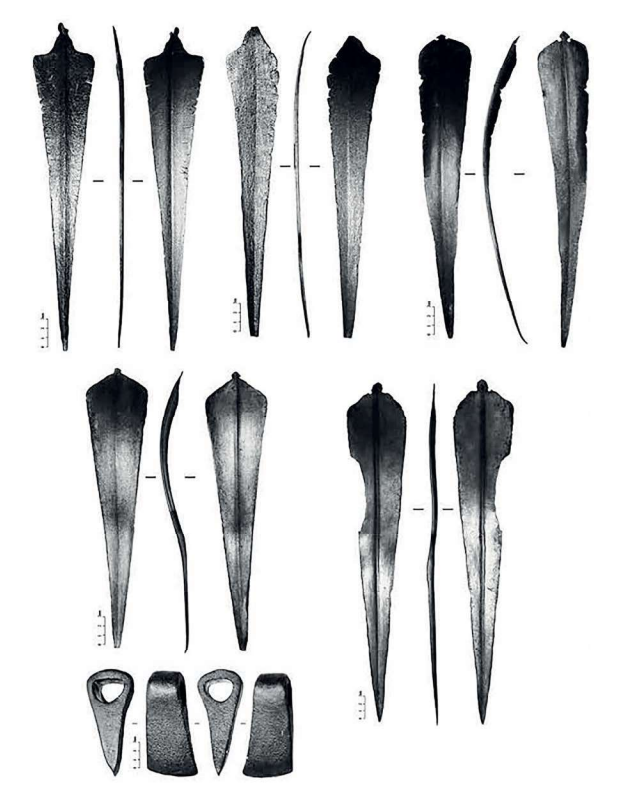
Arsenical bronze daggers, Usatove culture, c. 3000 BC

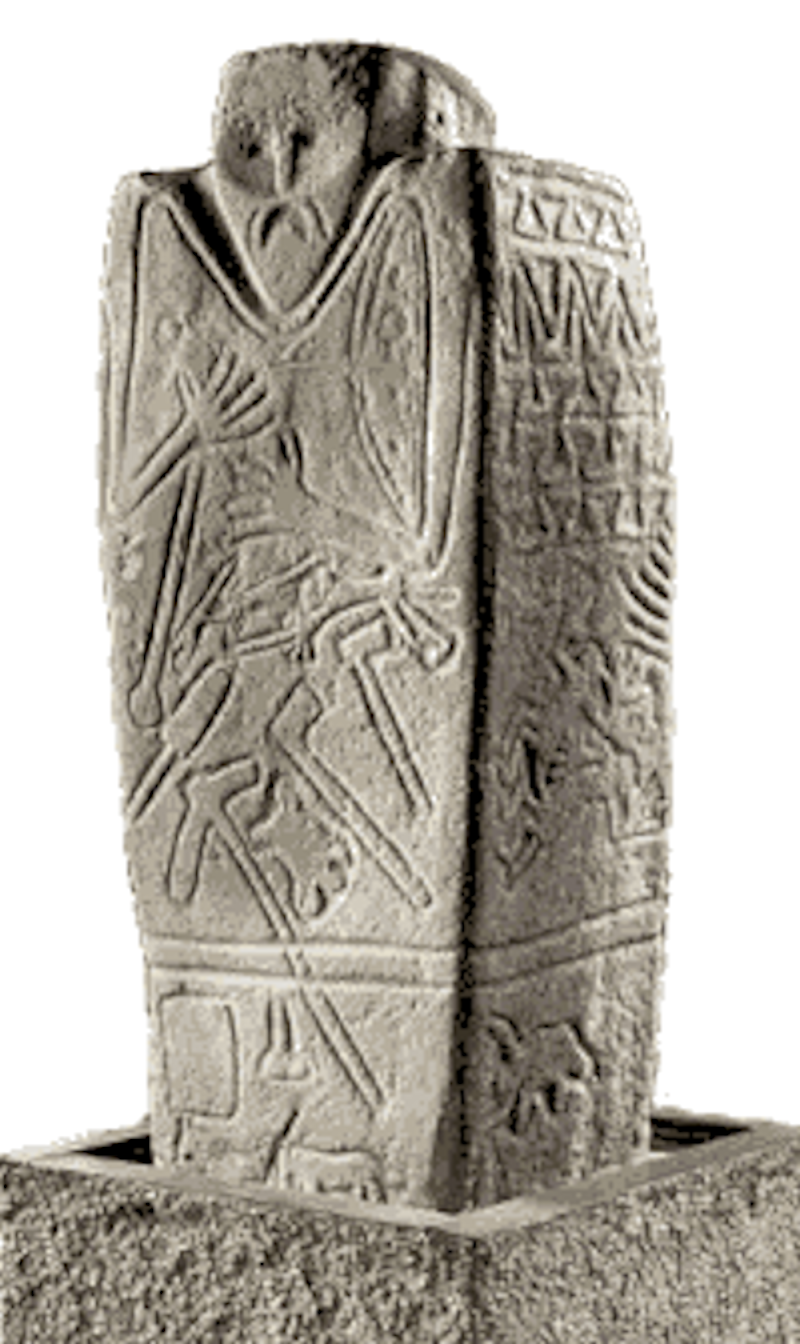
Kernosivsky idol, Yamnaya culture, Ukraine, c. 2600 BC

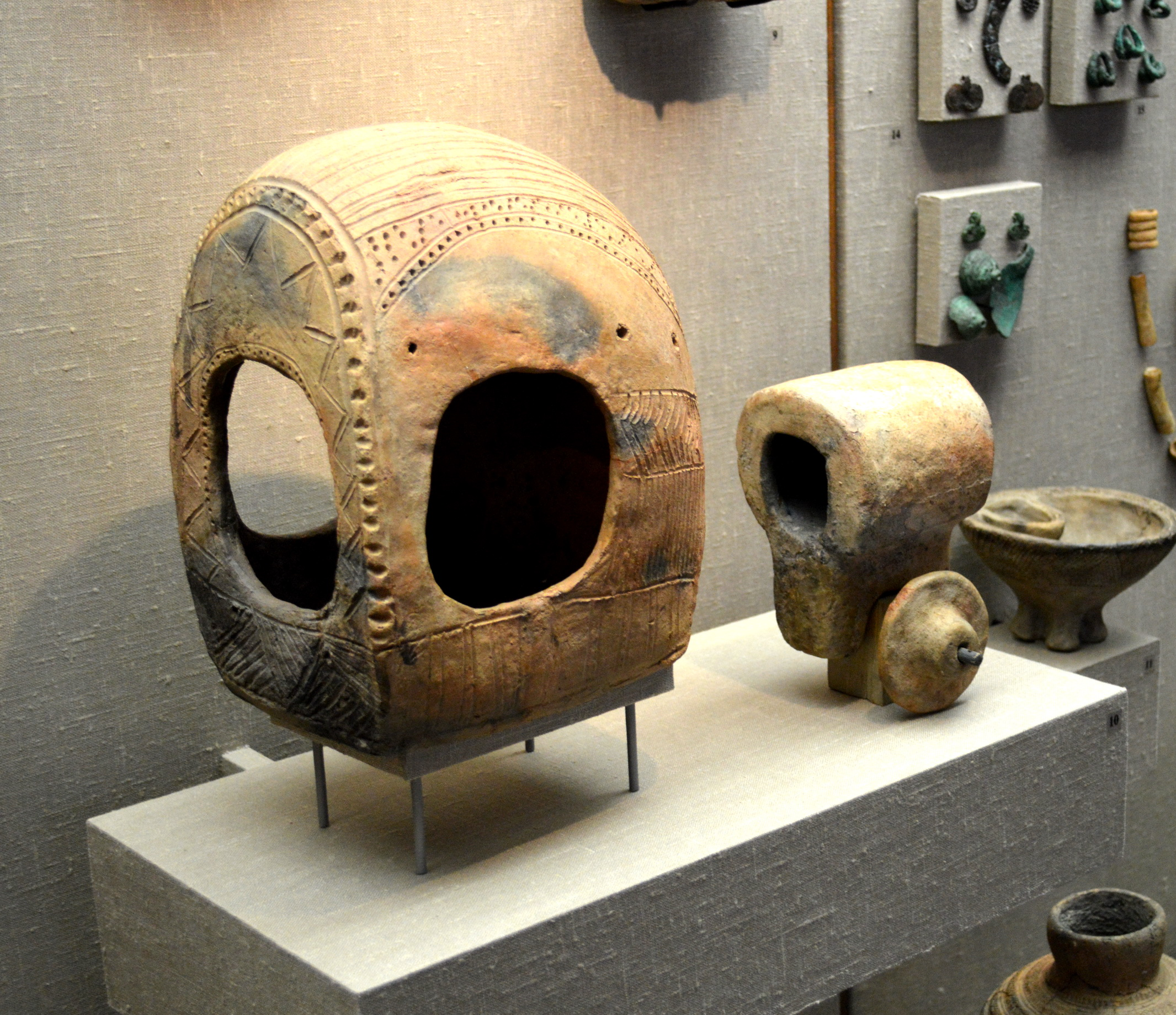
Wagon models, Catacomb culture, Russia, c. 2100 BC

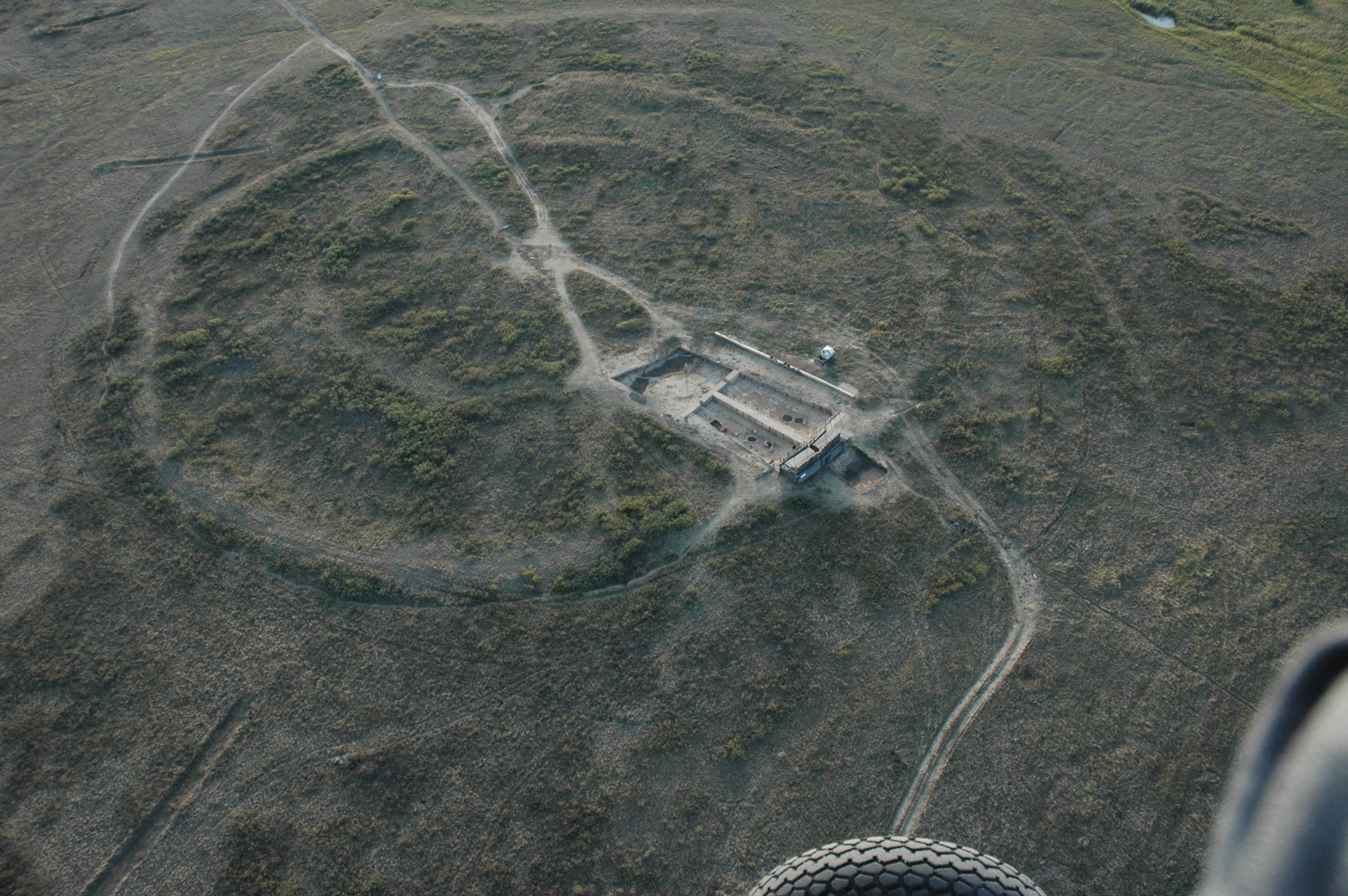
Arkaim fortress, Sintashta culture, Russia, c. 2000 BC

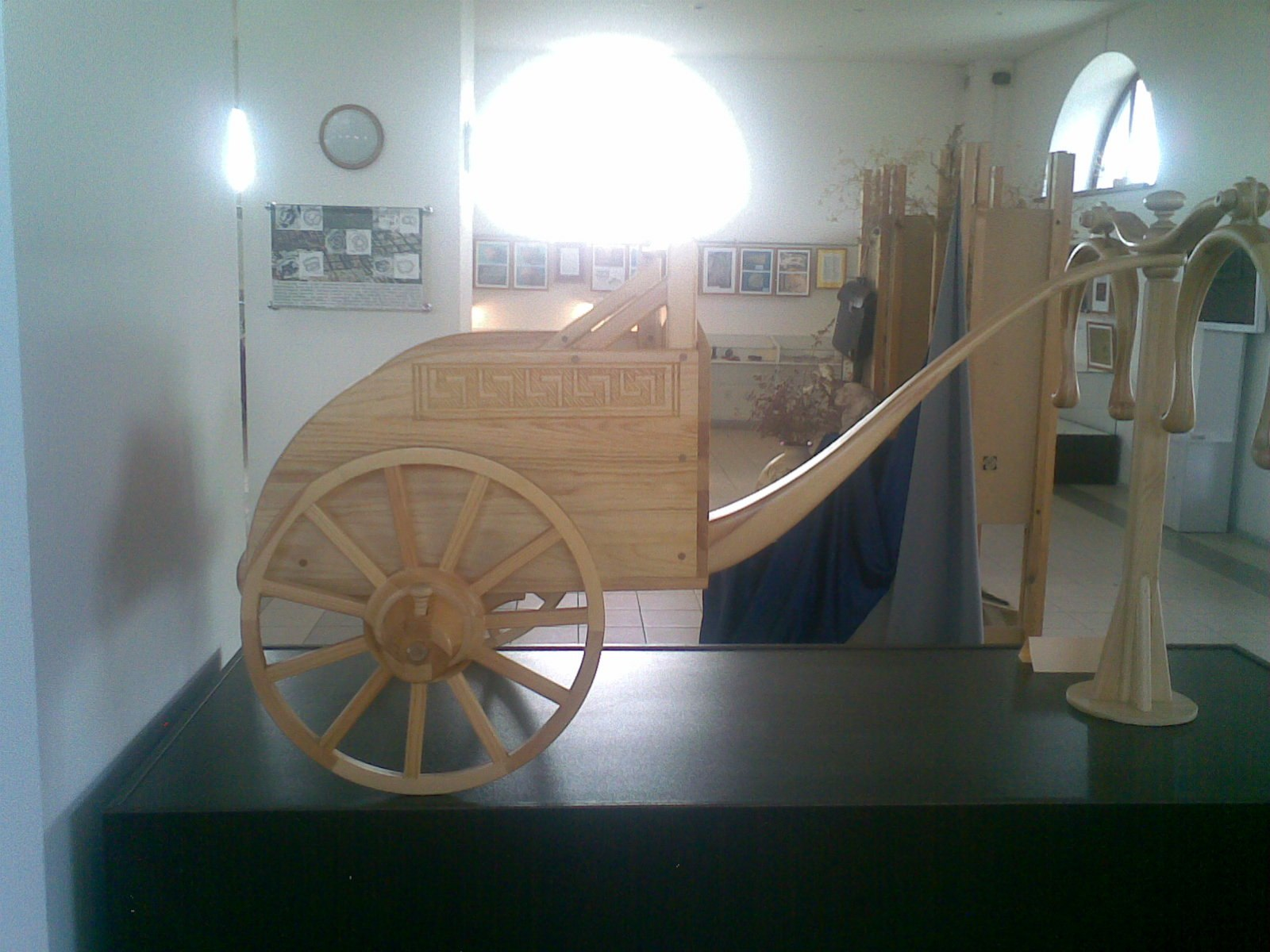
Model of an early chariot, Sintashta culture

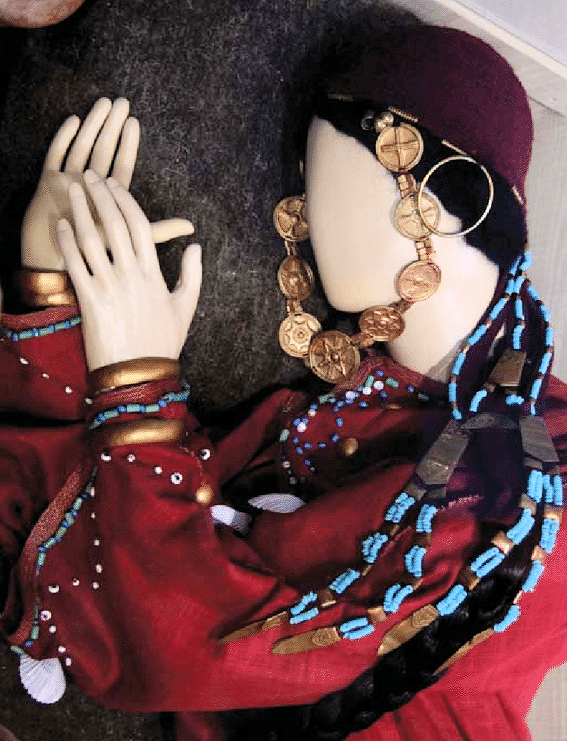
Reconstructed clothing and jewellery, c. 2000 BC

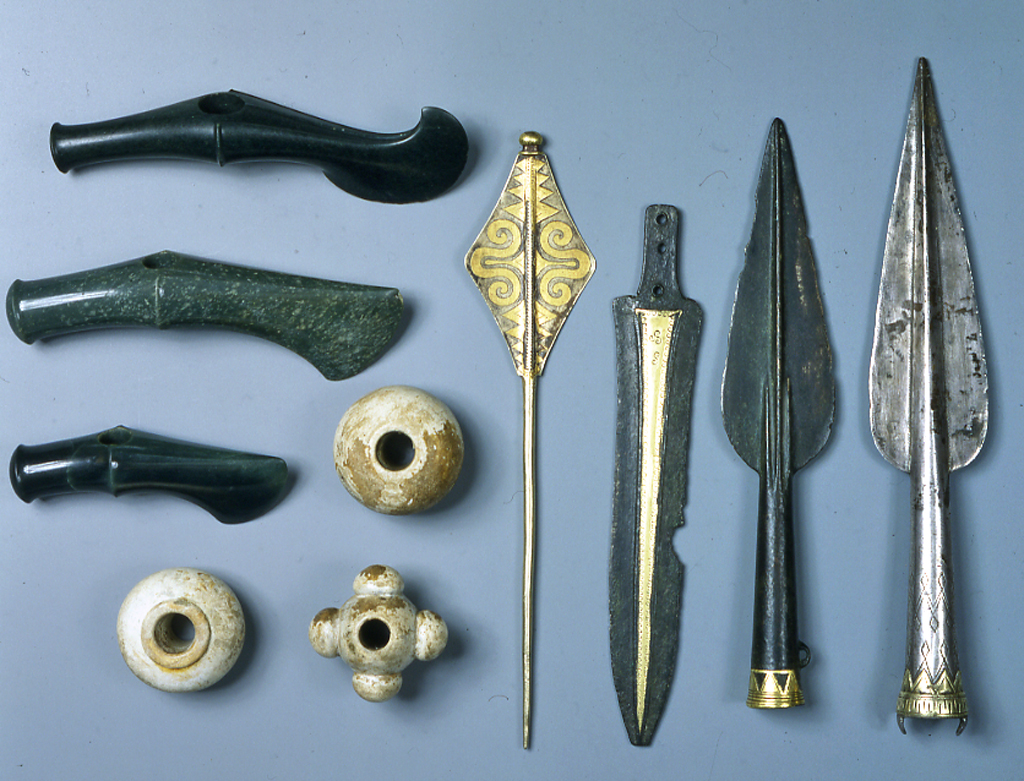
Borodino treasure, Seima-Turbino culture, Moldova, c. 1700 BC

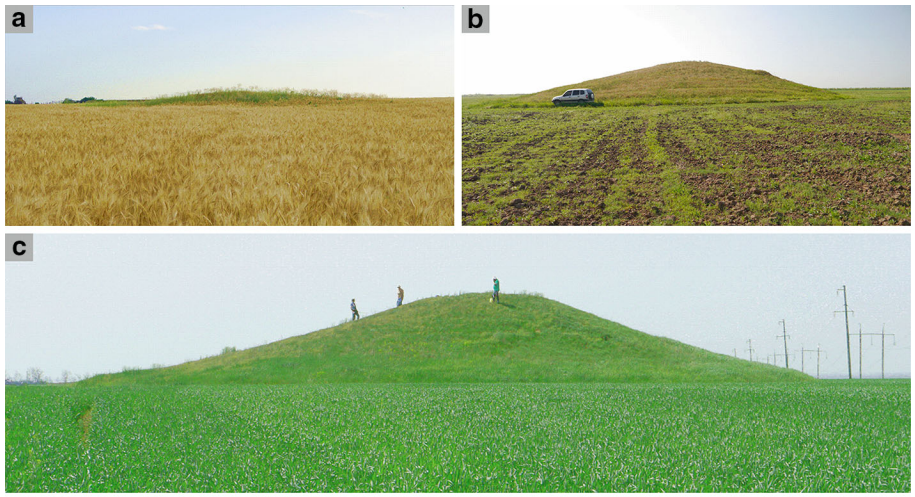
Burial mounds in Ukraine

=== Central Europe ===
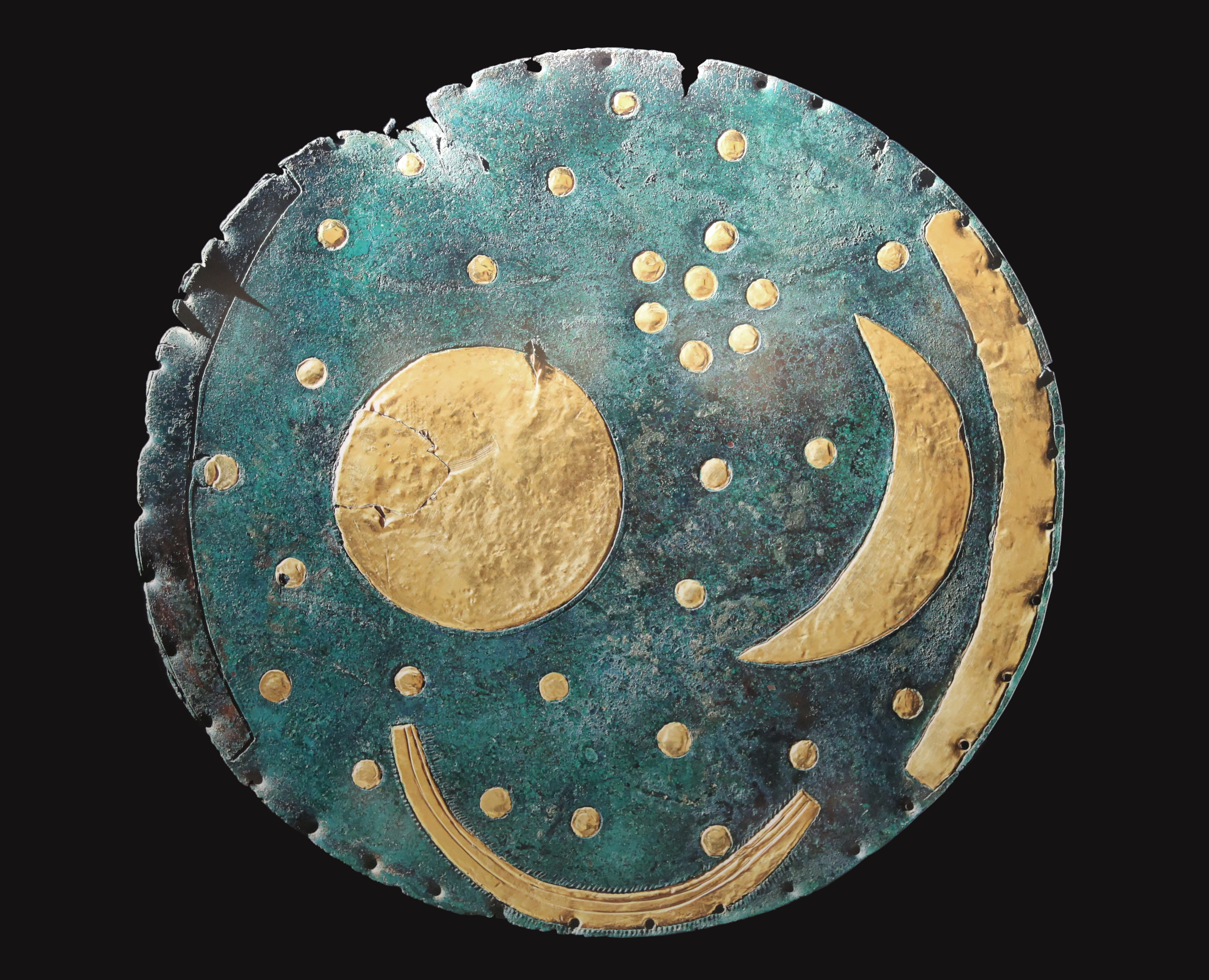
Nebra sky disk, Únětice culture, Germany, c. 1800 BC

In Central Europe, the early Bronze Age Únětice culture (2300–1600 BC) includes numerous smaller groups like the Straubing, Adlerberg and Hatvan cultures. Some very rich burials, such as the one located at Leubingen (today part of Sömmerda) with grave gifts crafted from gold, point to an increase of social stratification already present in the Únětice culture. All in all, cemeteries of this period are rare and of small size. The Únětice culture is followed by the middle Bronze Age (1600–1200 BC) Tumulus culture, which is characterized by inhumation burials in tumuli (barrows). In the eastern Hungarian Körös tributaries, the early Bronze Age first saw the introduction of the Makó culture, followed by the Ottomány culture and Gyulavarsánd culture.

The late Bronze Age Urnfield culture (1300–750 BC) is characterized by cremation burials. It includes the Lusatian culture in eastern Germany and Poland (1300–500 BC) that continues into the Iron Age. The Central European Bronze Age is followed by the Iron Age Hallstatt culture (800–450 BC).

Important sites include: Biskupin (Poland), Nebra (Germany), Zug-Sumpf, Zug (Switzerland), and Vráble (Slovakia).

Bronze Age archaeological cultures in Central Europe include:

- Vučedol culture
- Bell Beaker culture
- Únětice culture
- Ottomány culture
- Rhône culture
- Mierzanowice culture
- Hatvan culture
- Nagyrév culture
- Nitra culture
- Mad'arovce culture
- Trzciniec culture
- Tumulus culture
- Vatya culture
- Encrusted Pottery culture
- Urnfield culture
- Lusatian culture
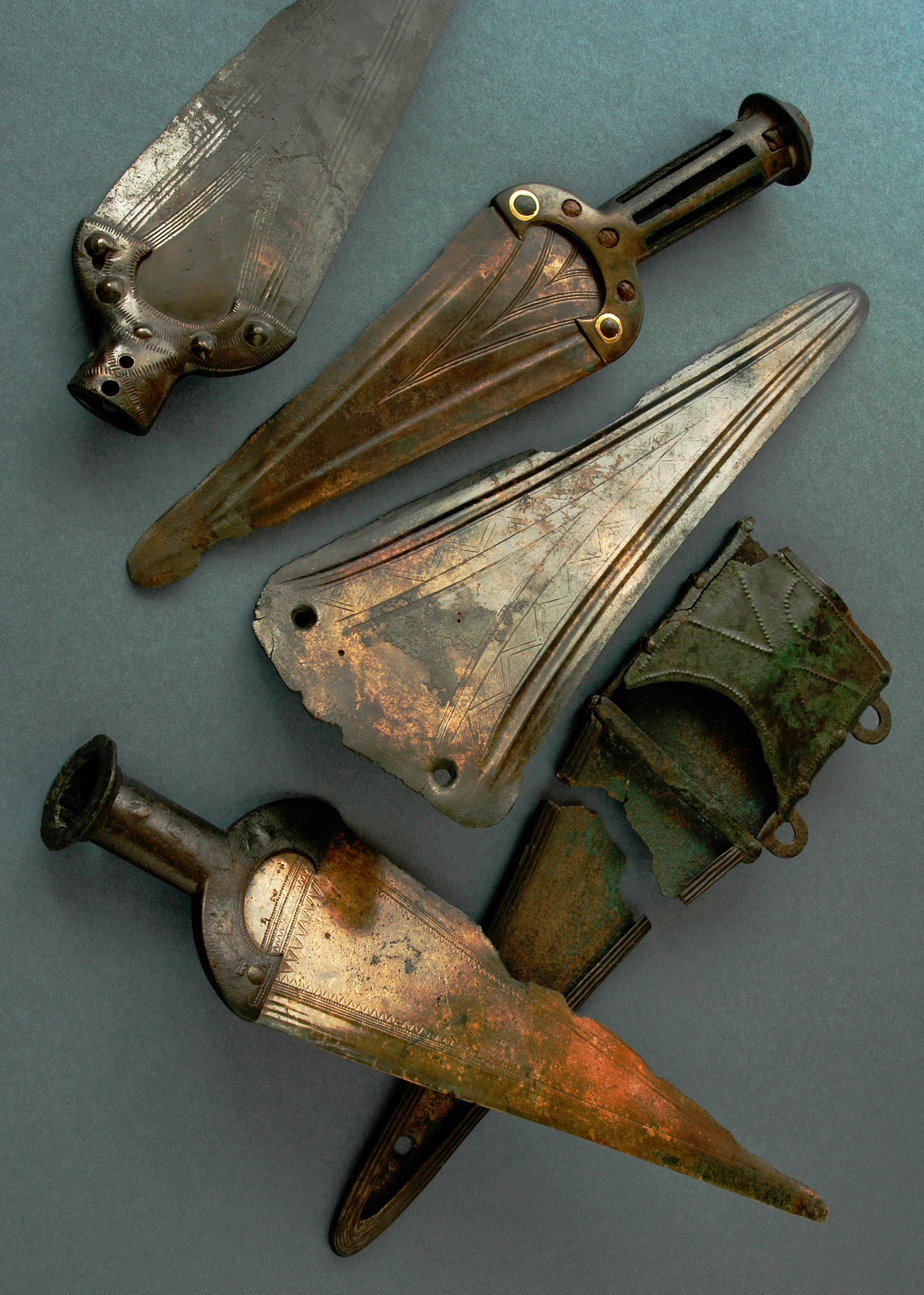
Bronze daggers, Únětice culture, Czech Republic, c. 2000 BC

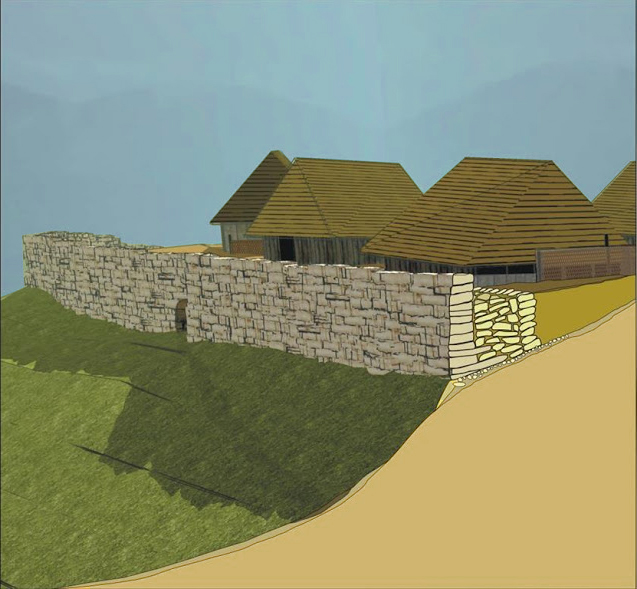
Góra Zyndrama, Ottomány culture, Poland, 1750 BC

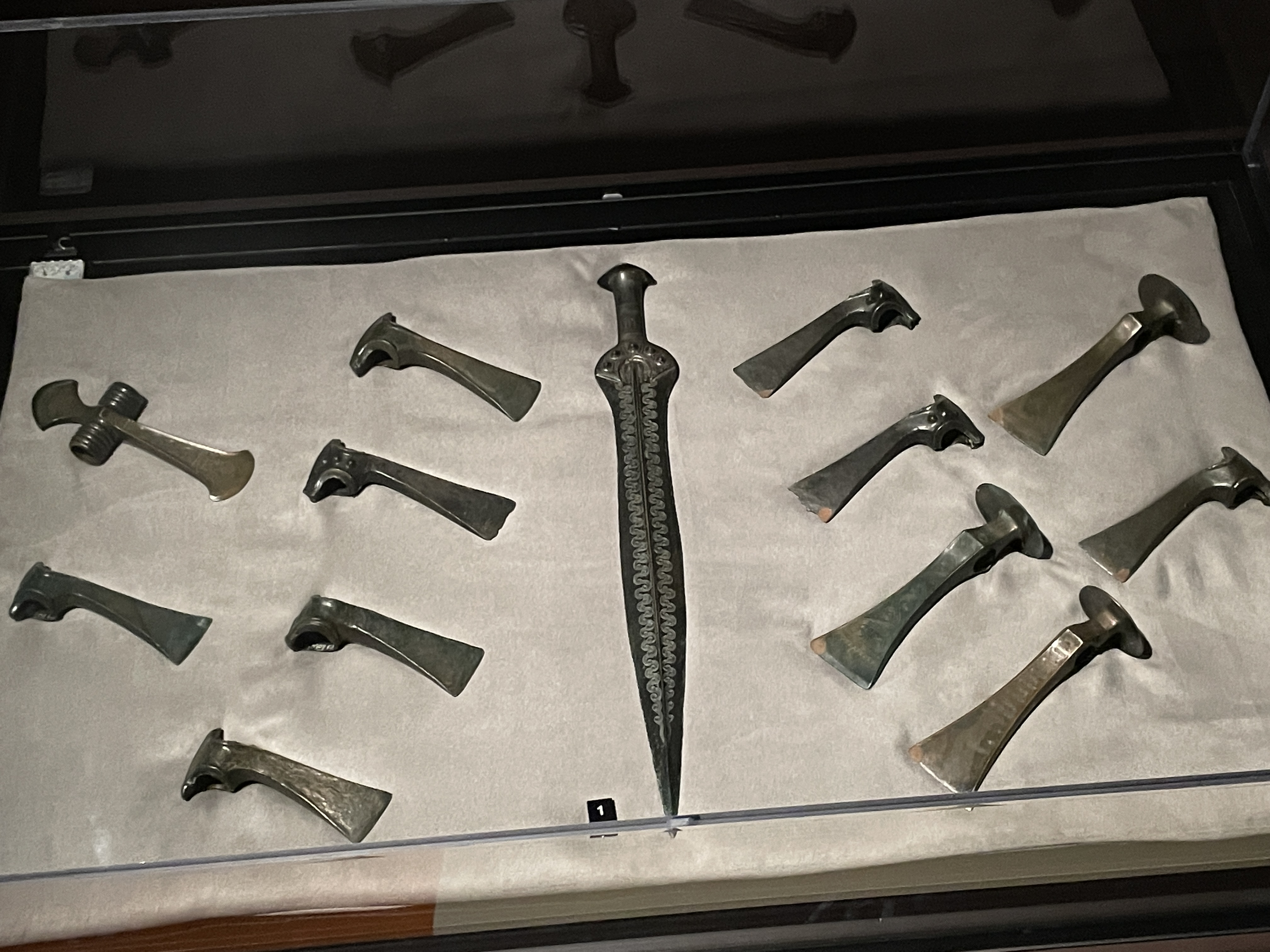
Hajdúsámson Hoard, Ottomány culture, Hungary, c. 1700 BC

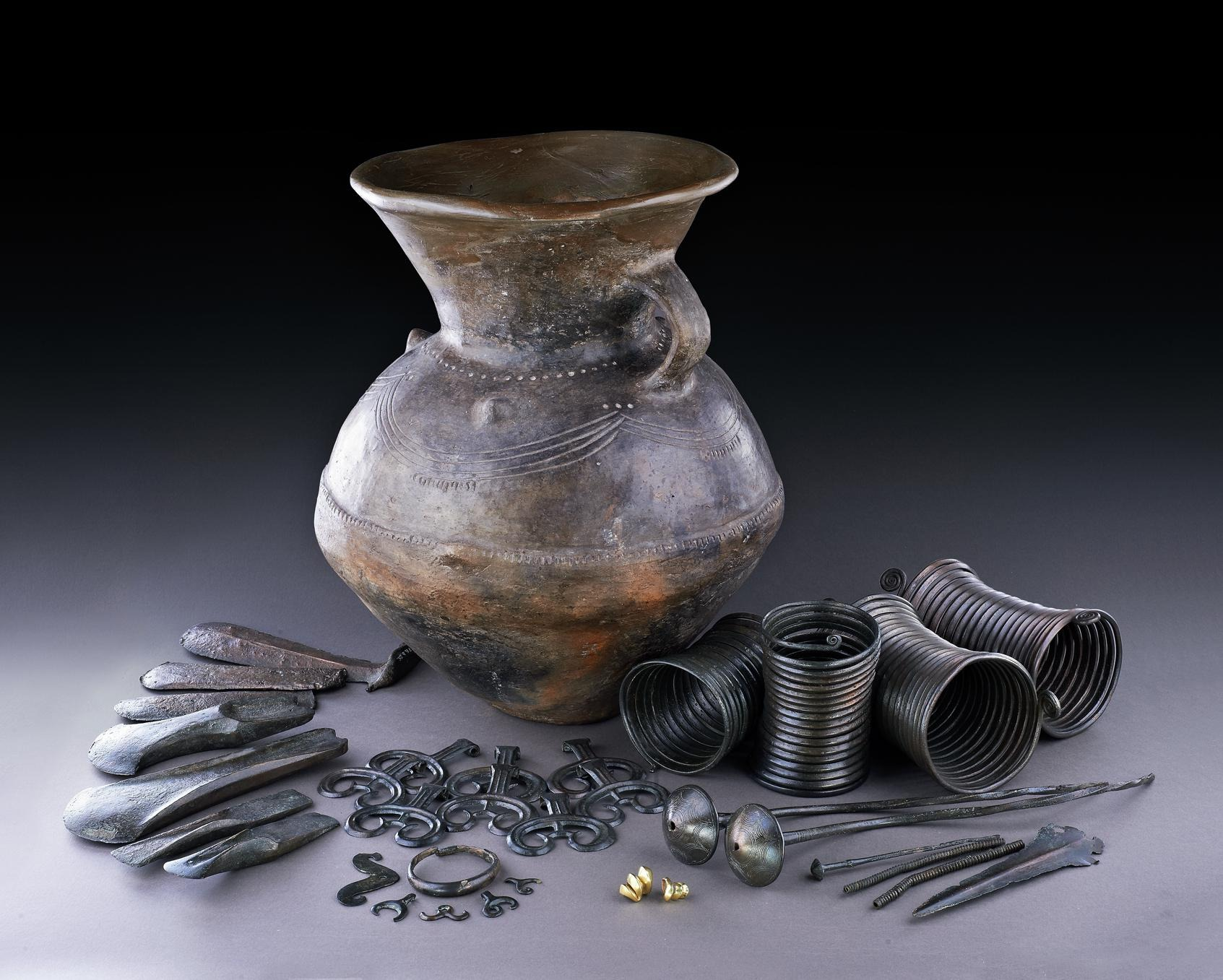
Vatya culture hoard, Hungary, 1700-1500 BC

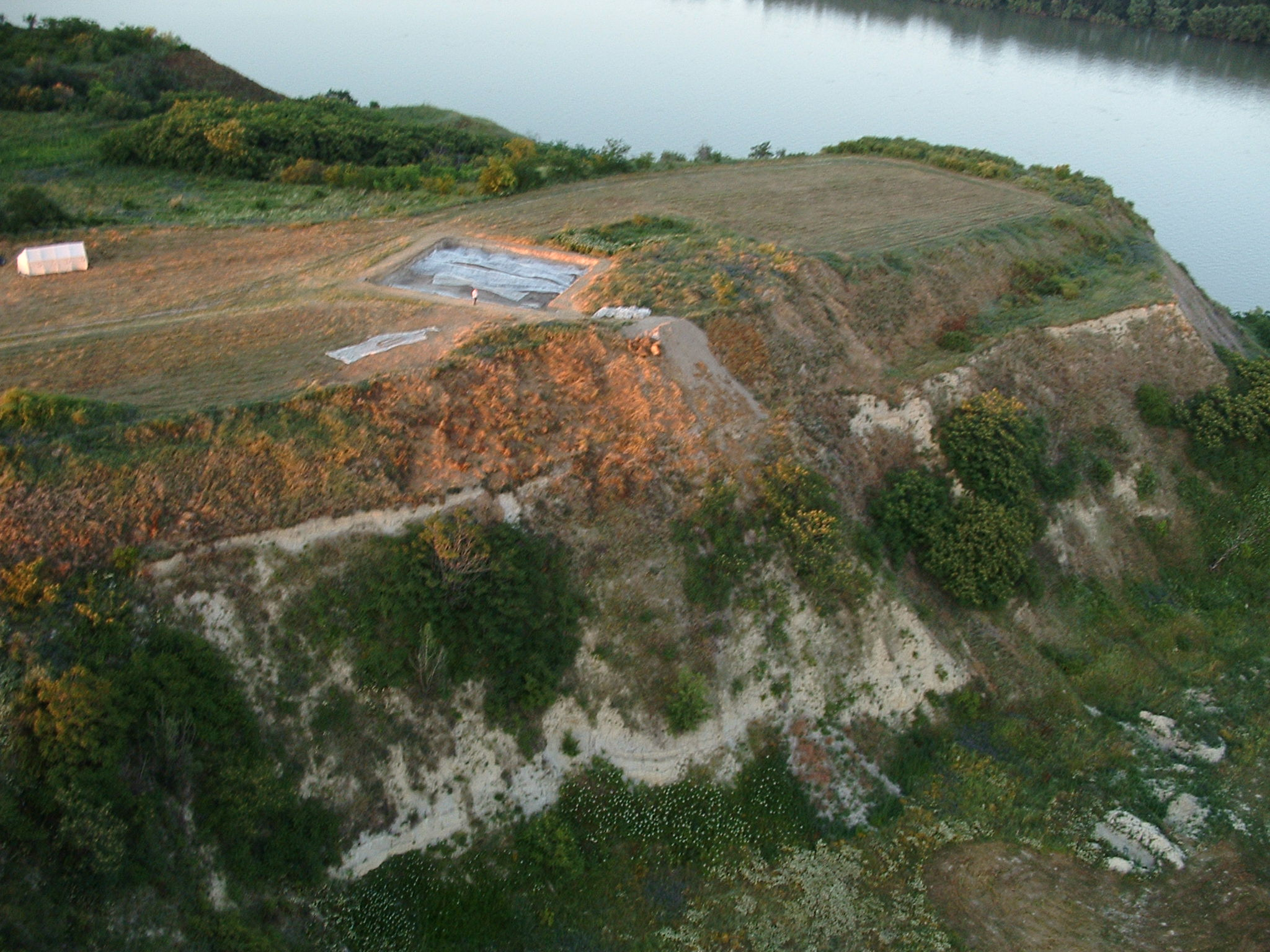
Százhalombatta-Földvár hillfort, Vatya culture, Hungary, 2000-1400 BC

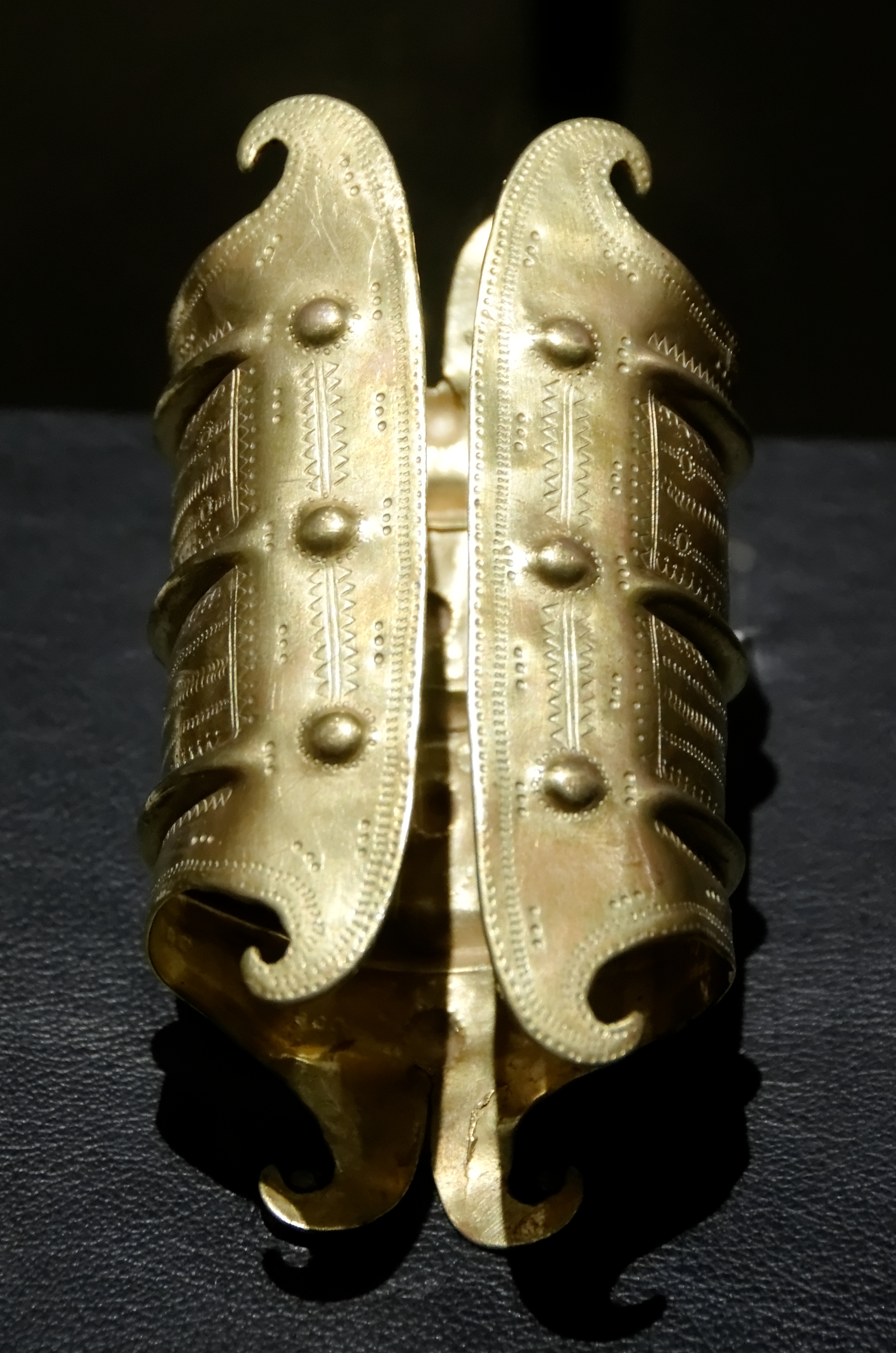
Gold bracelet, Vatya culture, Hungary, c. 1500 BC

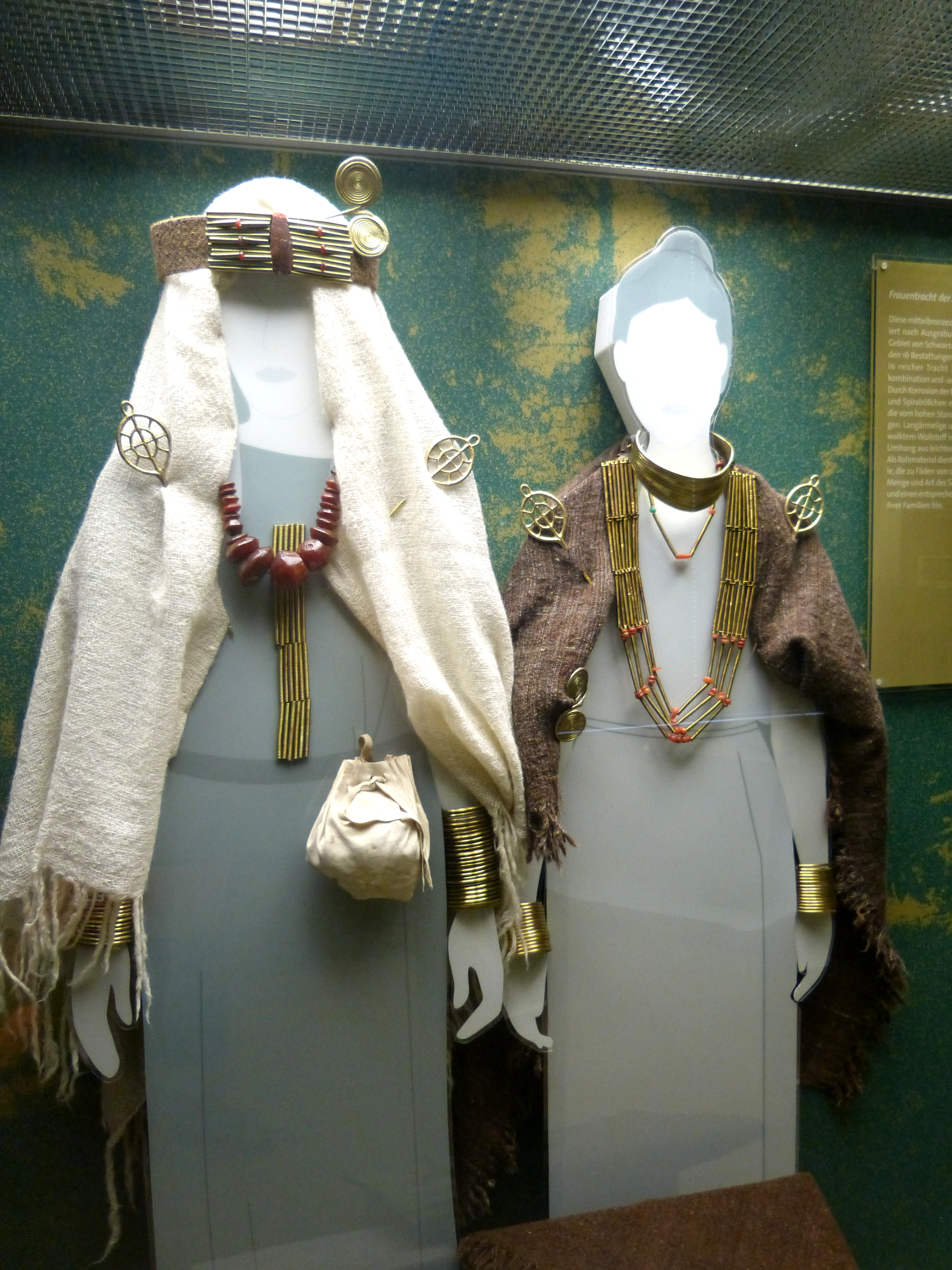
Reconstructed clothing, Tumulus culture, Germany, c. 1500 BC

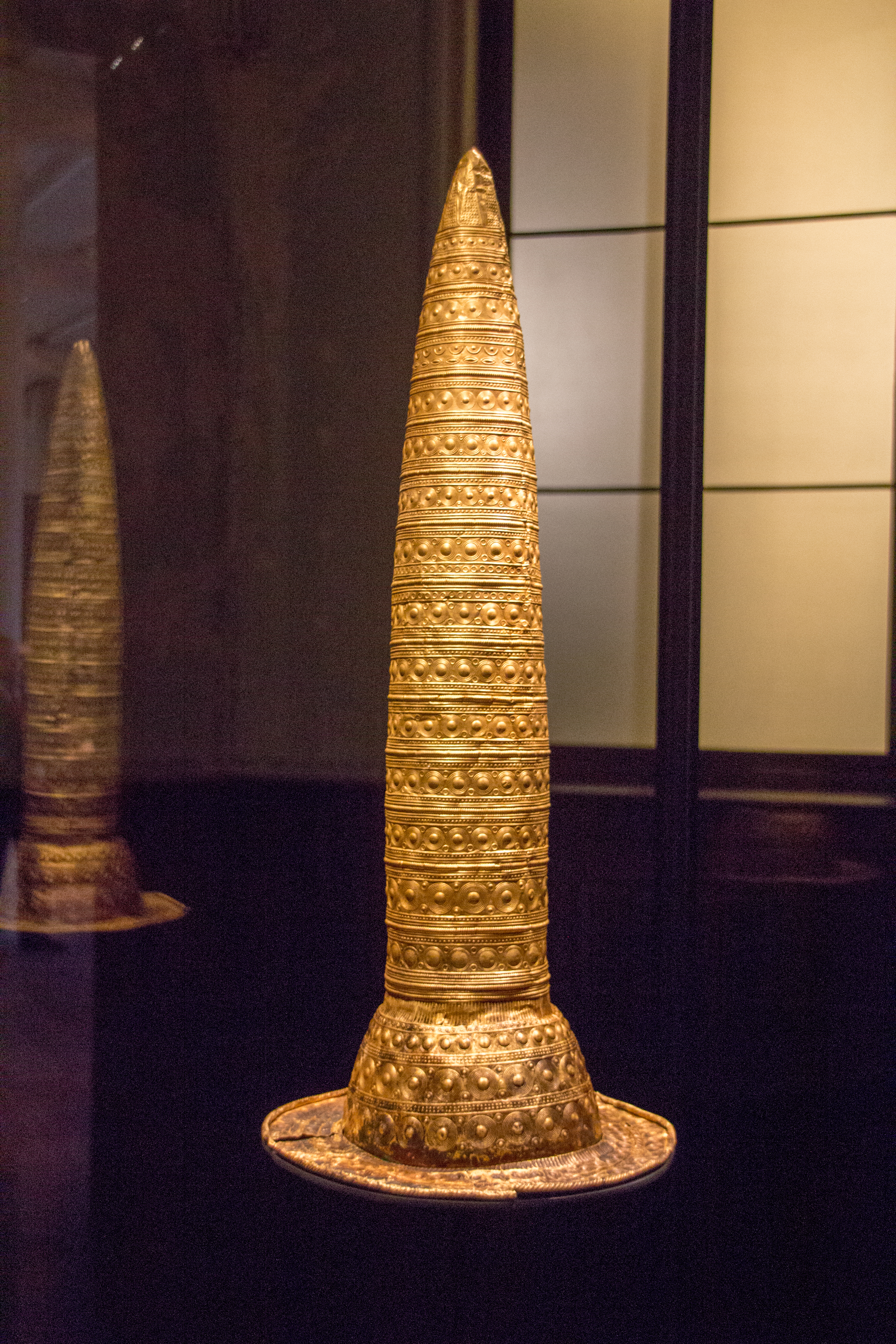
Berlin Gold Hat, Urnfield culture, Germany, c. 1000 BC

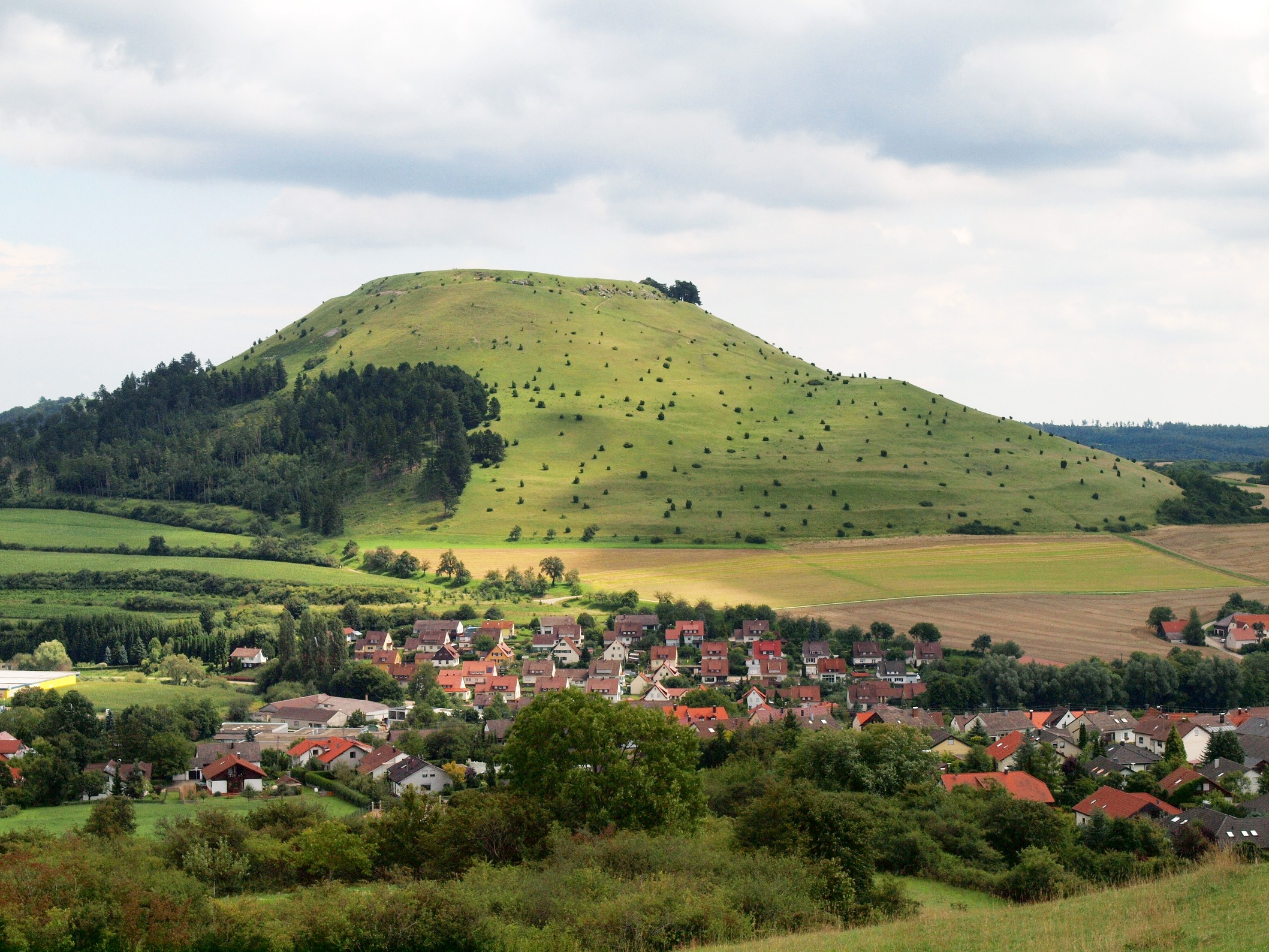
Ipf hillfort, Urnfield culture, Germany, c. 1200 BC

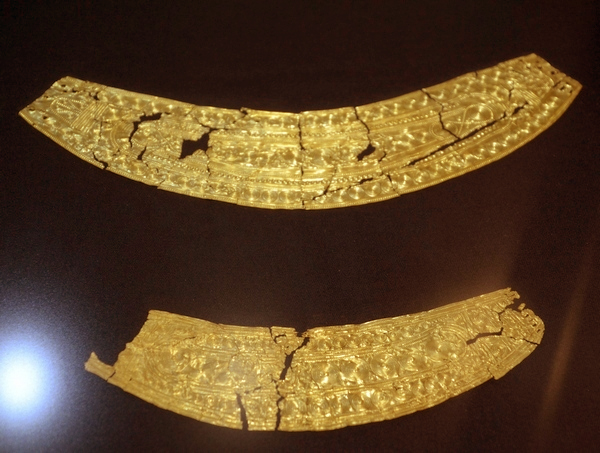
Gold collar, Urnfield culture, Slovenia, 13th century BC

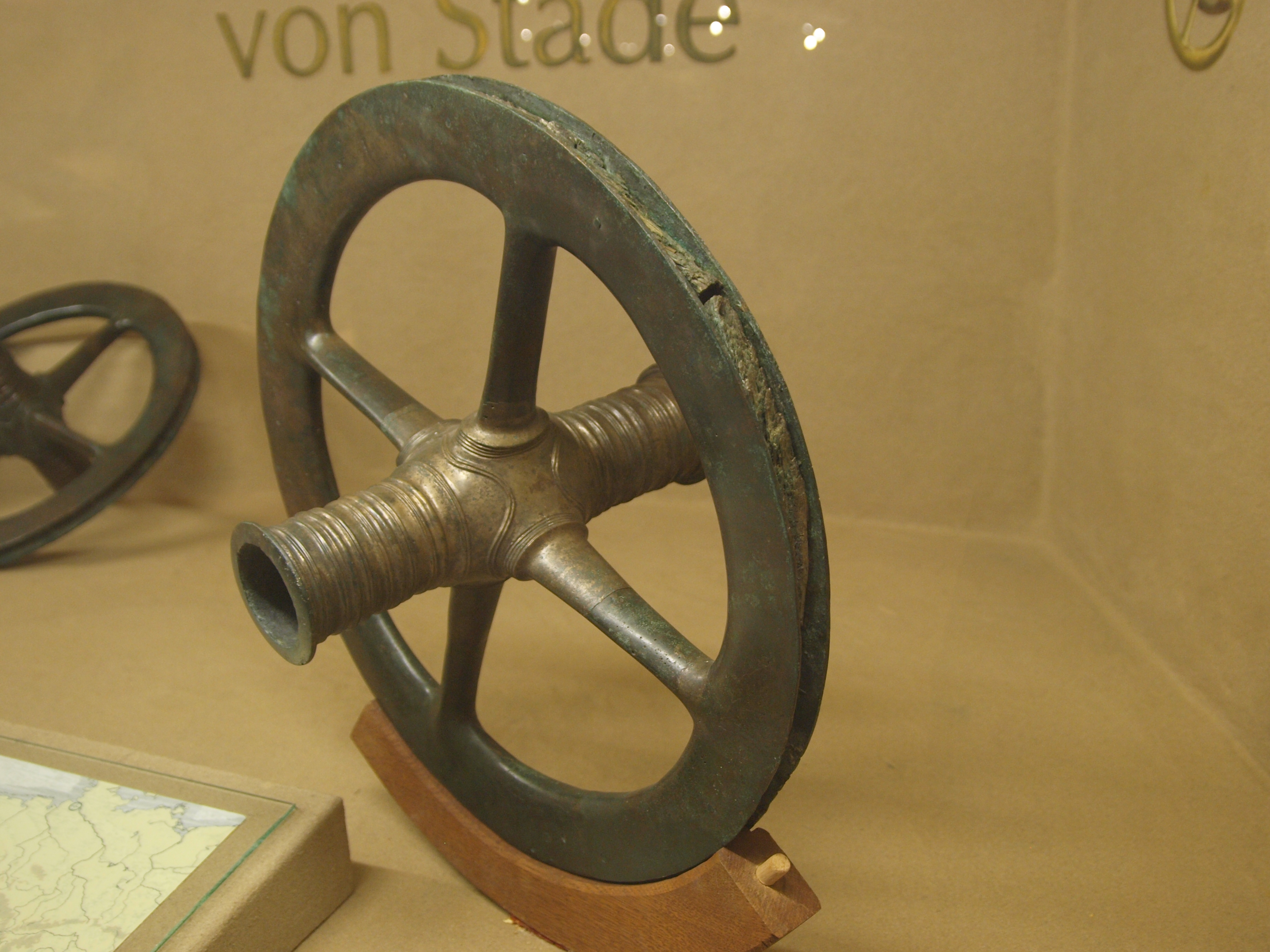
Bronze wheel, Urnfield culture, Germany, c. 1000 BC

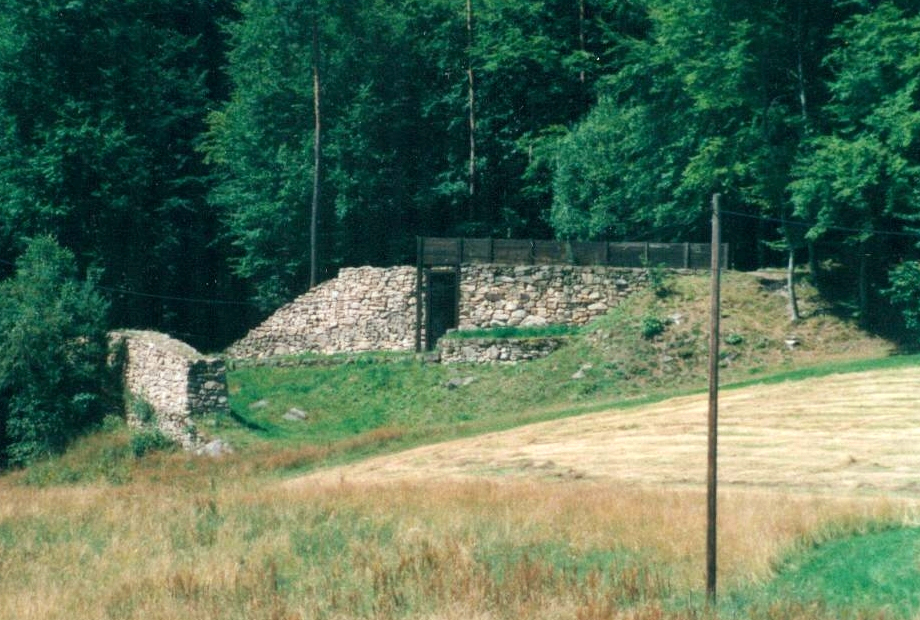
Heunischenburg, Urnfield culture, Germany, c. 1000 BC

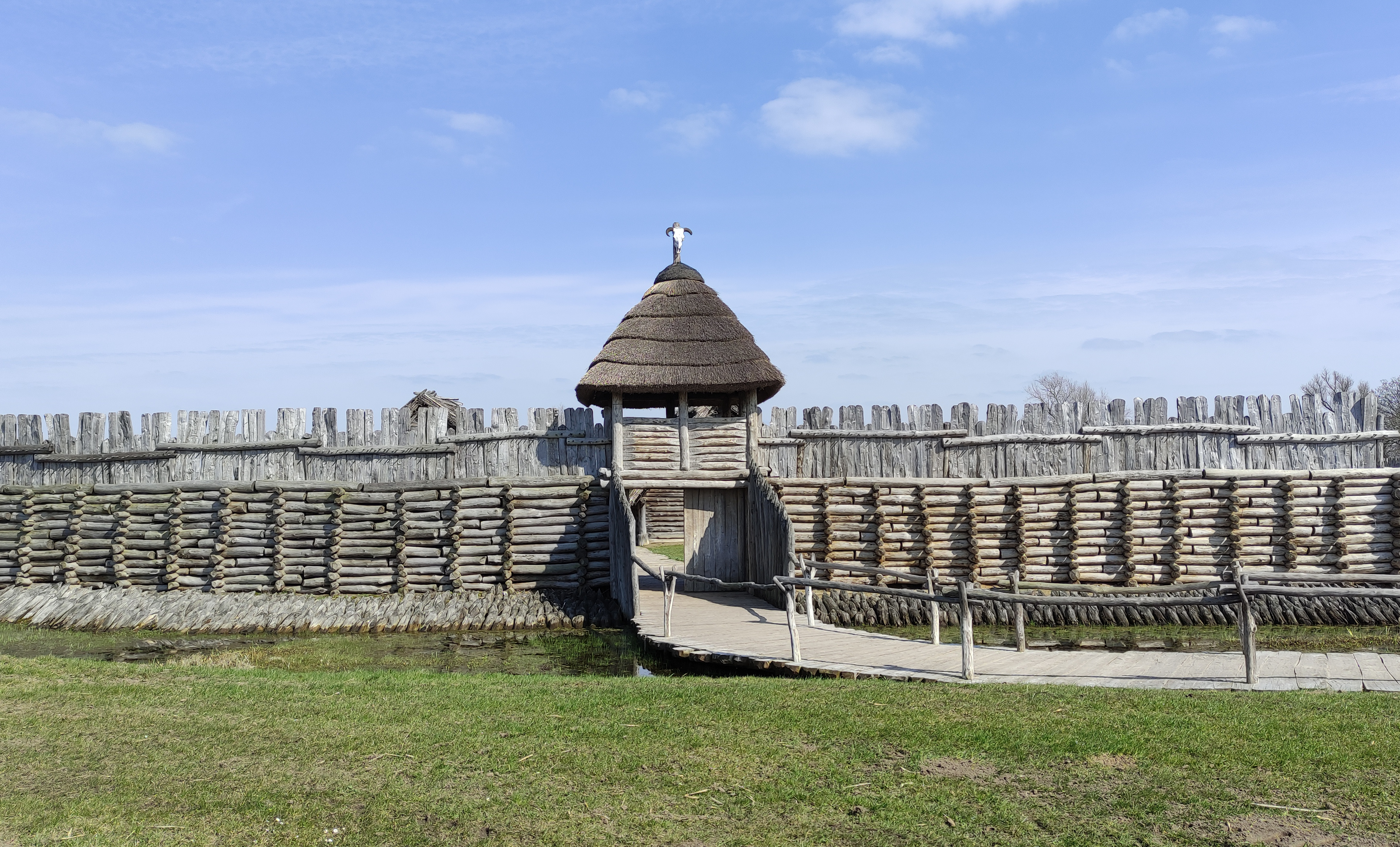
Biskupin fortified settlement, Lusatian culture, Poland

=== Italy ===
The Italian Bronze Age is conditionally divided into four periods: The Early Bronze Age (2300–1700 BC), the Middle Bronze Age (1700–1350 BC), the Recent Bronze Age (1350–1150 BC), the Final Bronze Age (1150–950 BC).

The Early Bronze Age shows the beginning of a new culture in Northern Italy and is distinguished by the Polada culture. Polada settlements were mainly widespread in wetland locations such as around the large lakes and hills along the Alpine margin. The cities of Toppo Daguzzo and La Starza were known as the center of the Proto-Apennine stage of Palma Campania culture spread in southern Italy at this time. During this period, the Gáta–Wieselburg culture spread from present-day eastern Austria, western Hungary, and southwestern Slovakia to northeastern Italy.

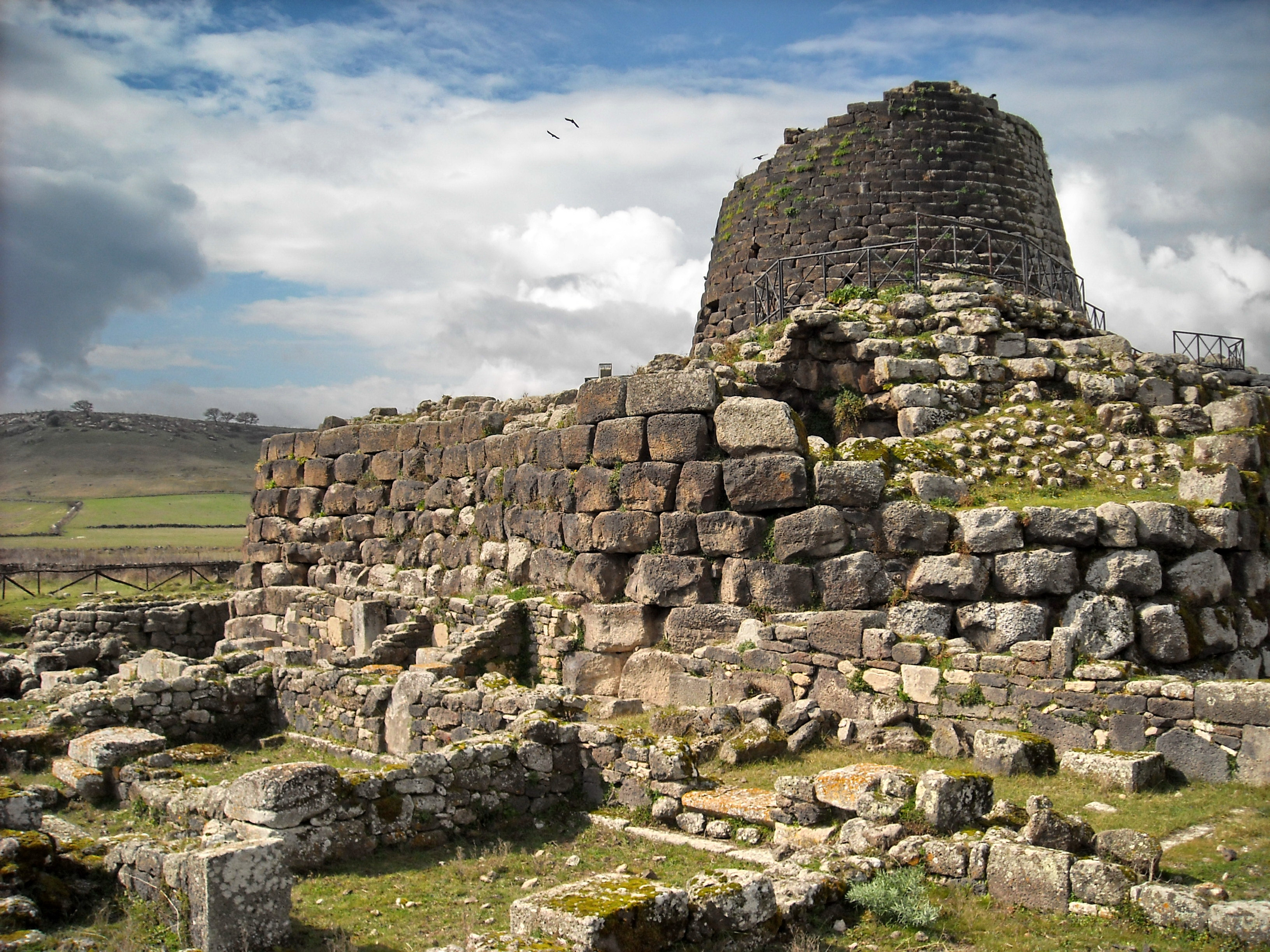
Nuraghe Santu Antine in Torralba, Sardinia, Italy

The Middle Bronze Age, known as the Apennine culture in Central and Southern Italy, was the period when settlements were established both on lowland and upland areas. Hierarchy among the social groups was experienced during this period according to the evidence of the tombs. The two-tier grave found at Toppo Daguzzo is an example of elite groups growth. On the top level, nearly 10 fractured skeletons have been found without any grave objects, while at the lower level eleven burials were found accompanied by different valuable pieces: 6 males with bronze weapons, 4 females with beads and a child. The Middle Bronze Age in Northern Italy was characterised by the Terramare culture.

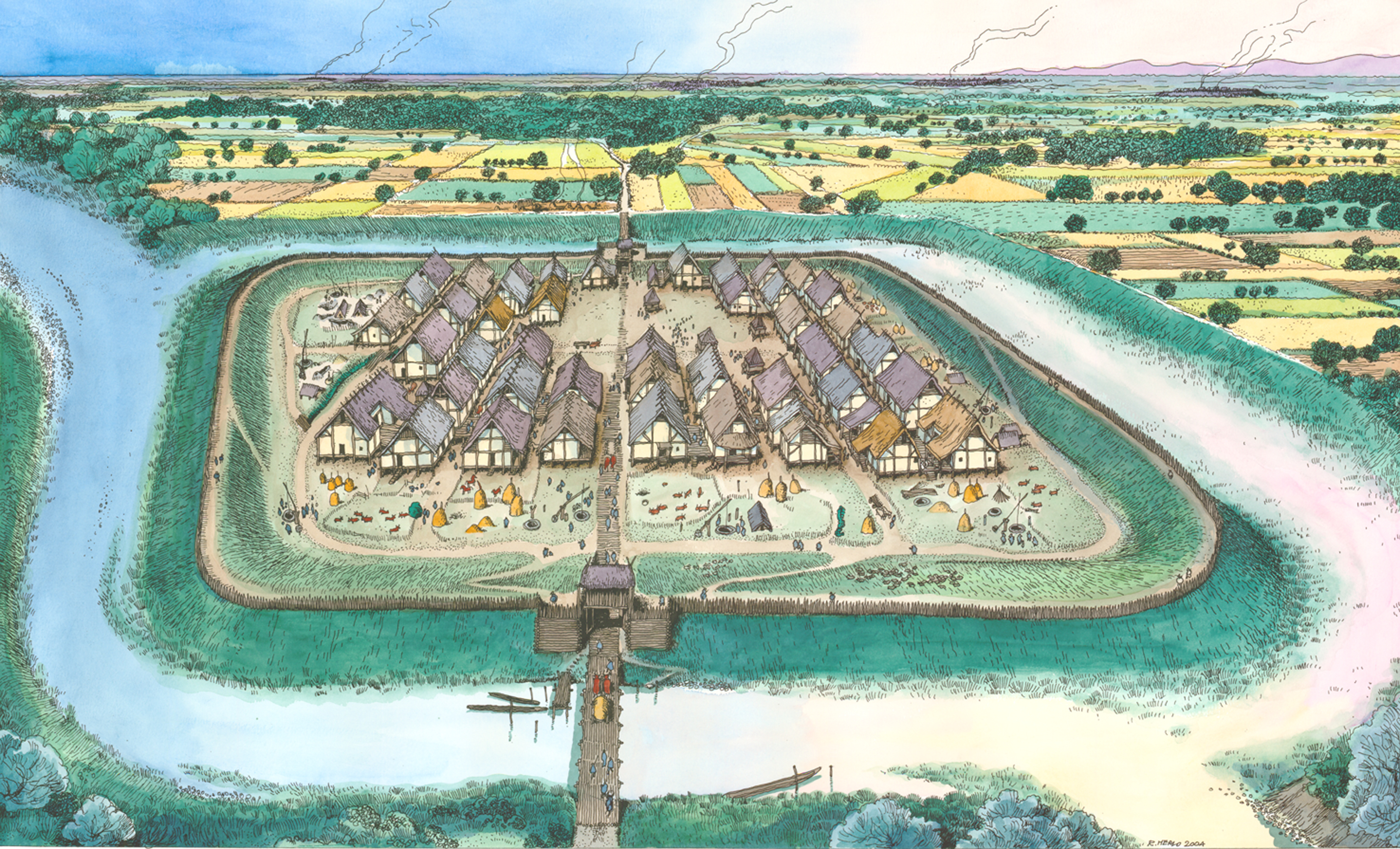
Illustration of a Terramare culture settlement, Italy

The Recent Bronze Age, known as the Sub-Apennine period in Central Italy, is a frame of time when sites relocated to defended locations. At this time settlement hierarchy obviously appeared in cities such as Latium and Tuscany. The Final Bronze Age is the period during which the majority of the Italian peninsula was united in the Proto-Villanovan culture. Pianello di Genga is an exception to the small cemeteries characterized for the Protov-Villanovan culture. More than 500 burials were found in this cemetery which is known for its two centuries of usage by different communities.

During the second millennium BC, the Nuragic civilization flourished in the island of Sardinia. It was a rather homogeneous culture, more than 7000 imposing stone tower-buildings known as Nuraghe were built by this culture all over the island, along with other types of monuments such as the megaron temples, the monumental Giants' graves and the holy well temples. Sanctuaries and larger settlements were also built starting from the late second millennium BC to host these religious structures along with other structures such ritual pools, fountains and tanks, large stone roundhouses with circular benches used for the meeting of the leaders of the chiefdoms and large public areas. Bronze tools and weapons were widespread and their quality increased thanks to the contacts between the Nuragic people and Eastern Mediterranean peoples such as the Cypriots, the lost waxing technique was introduced to create several hundred bronze statuettes and other tools. The Nuragic civilization survived throughout the early Iron Age when the sanctuaries were still in use, stone statues were crafted and some Nuraghi were reused as temples.

The Castellieri culture developed in Istria during the Middle Bronze Age. It lasted for more than a millennium, from the 15th century BC until the Roman conquest in the 3rd century BC. It takes its name from the fortified boroughs (Castellieri, Friulian: cjastelir) that characterised the culture.

The Canegrate culture developed from the mid-Bronze Age (13th century BC) until the Iron Age in the Pianura Padana, in what are now western Lombardy, eastern Piedmont, and Ticino. It takes its name from the township of Canegrate, where, in the 20th century, some fifty tombs with ceramics and metal objects were found. The Canegrate culture migrated from the northwest part of the Alps and descended to Pianura Padana from the Swiss Alps passes and the Ticino.

The Golasecca culture developed starting from the late Bronze Age in the Po plain. It takes its name from Golasecca, a locality next to the Ticino, where in the early 19th century abbot Giovanni Battista Giani excavated its first findings comprising some 50 tombs with ceramics and metal objects. Remains of the Golasecca culture span an area of about 20,000 km^{2} (4,900,000 acres) south to the Alps, between the Po, Sesia, and Serio rivers, dating to the 9th–4th centuries BC.

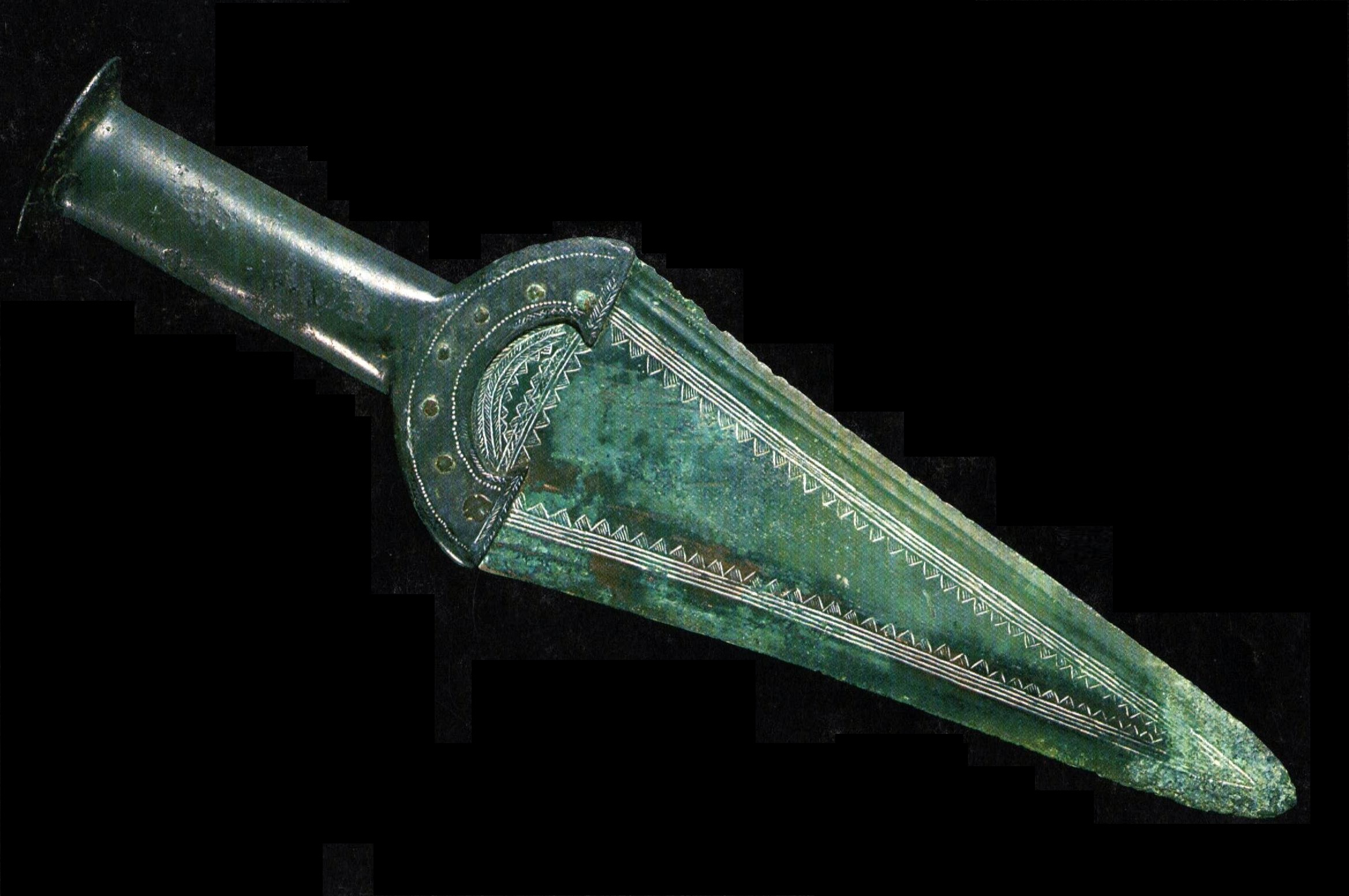
Early Bronze Age dagger, central Italy

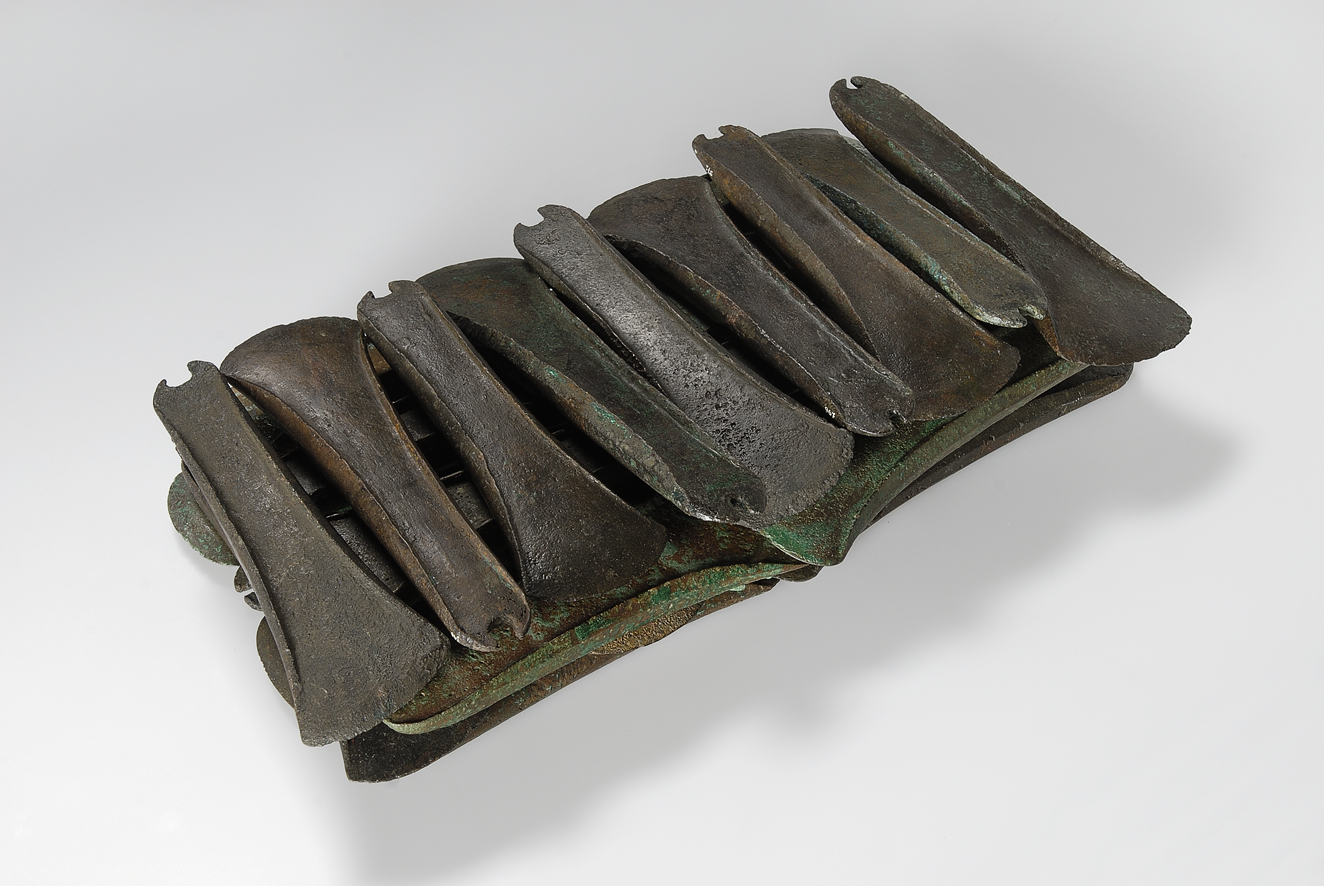
Early Bronze Age axe hoard, c. 2000 BC

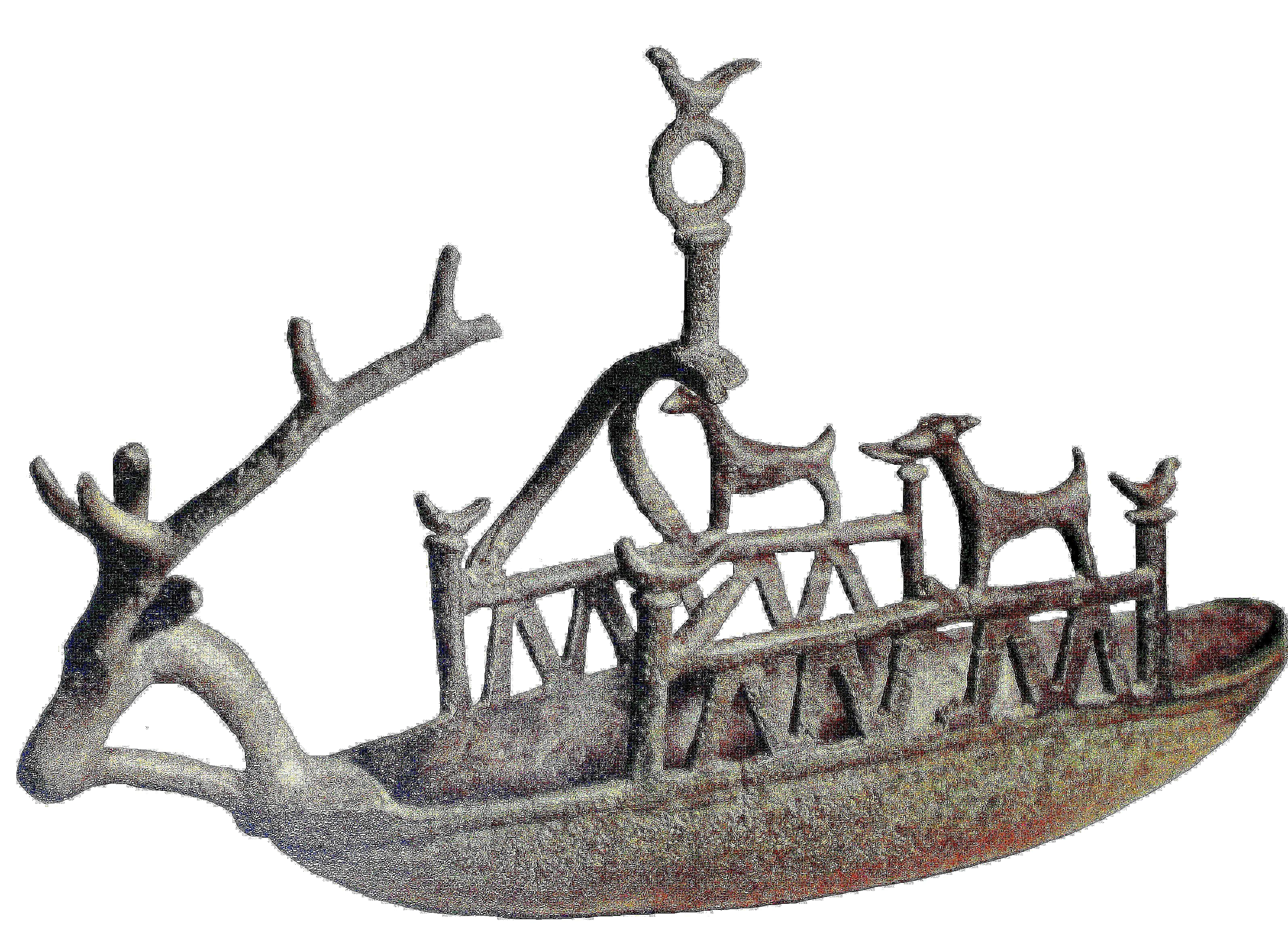
Bronze boat model, Nuragic civilization, Sardinia, c. 1000 BC

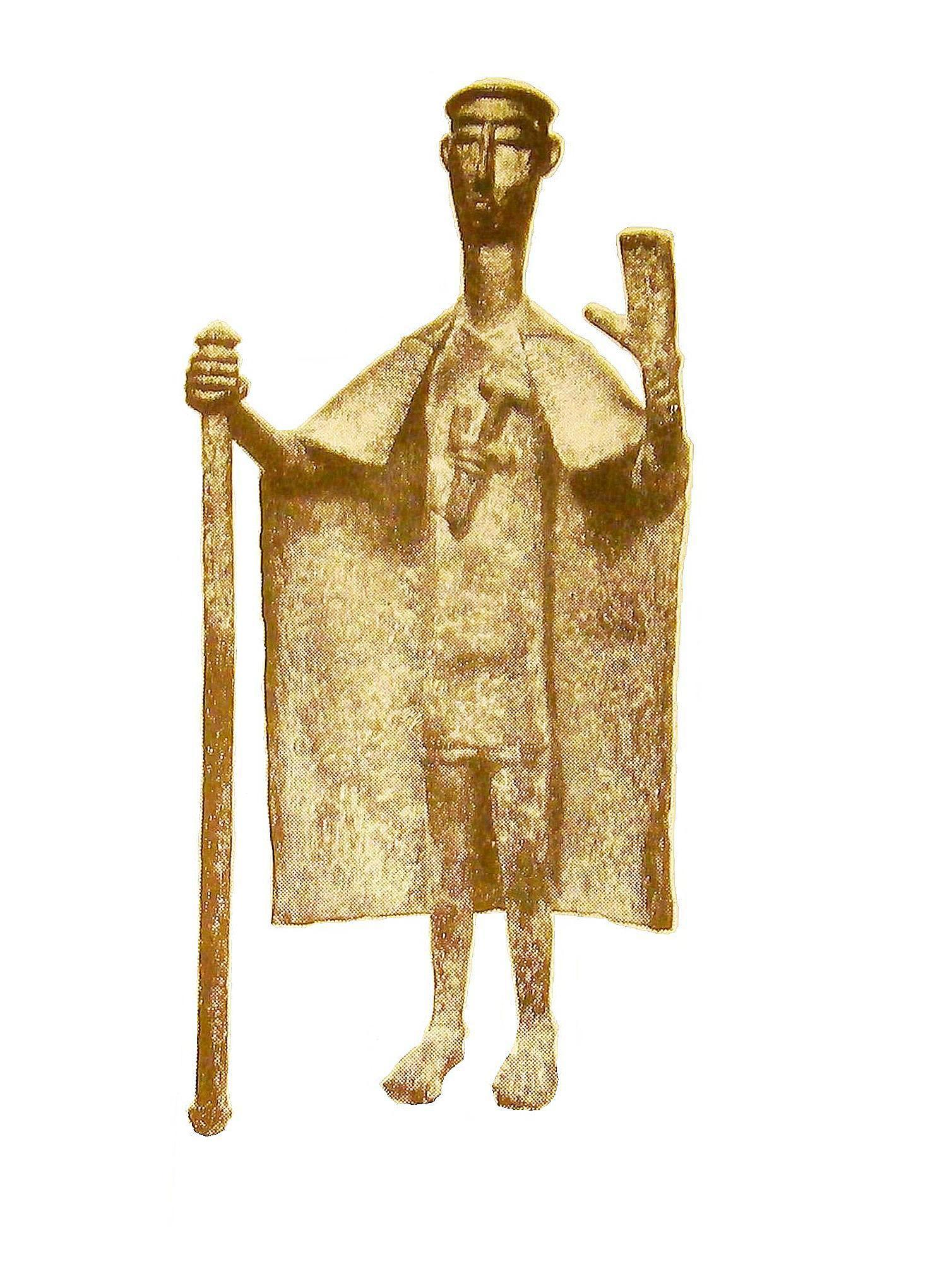
Nuragic Bronze Figurine, Sardinia

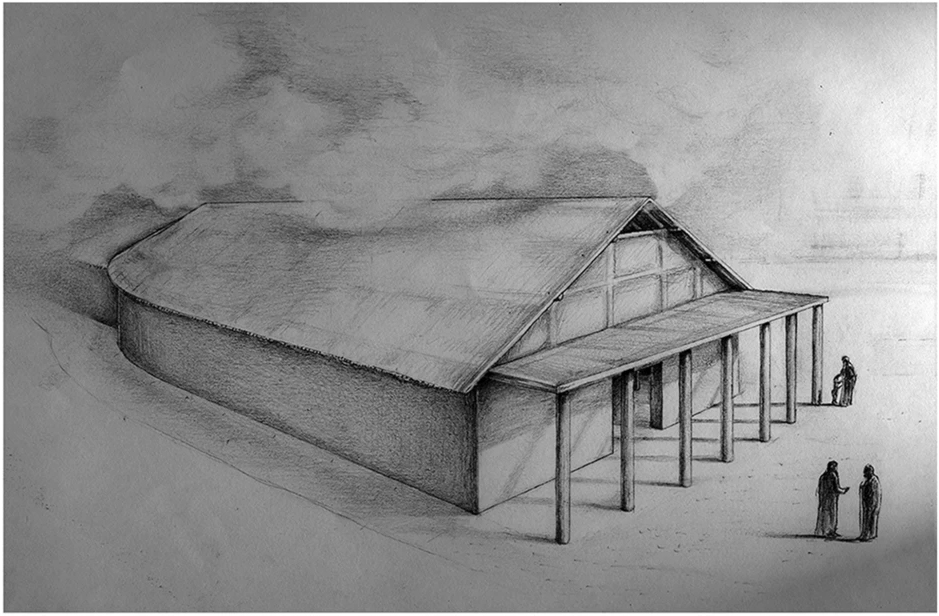
Temple at Roca Vecchia, Proto-Villanovan culture

=== Northern Europe ===
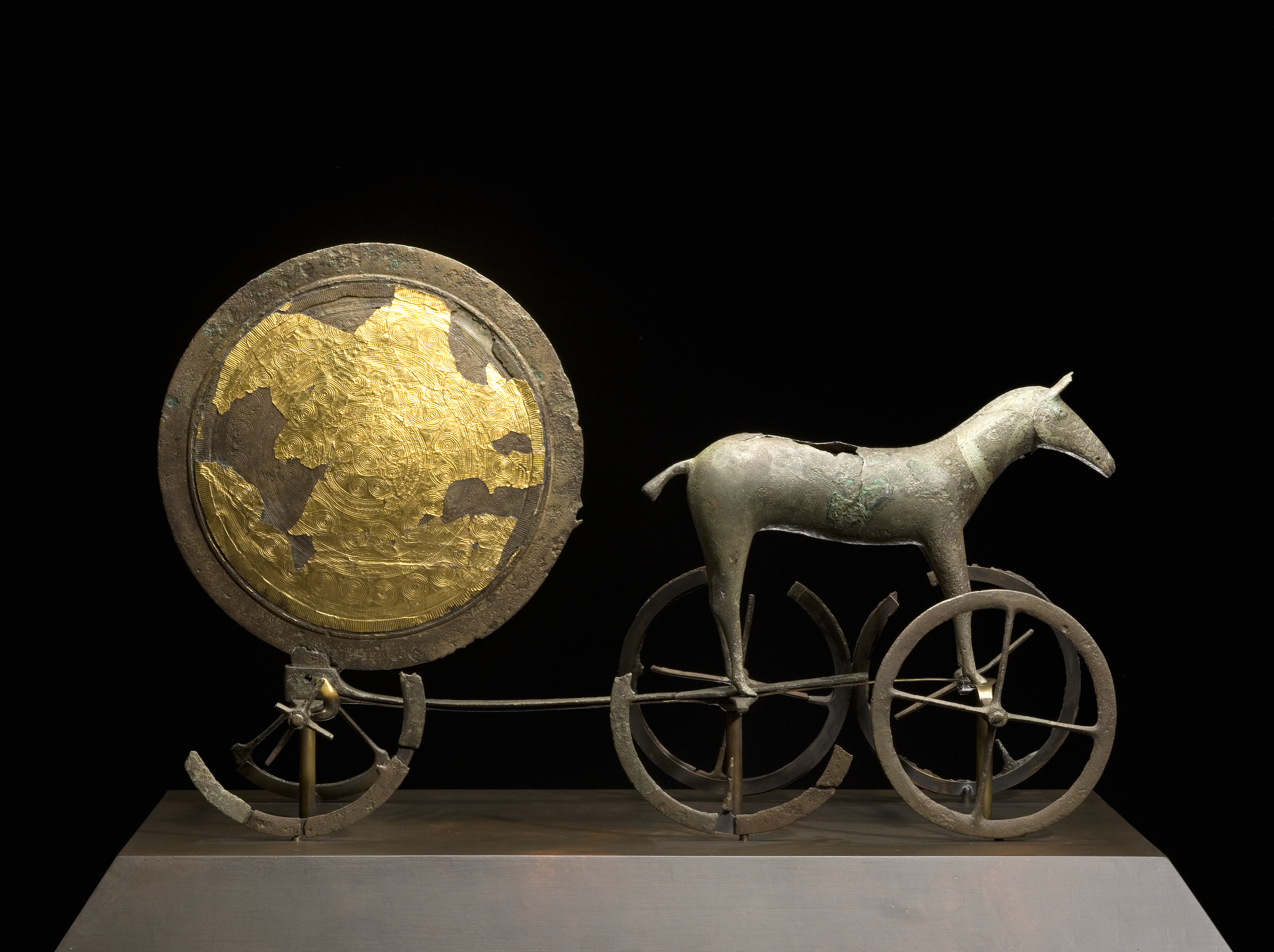
Trundholm sun chariot, Denmark, c. 1500 BC

In northern Germany, Denmark, Sweden and Norway, Bronze Age cultures manufactured many distinctive and artistic artifacts. This includes lur horns, horned ceremonial helmets, sun discs, gold jewelry and some unexplained finds like the bronze "gong" from Balkåkra in Sweden. In 2026, isotopic analysis identified previously undocumented mines in Extremadura, Spain, as the primary metal source for many of these artifacts, confirming the reach of the maritime trade network between the Nordic Bronze Age and the southern Iberian Peninsula. Some linguists believe that an early Indo-European language was introduced to the area probably around 2000 BC, which eventually became Proto-Germanic, the last common ancestor of the Germanic languages. This would fit with the apparently unbroken evolution of the Nordic Bronze Age into the most probably ethnolinguistically Germanic Pre-Roman Iron Age.

The age is divided into the periods I–VI, according to Oscar Montelius. Period Montelius V, already belongs to the Iron Age in other regions.

Bronze Age archaeological cultures in Northern Europe include:

- Bell Beaker culture
- Nordic Bronze Age
- Urnfield culture
- Lusatian culture
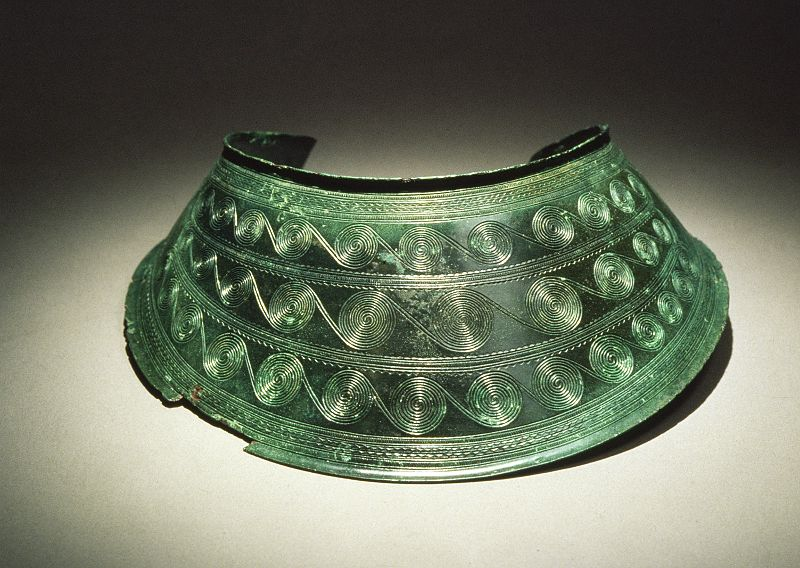
Bronze collar, Nordic Bronze Age, Sweden, c. 1400 BC

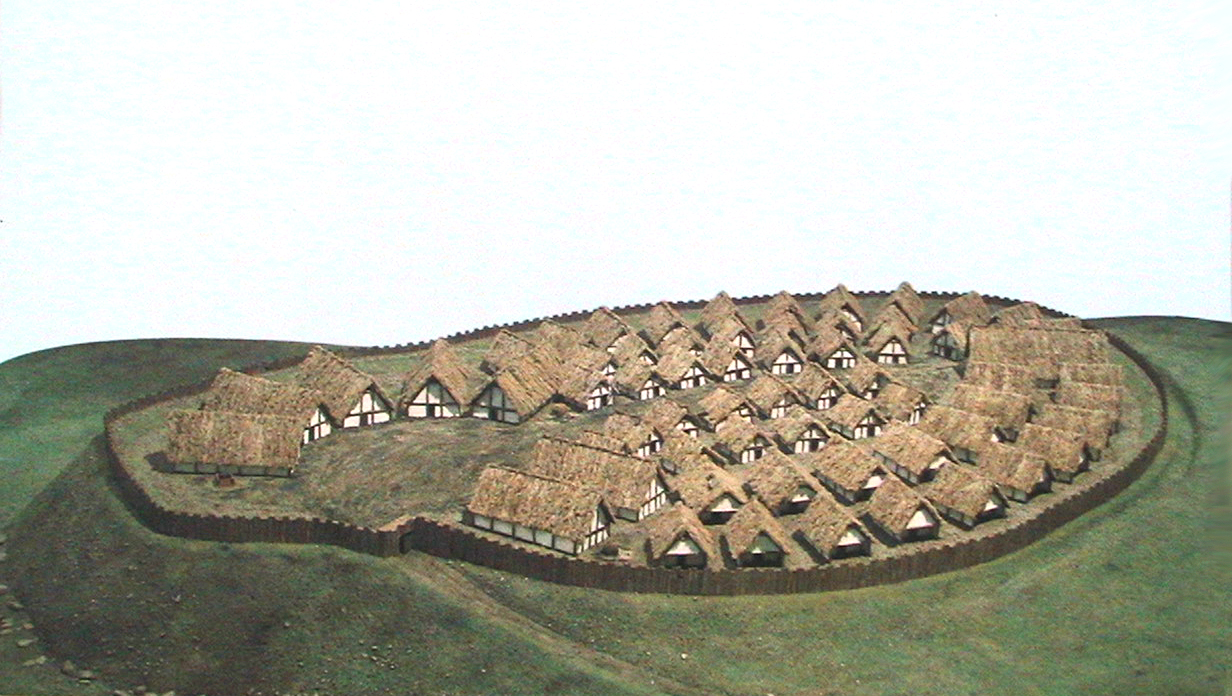
Hünenburg bei Watenstedt, Germany, c. 1000 BC

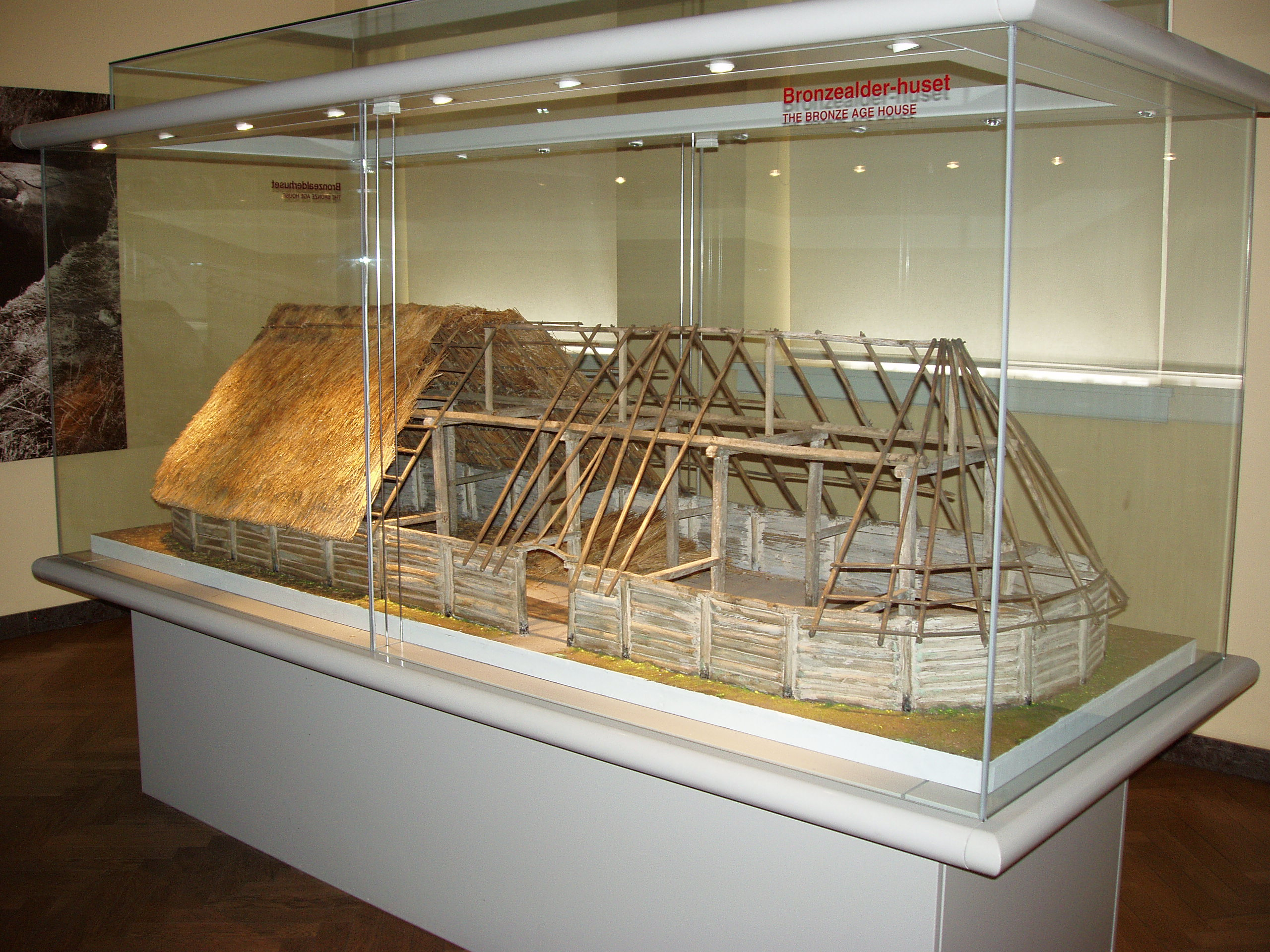
Model of a Bronze Age house, Denmark

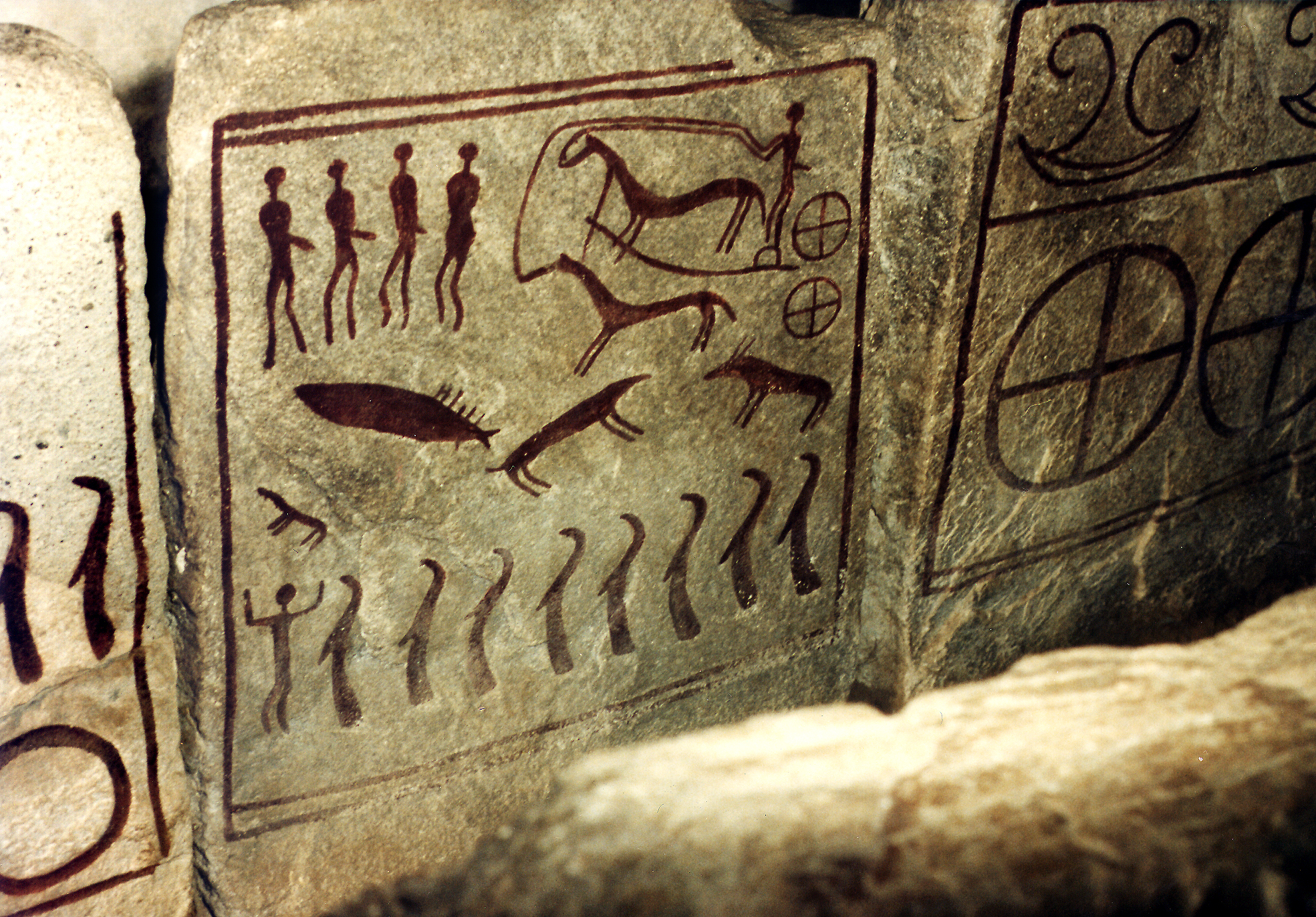
Engraved steles from the Kivik King's Grave, Sweden, c. 1500 BC

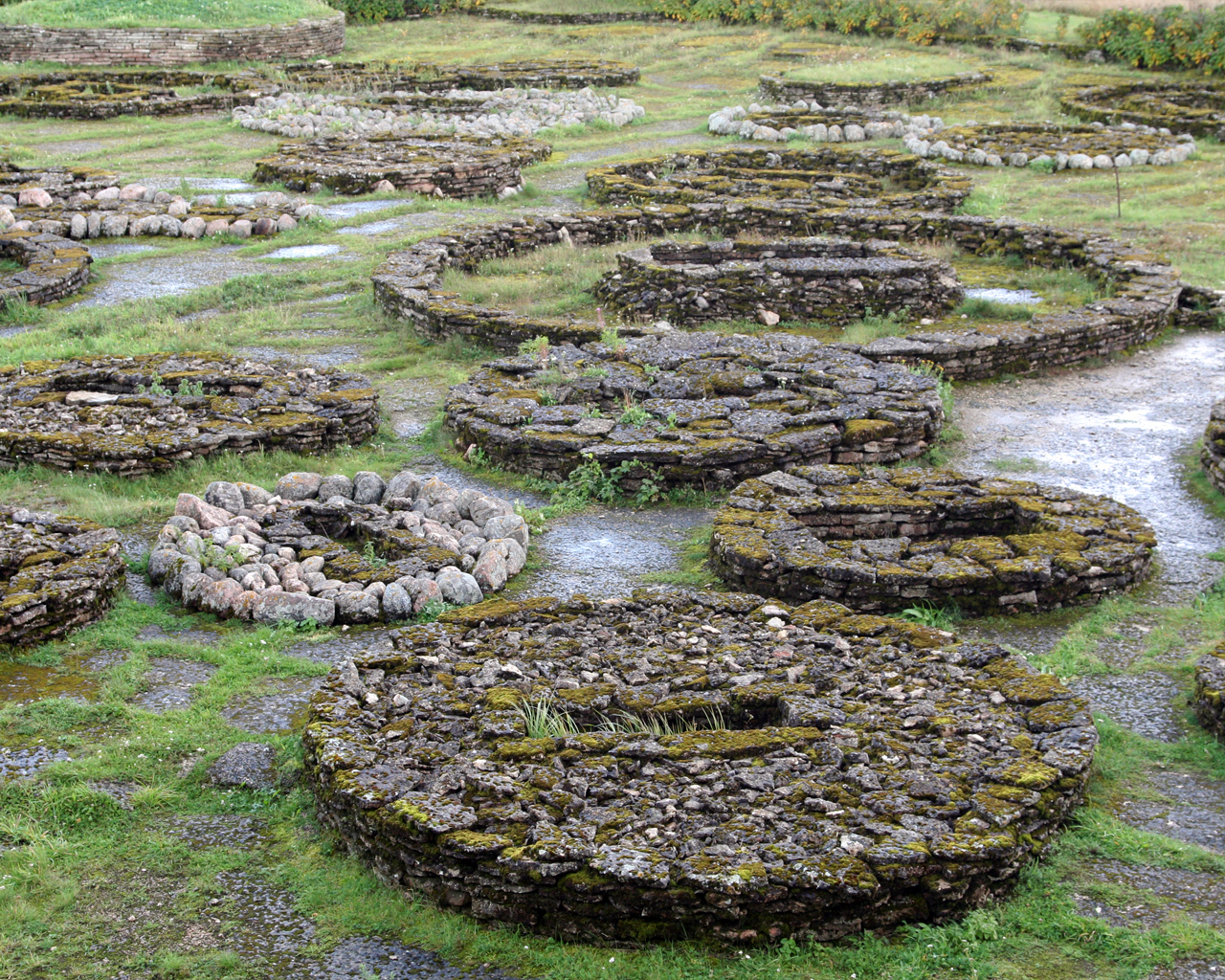
Stone cist graves, Estonia

=== Western Europe ===
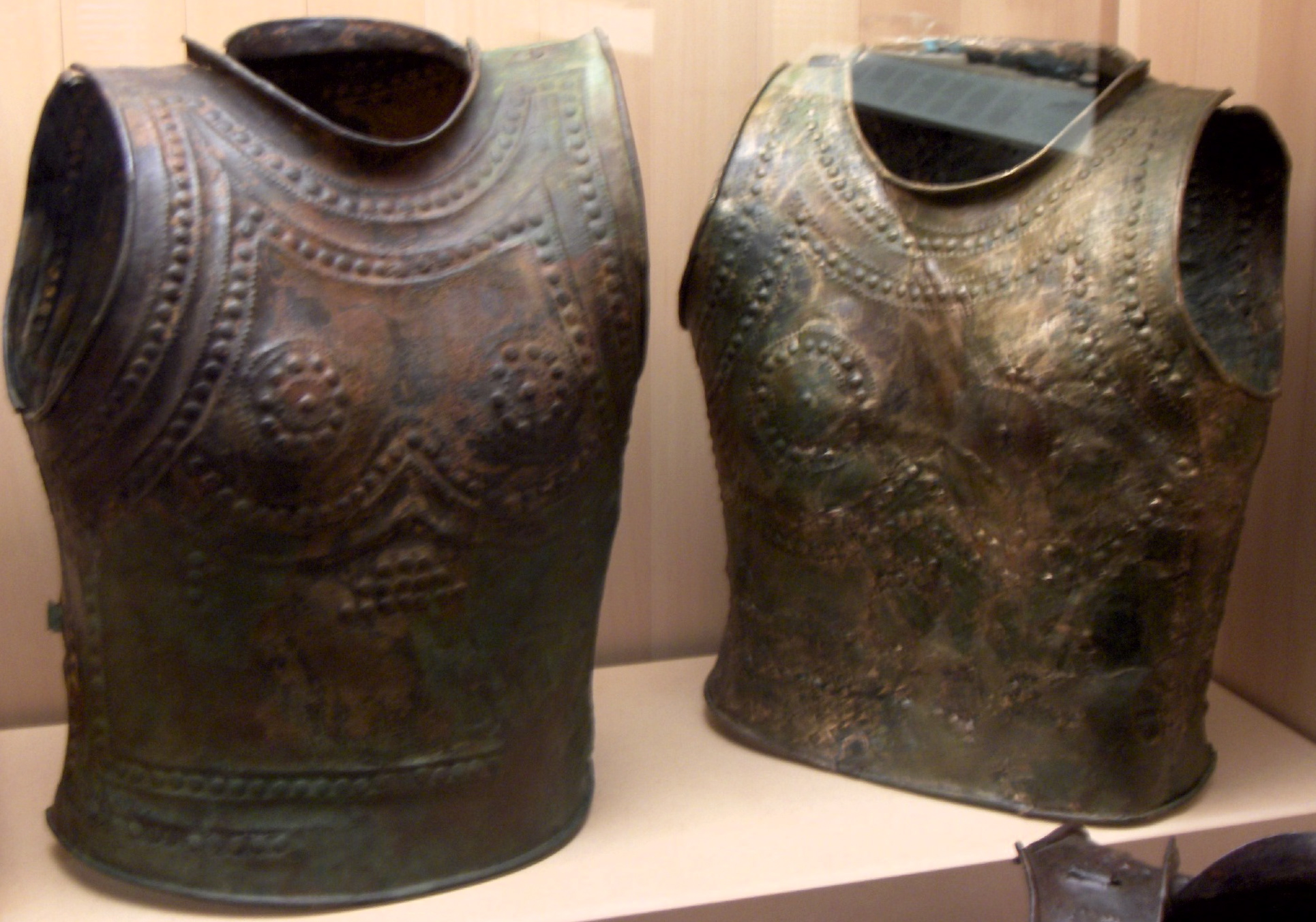
Bronze cuirasses, Urnfield culture, France, 900 BC

The Atlantic Bronze Age is a cultural complex of the Bronze Age period of approximately 1300–700 BC that includes different cultures in Portugal, Andalusia, Galicia, France, Britain, and Ireland and is marked by economic and cultural exchange that led to the high degree of cultural similarity exhibited by coastal communities, including the frequent use of stones as chevaux-de-frise, the establishment of cliff castles, or the domestic architecture sometimes characterized by the round houses. Commercial contacts extended from Sweden and Denmark to the Mediterranean. The period was defined by a number of distinct regional centres of metal production, unified by a regular maritime exchange of some of their products. The major centres were southern England and Ireland, north-western France, and western Iberia.

Bronze Age archaeological cultures in Western Europe include:

- Bell Beaker culture
- Rhône culture
- Armorican Tumulus culture
- Hilversum culture
- Atlantic Bronze Age
- Urnfield culture
- Tumulus culture
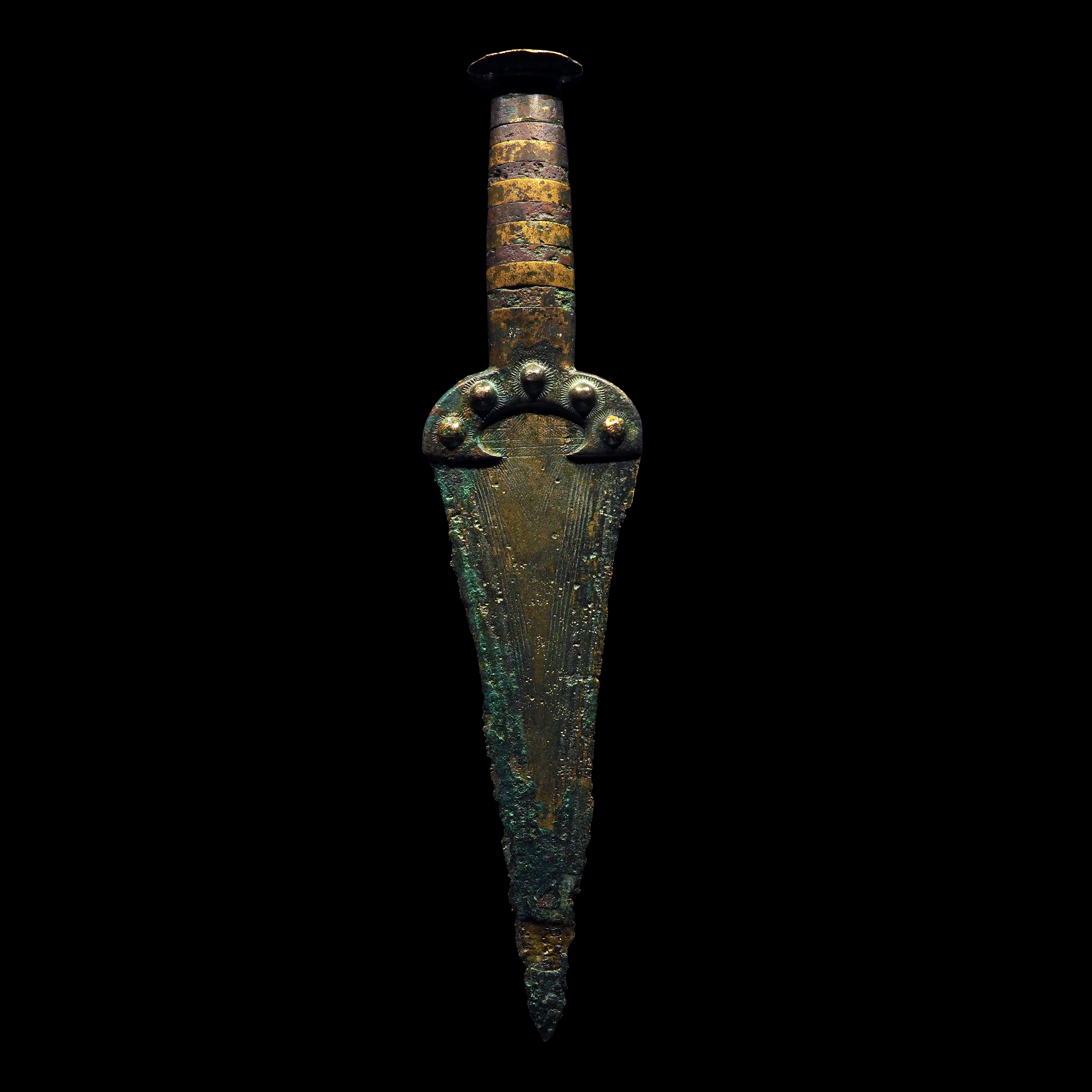
Bronze dagger, Rhône culture, Switzerland, c. 2000 BC

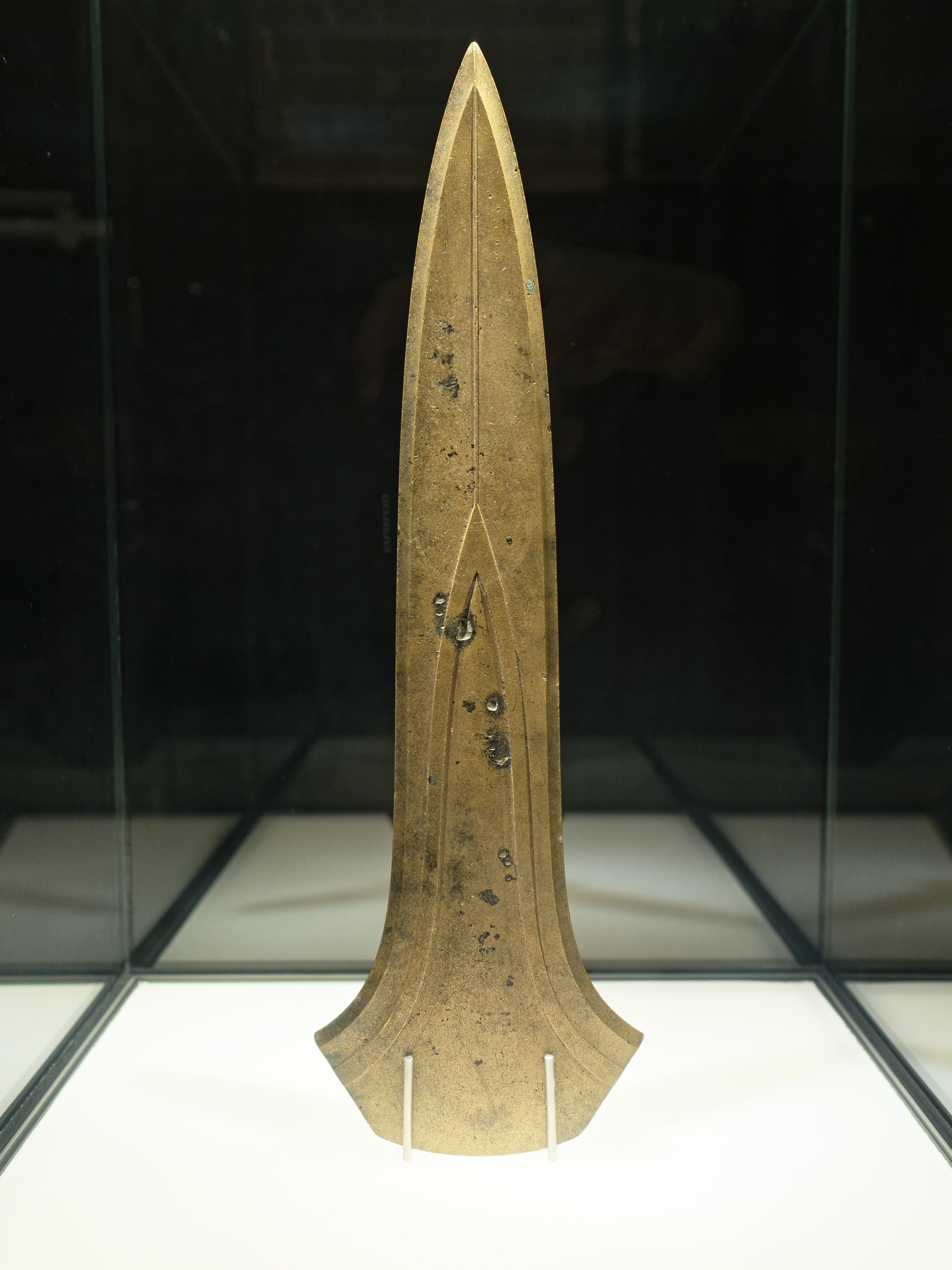
Ceremonial bronze sword, Hilversum culture, Netherlands, c. 1500 BC

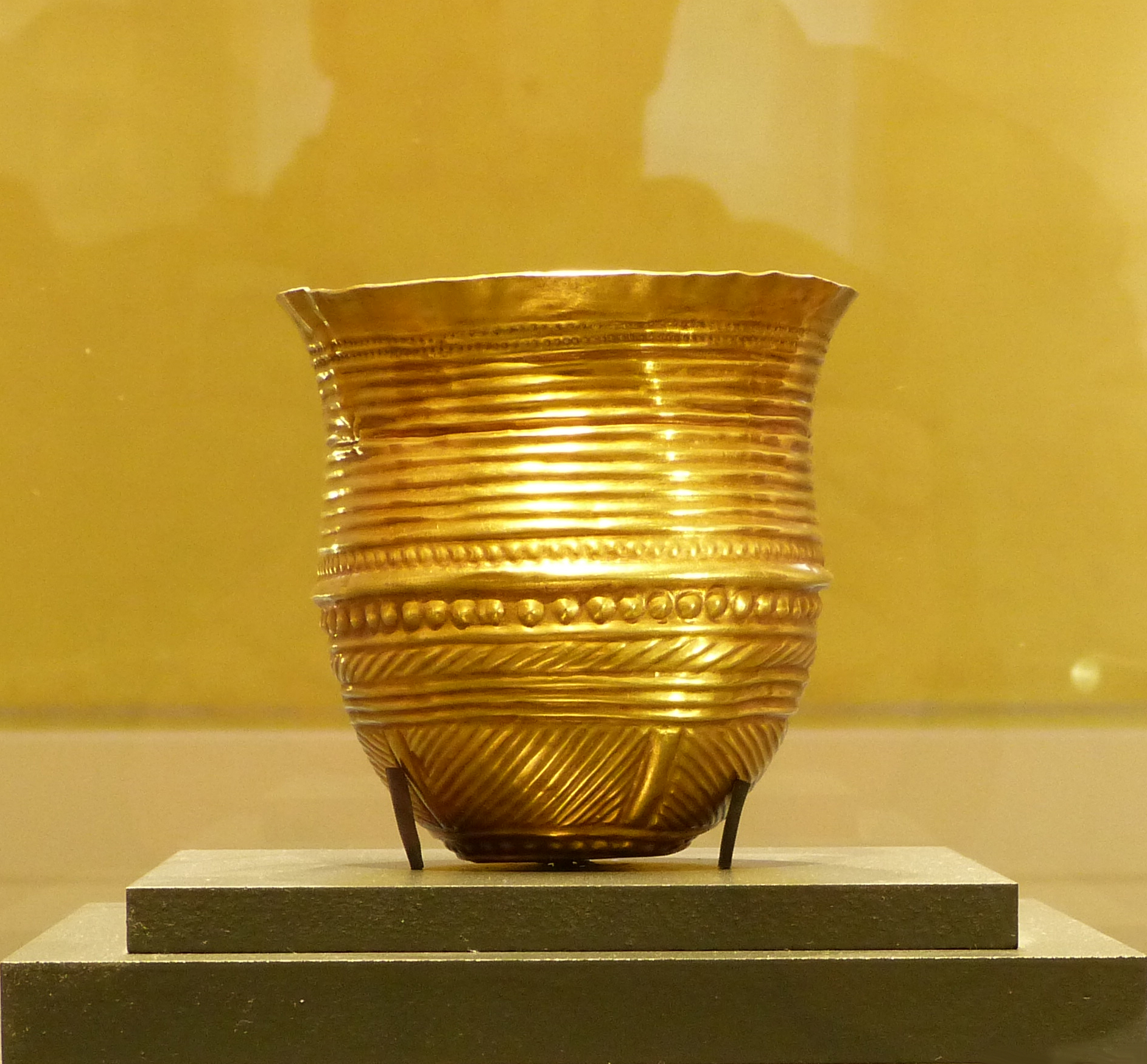
Eschenz gold cup, Tumulus culture, c. 1600 BC

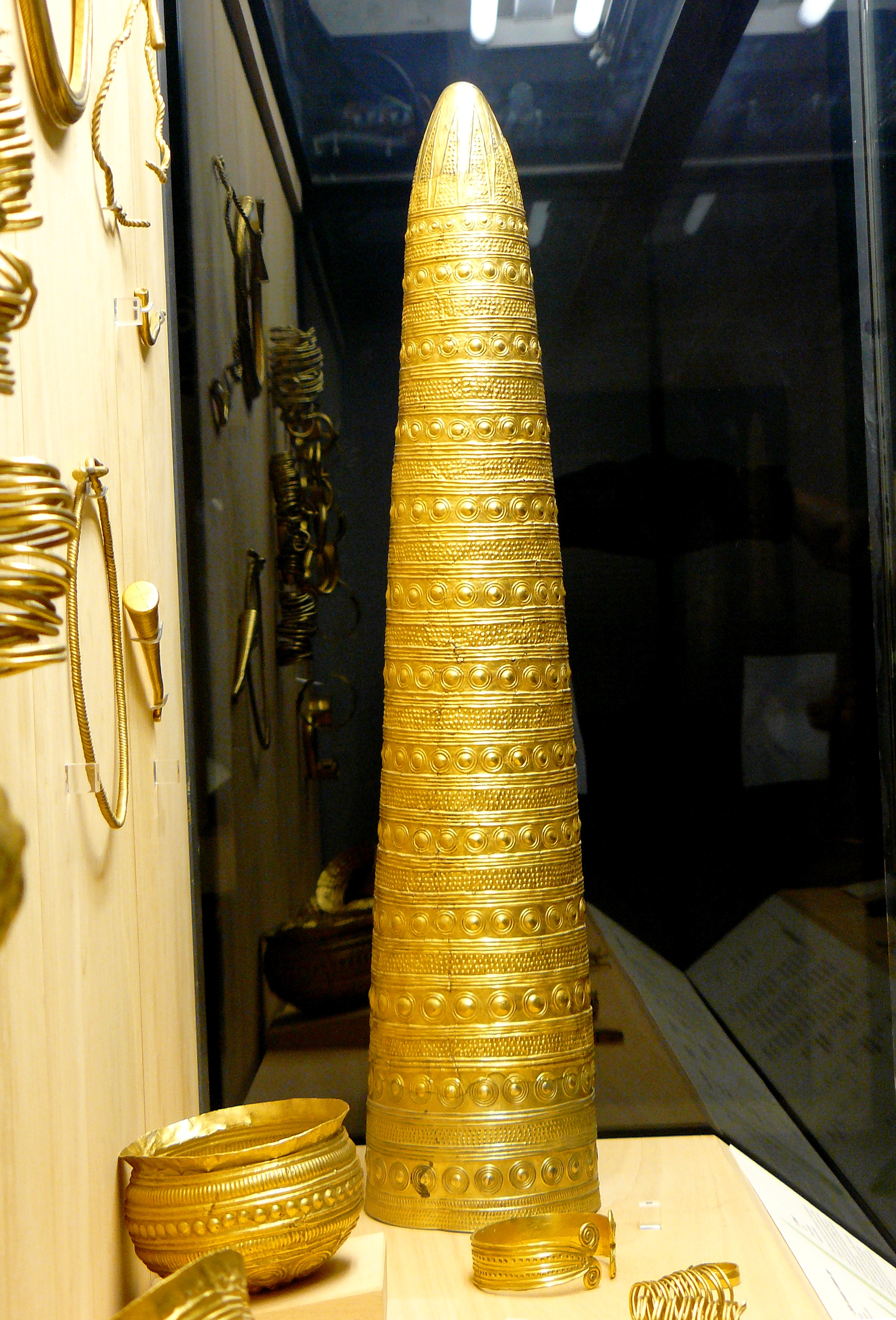
Avanton gold hat, Tumulus culture, France, 1400 BC

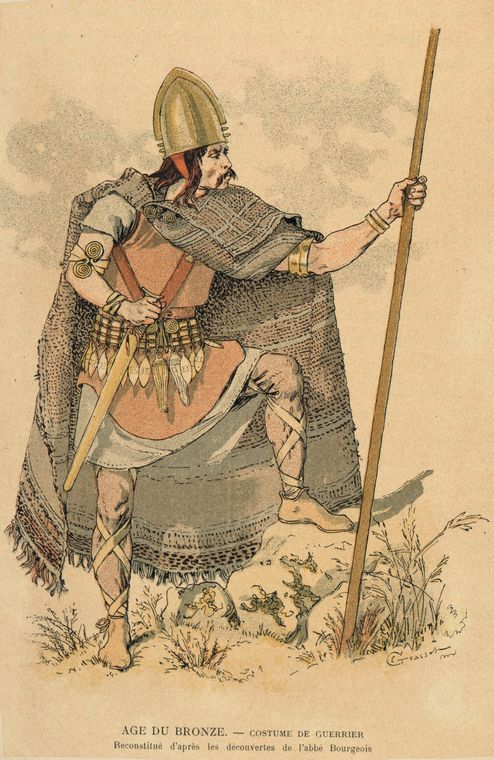
Illustration of an Urnfield culture warrior, France

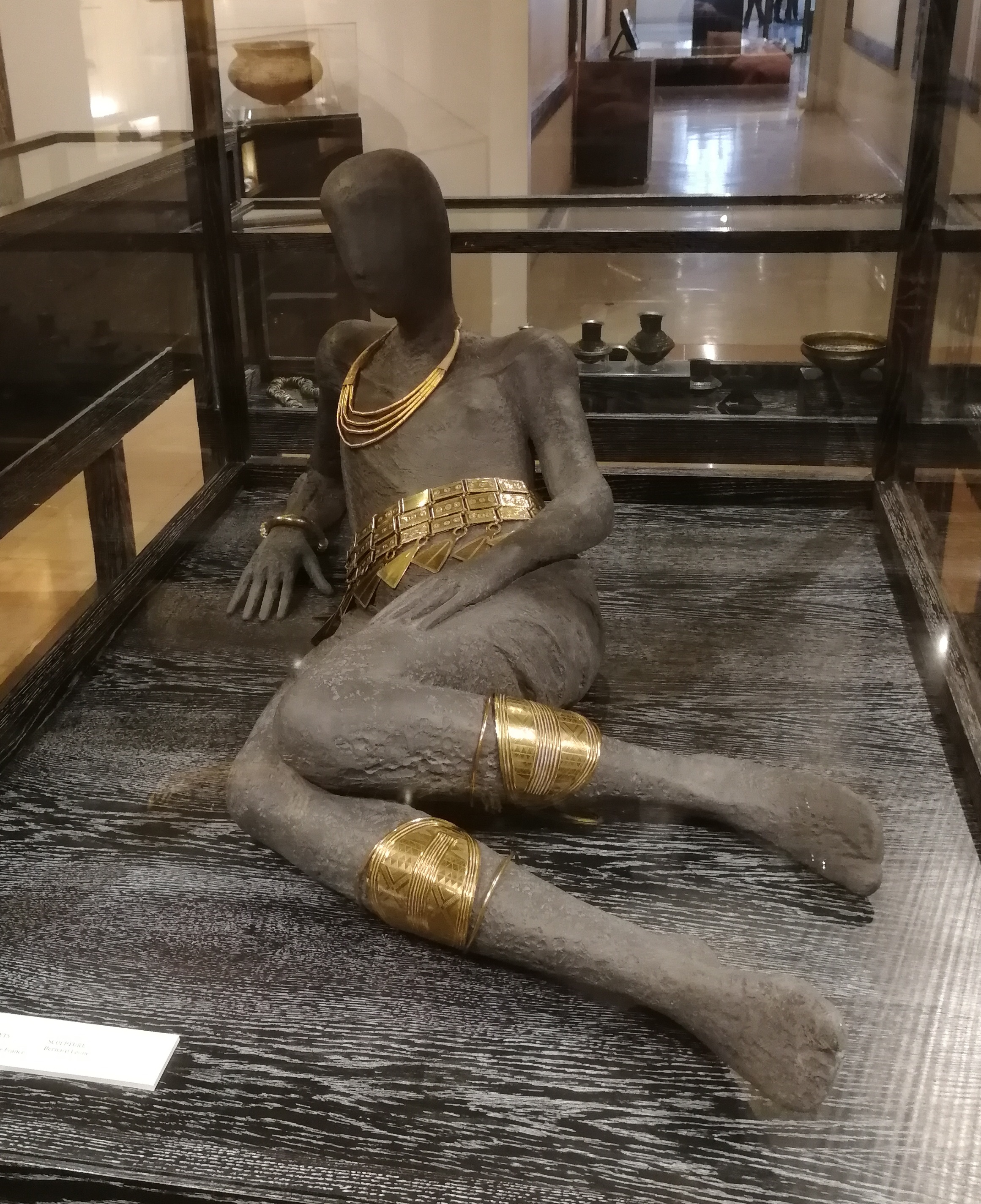
Bronze ornaments Urnfield culture, France, c. 1000 BC

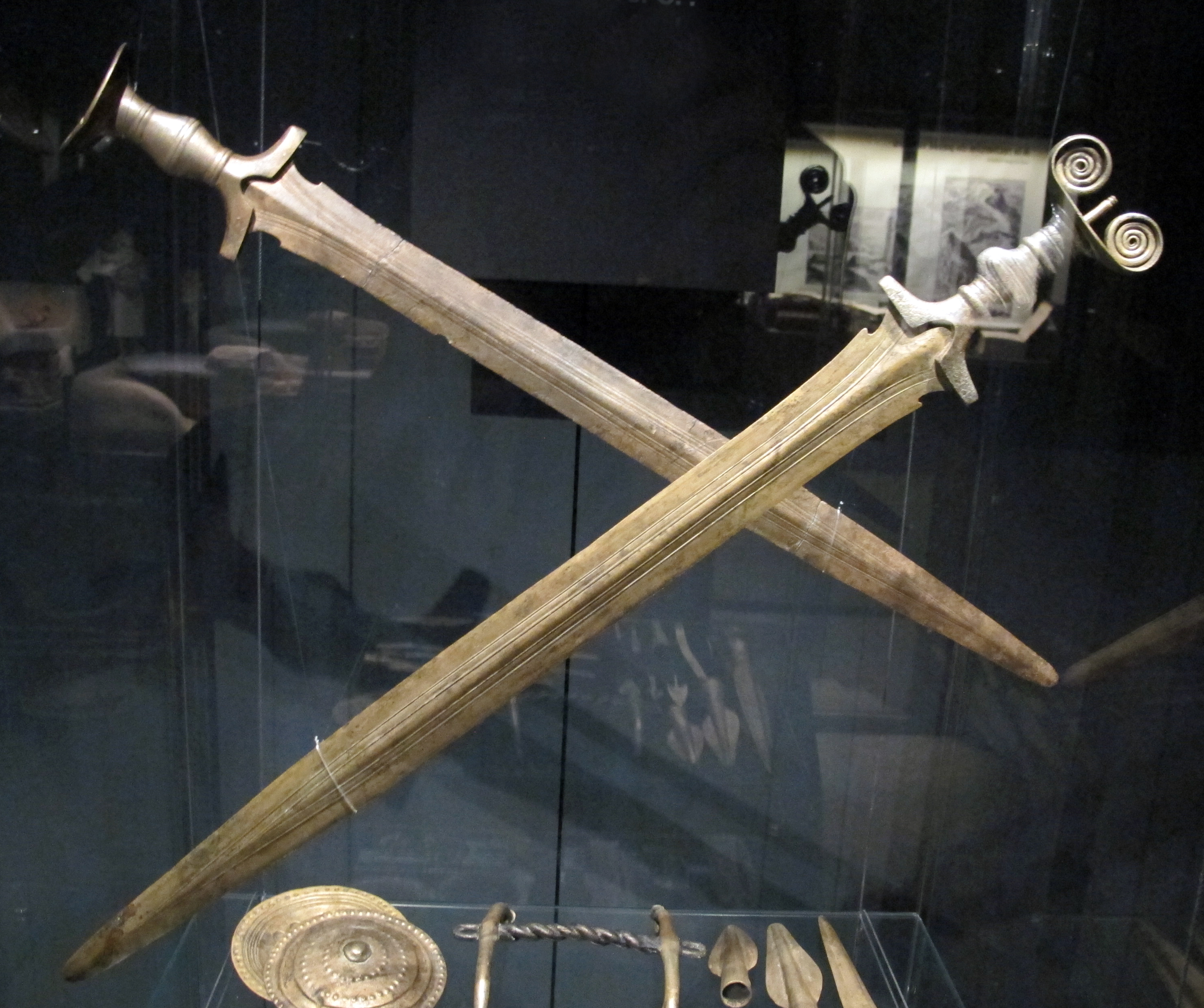
Bronze swords, Urnfield culture, Switzerland, 10th century BC

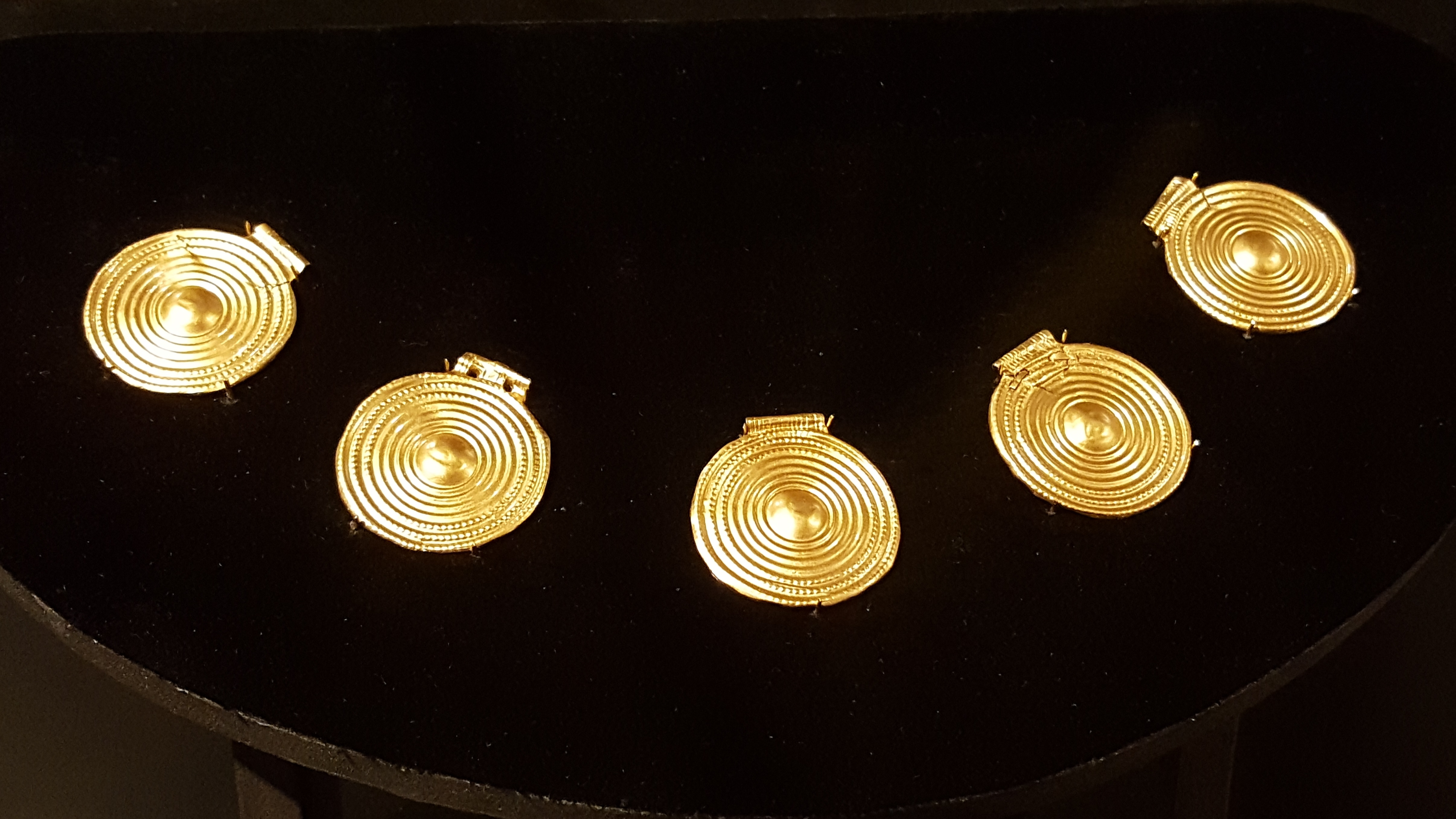
Gold necklace, Urnfield culture, Belgium, c. 1000 BC

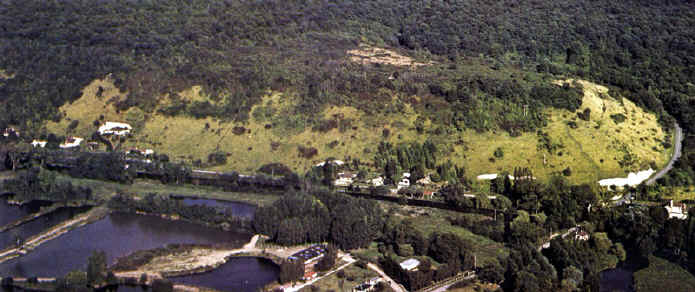
Fort Harrouard hillfort, France, Middle-Late Bronze Age

=== Britain and Ireland ===
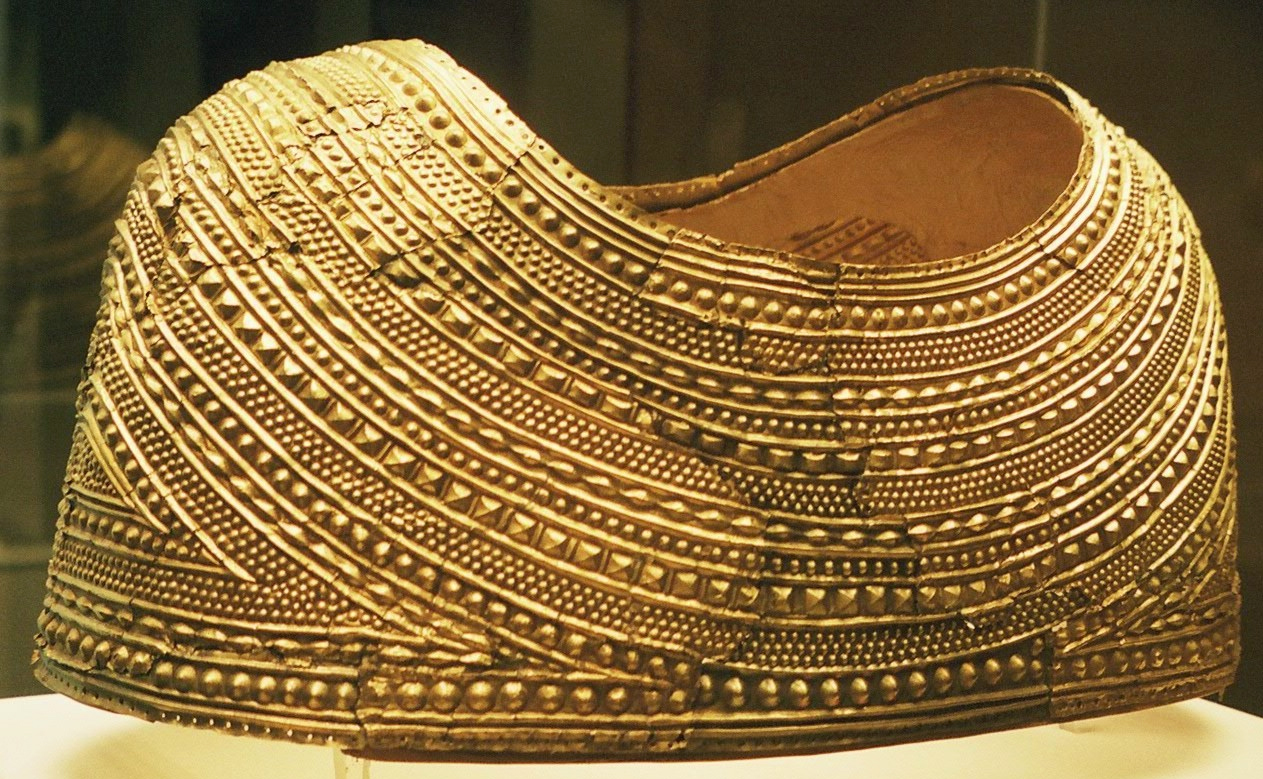
Mold cape, Britain, c. 1900–1700 BC

In Great Britain, the Bronze Age is considered to have been the period from around 2200 to 700 BC. Migration brought new people to the islands from the continent. Recent tooth enamel isotope research on bodies found in early Bronze Age graves around Stonehenge indicate that at least some of the immigrants came from the area of modern Switzerland. The Beaker people displayed different behaviors from the earlier Neolithic people and cultural change was significant, including the introduction of metalworking (copper and gold) from 2500 BC. By 2200 BC the Beaker people had started to produce tin-bronze. Cornwall and Devon in southwest England have the earliest evidence for tin ore exploitation in Europe. Britain was also the first region in Europe to fully adopt tin-bronze technology and switch all metalwork from copper and arsenical bronze to full tin-bronze. This full adoption subsequently occurred across Scandinavia and Central Europe by around 1800 BC and later in southern Iberia, the Aegean (Greece) and Egypt by around 1500/1300 BC.

An analysis of Bronze Age–Early Iron Age tin ingots recovered from four Mediterranean shipwrecks off the coasts of Israel and southern France found that they originated from tin ores in south-west Britain. According to Williams et al. (2025), "the ‘bronzization’ of the East Mediterranean, occurring 1500–1300 BC, was primarily driven by European tin sources, particularly from south-west Britain, rather than Central Asian sources." This situation is reflected in later writings by the Greek historian Herodotus (c. 450 BC), who referred to the Cassiterides or 'tin islands' in the distant northwest as the source for Mediterranean tin. The importance of Britain as a source of tin is also reflected in evidence for connections between elites of the Wessex culture and elites in Mycenaean Greece, notably evidenced in the rich Bush Barrow burial next to Stonehenge. Copper was also extracted and exported to the continent from sites such as the Great Orme mine in northern Wales, as was gold from Cornwall (notably used to make the Nebra Sky Disc associated with the Únětice culture in central Europe).

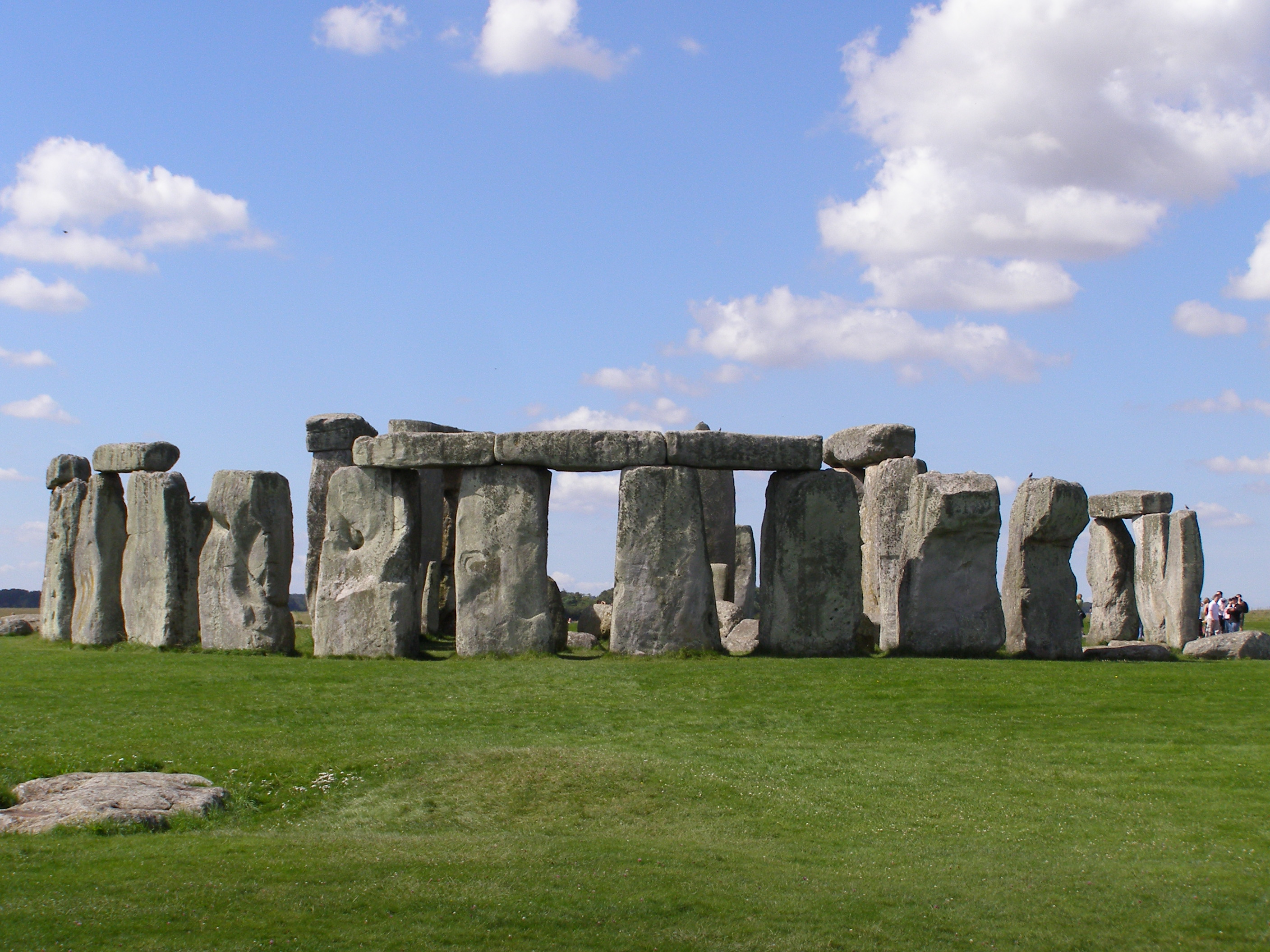
Stonehenge, England

During the Bronze Age the climate deteriorated; where once the weather was warm and dry it became much wetter as the Bronze Age continued, forcing the population away from easily defended sites in the hills and into the fertile valleys. Large livestock ranches developed in the lowlands which appear to have contributed to economic growth and inspired increasing forest clearances. The Deverel–Rimbury culture began to emerge in the second half of the 'Middle Bronze Age' (c. 1400–1100 BC) to exploit these conditions. Social groups appear to have been tribal but with growing complexity and hierarchies becoming apparent.

Also, the burial of dead (which until this period had usually been communal) became more individual. For example, whereas in the Neolithic a large chambered cairn or long barrow was used to house the dead, the 'Early Bronze Age' saw people buried in individual barrows (also commonly known and marked on modern British Ordnance Survey maps as Tumuli), or sometimes in cists covered with cairns.

The greatest quantities of bronze objects found in England were discovered in East Cambridgeshire, where the most important finds were from Isleham (more than 6500 pieces).

The Bronze Age in Ireland commenced in the centuries around 2000 BC when copper was alloyed with tin and used to manufacture Ballybeg type flat axes and associated metalwork. The preceding period is known as the Copper Age and is characterised by the production of flat axes, daggers, halberds and awls in copper. The rich copper ores of Tipperary, Kerry and west Cork provided the needed raw material. The period is divided into three phases: Early Bronze Age 2000–1500 BC; Middle Bronze Age 1500–1200 BC and Late Bronze Age 1200–c. 500 BC. Ireland is also known for a relatively large number of Early Bronze Age burials.

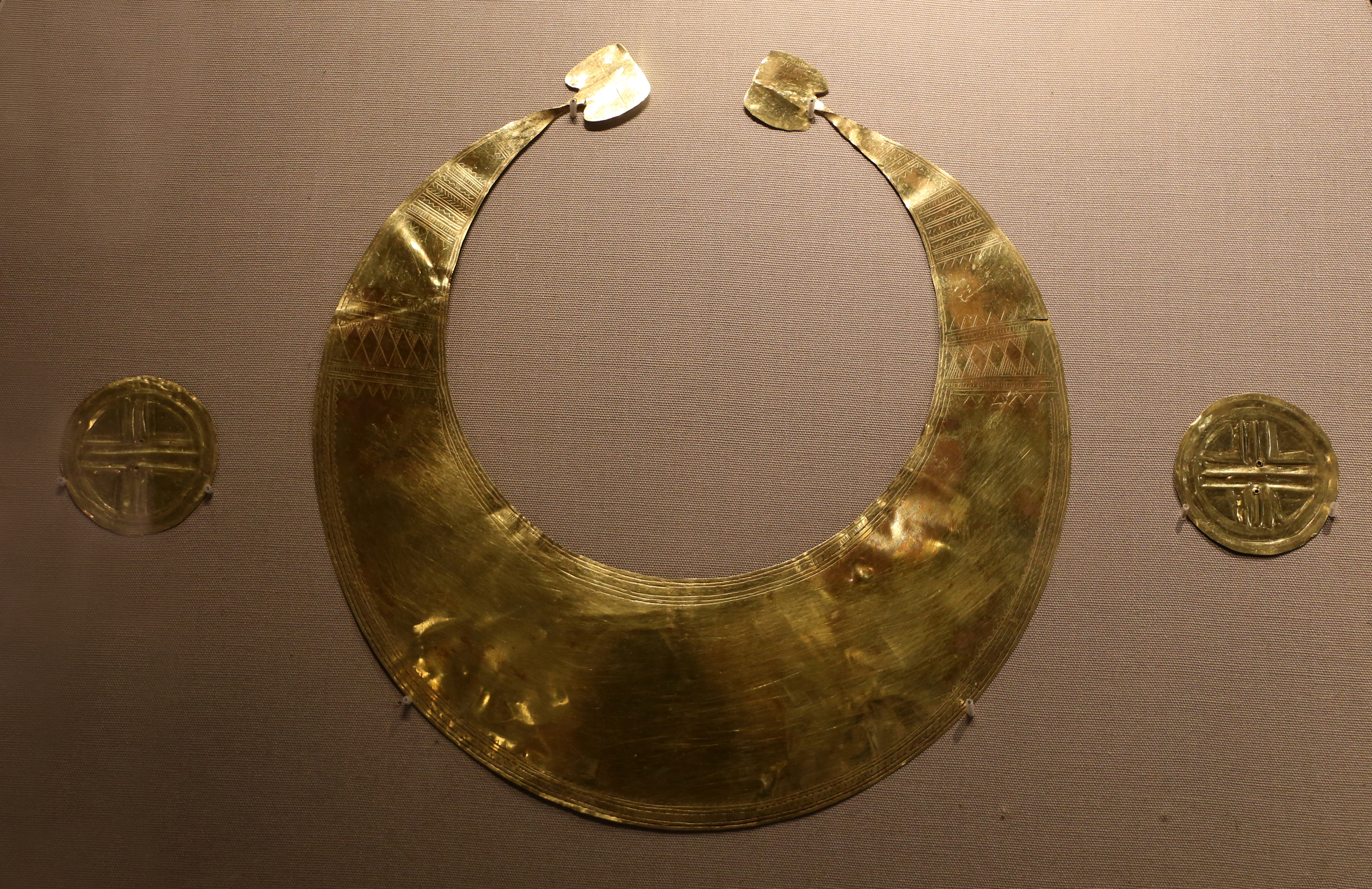
Gold lunula and discs, Bell Beaker culture, Ireland, c. 2200 BC

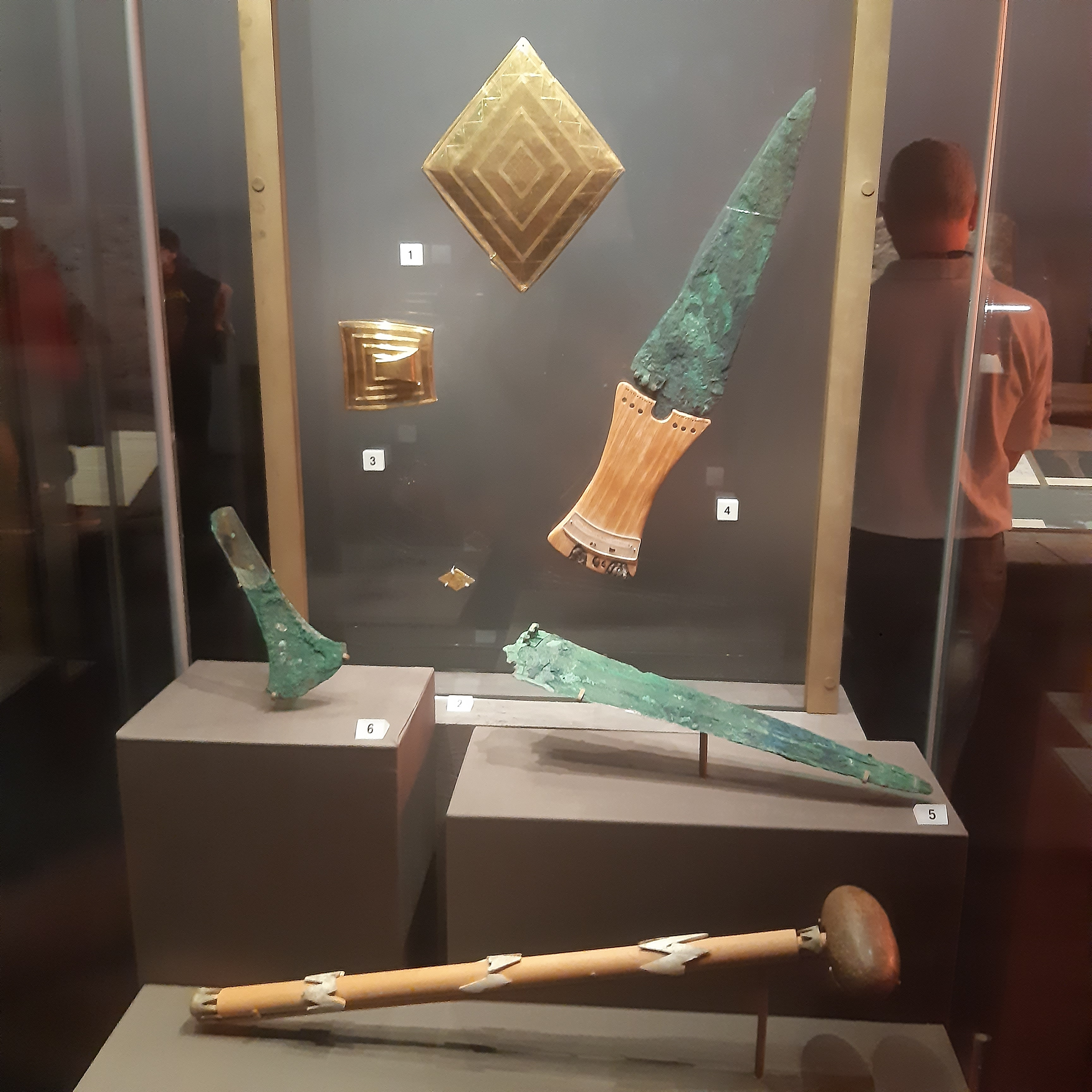
Artefacts from Bush Barrow, c. 1900 BC

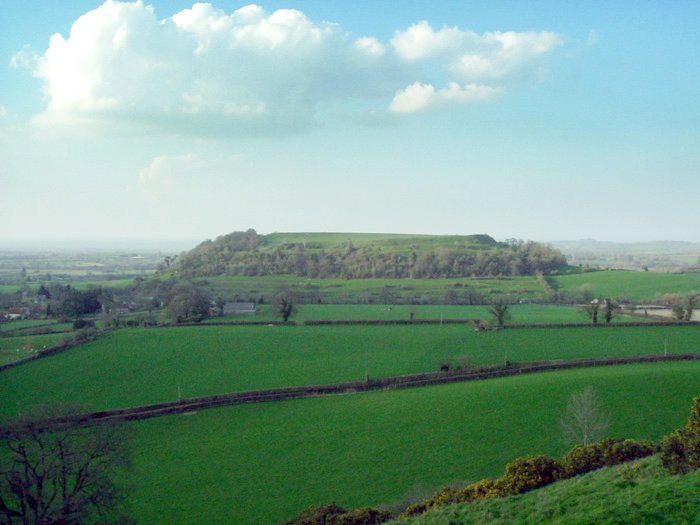
Cadbury Castle in Somerset, a Late Bronze Age hillfort

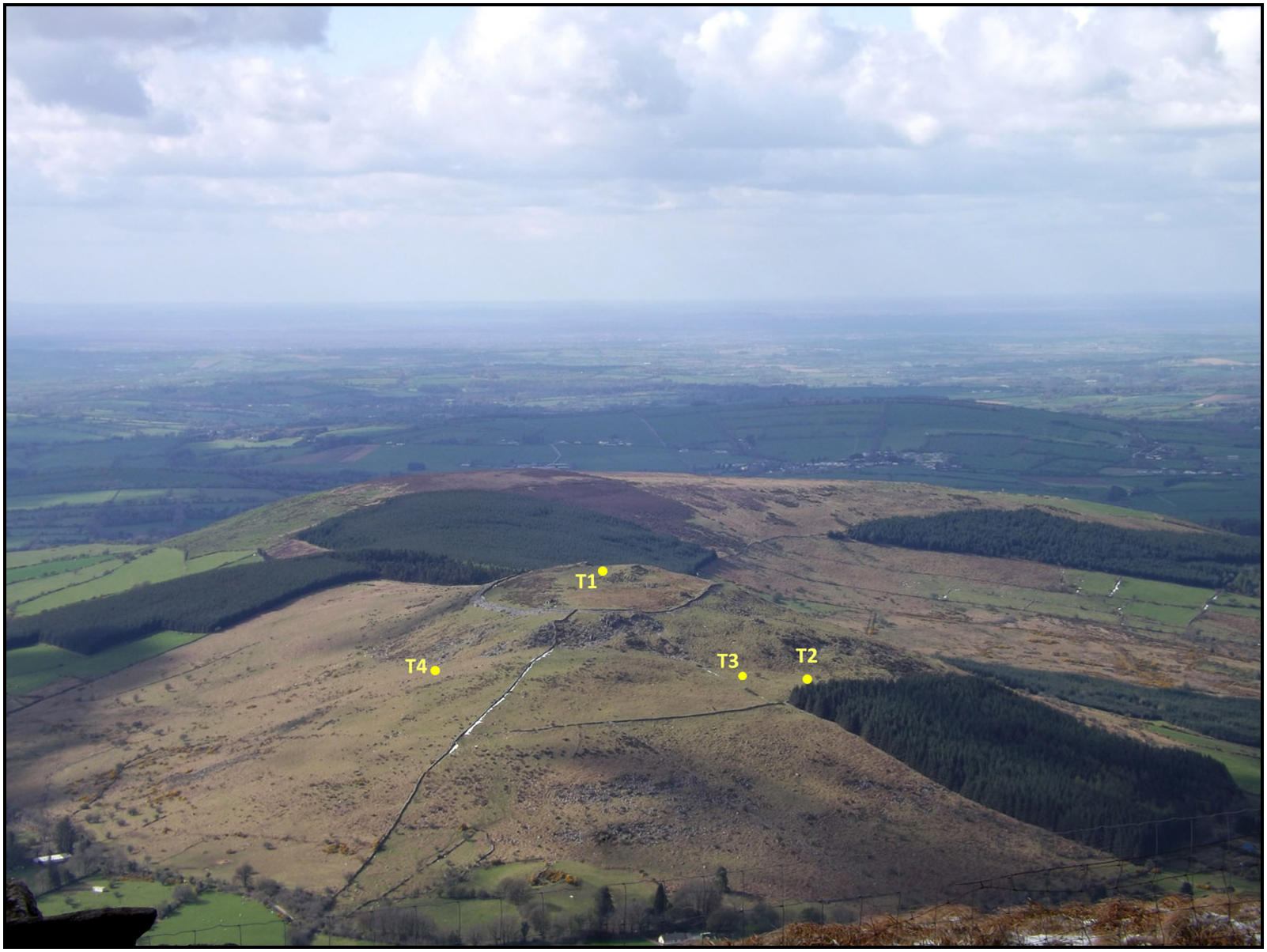
Brusselstown Ring hillfort, Ireland

=== Iberia ===
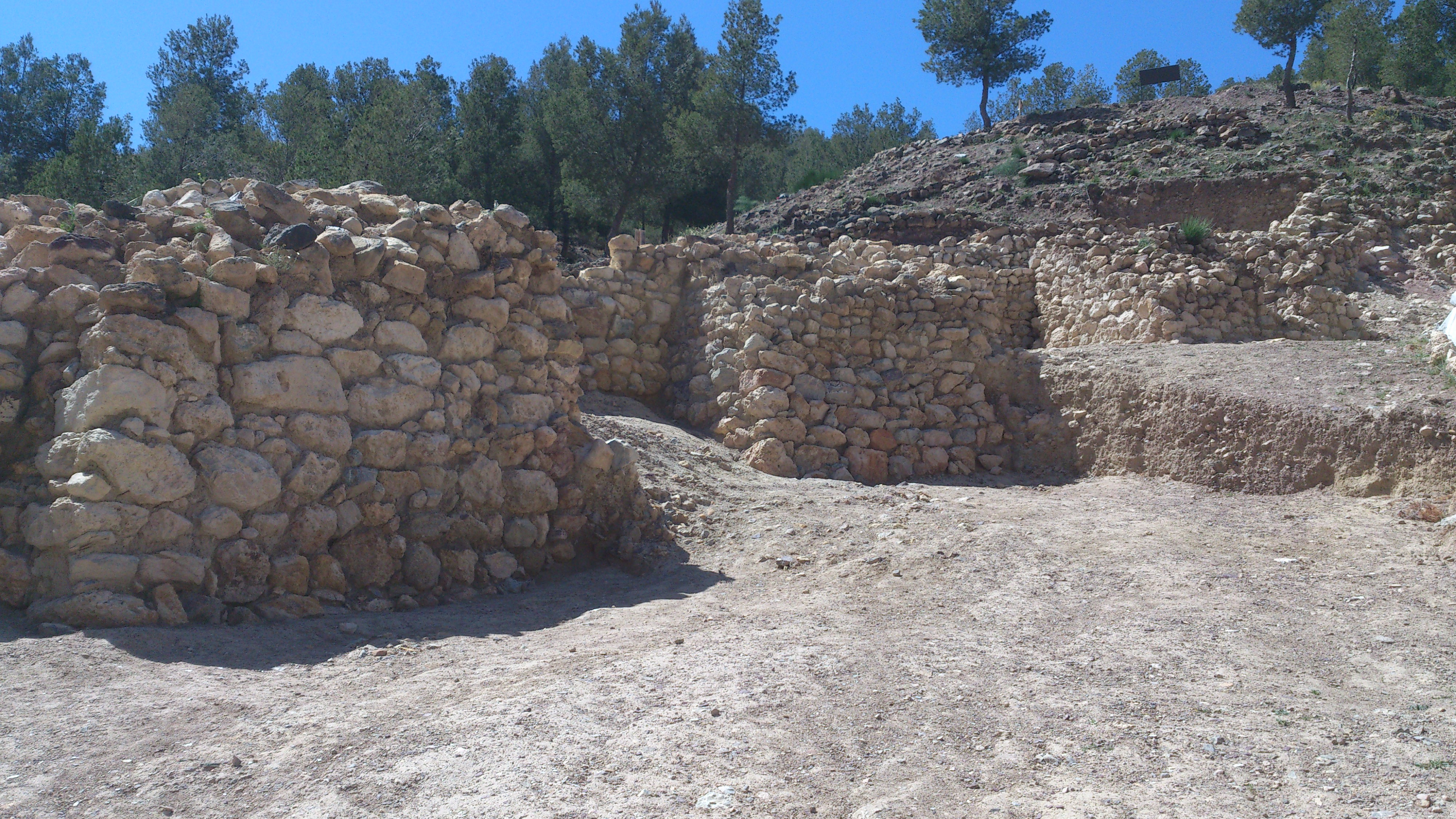
Remains of La Bastida de Totana fortified town in Spain

Preceded by the Chalcolithic sites of Los Millares, the Argaric culture flourished in southeastern Iberia in from 2200 BC to 1550 BC, when depopulation of the area ensued along with disappearing of copper–bronze–arsenic metallurgy. The most accepted model for El Argar has been that of an early state society, most particularly in terms of class division, exploitation, and coercion, with agricultural production, maybe also human labour, controlled by the larger hilltop settlements, and the elite using violence in practical and ideological terms to clamp down on the population. Ecological degradation, landscape opening, fires, pastoralism, and maybe tree cutting for mining have been suggested as reasons for the collapse.

The culture of the motillas, developed an early system of groundwater supply plants (the so-called motillas) in the upper Guadiana basin (in Iberian Peninsula's southern meseta) in a context of extreme aridification in the area in the wake of the 4.2-kiloyear climatic event, which roughly coincided with the transition from the Copper Age to the Bronze Age. Increased precipitation and recovery of the water table from about 1800 BC onward should have led to the forsaking of the motillas (which may have flooded) and the redefinition of the relation of the inhabitants of the territory with the environment, with the development of the Iberian oppida mode of settlement. Beyond local consumption, 2026 research revealed that mining complexes in Extremadura served as a key metallurgical hub for the Atlantic Bronze Age, with copper from the region being identified in artifacts as far north as Scandinavia.

Archaeological cultures of the Iberian Bronze Age include:

- Bell Beaker cuture
- Argaric culture
- Bronze of Levante
- Motillas
- Cogotas I culture
- South-Western Iberian Bronze
- Urnfield culture
- Atlantic Bronze Age
- Tartessos
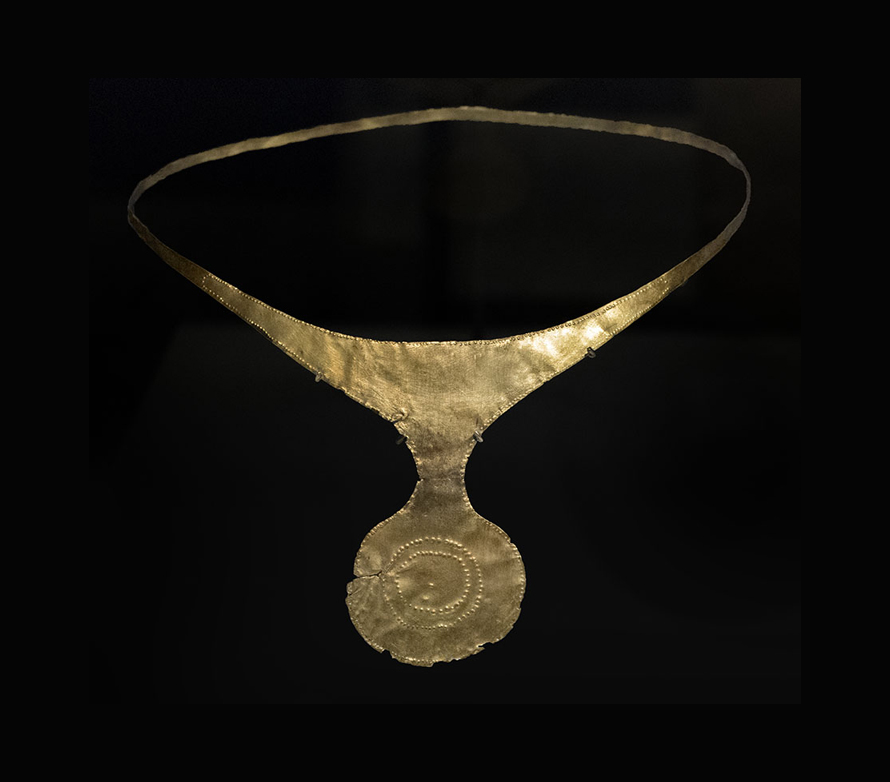
Gold diadem, Argaric culture, Spain, c. 1600 BC

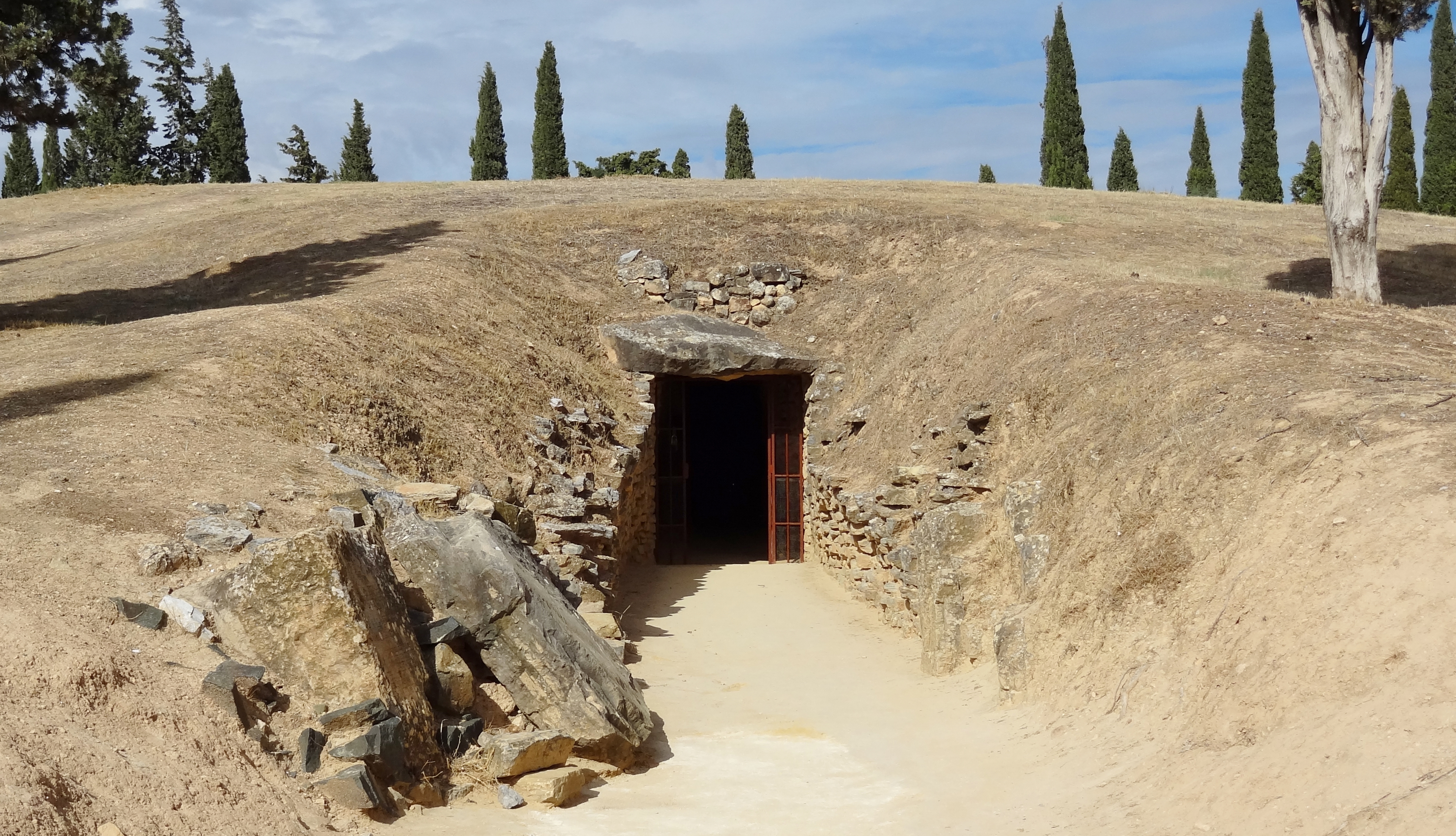
Tholos of El Romeral, Spain, c. 1800 BC

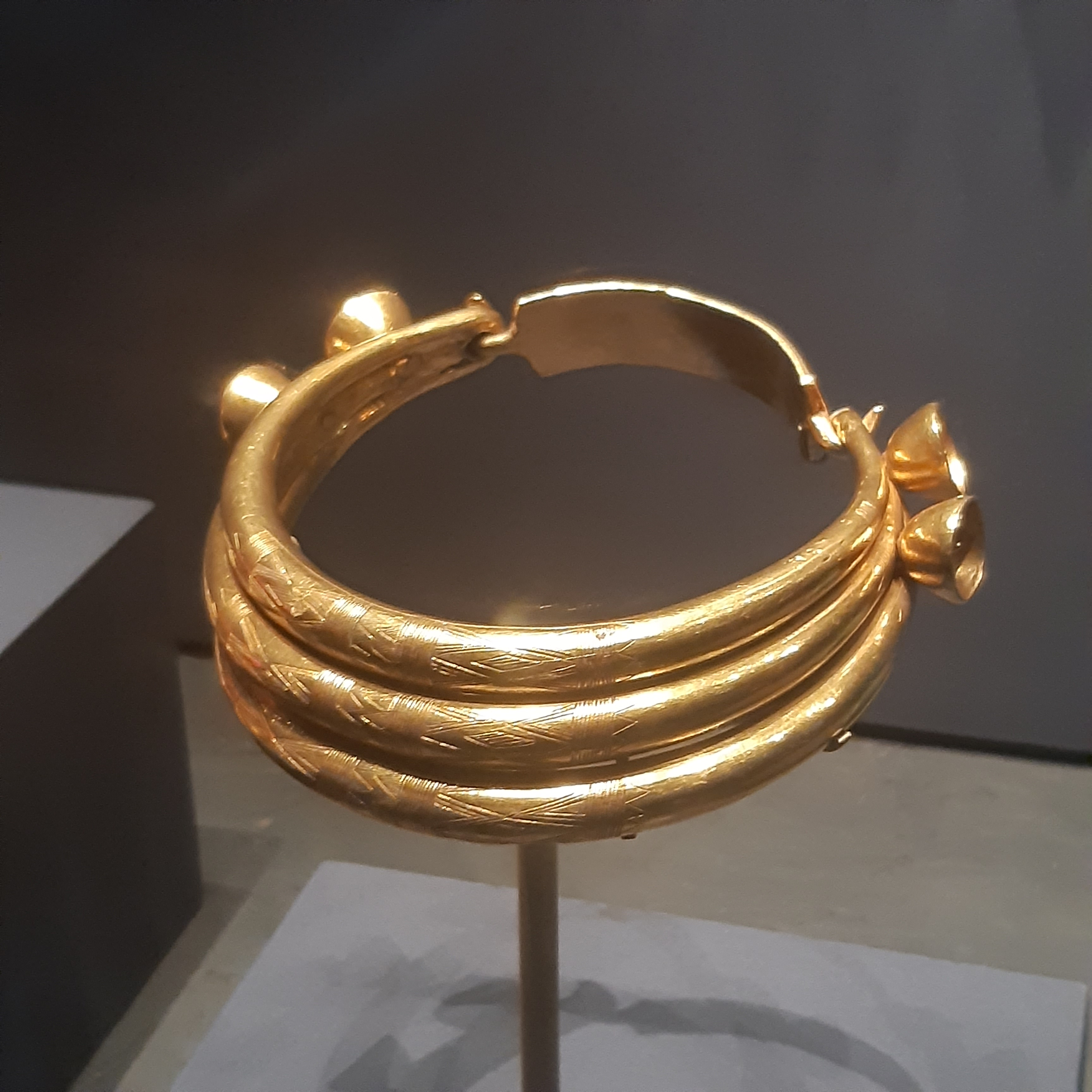
Sintra Collar, Portugal, c. 10th century BC

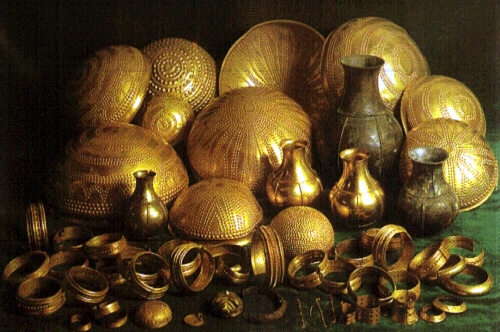
Treasure of Villena, 1300-1000 BC

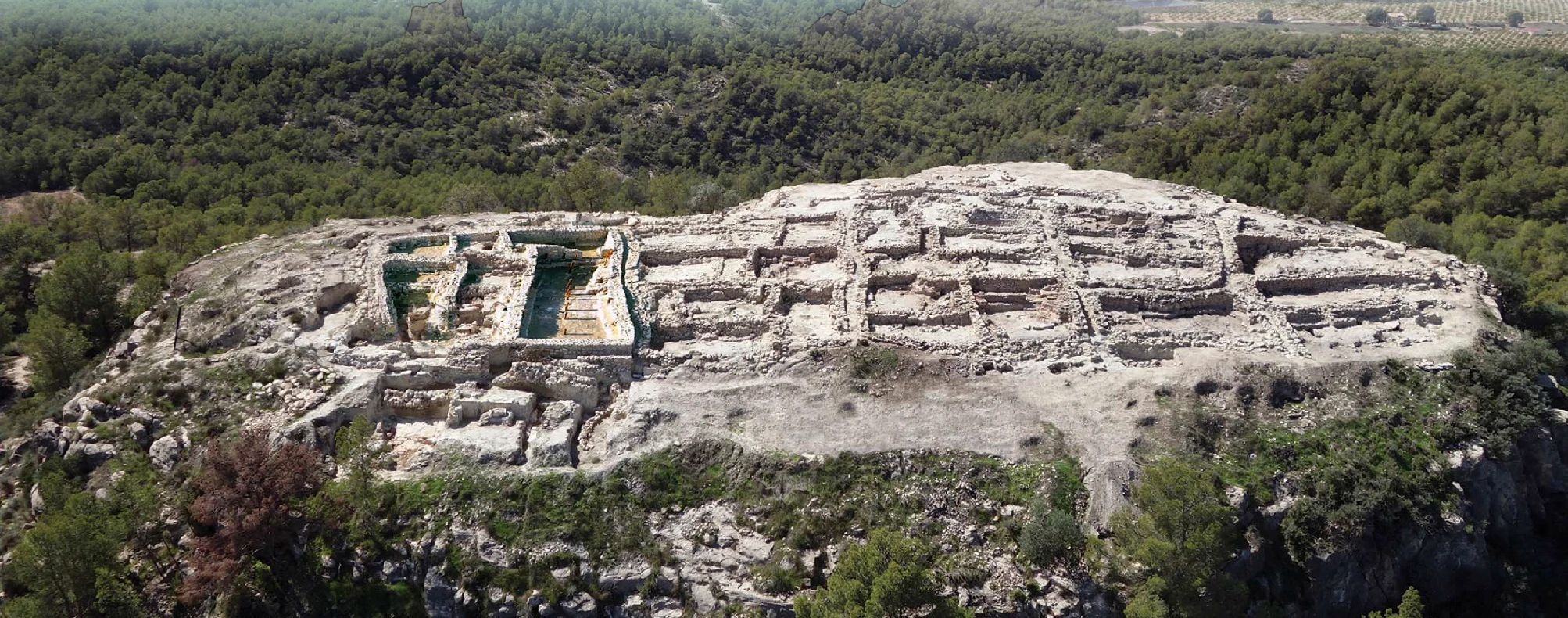
La Almoloya, El Argar, Spain, c. 1700 BC

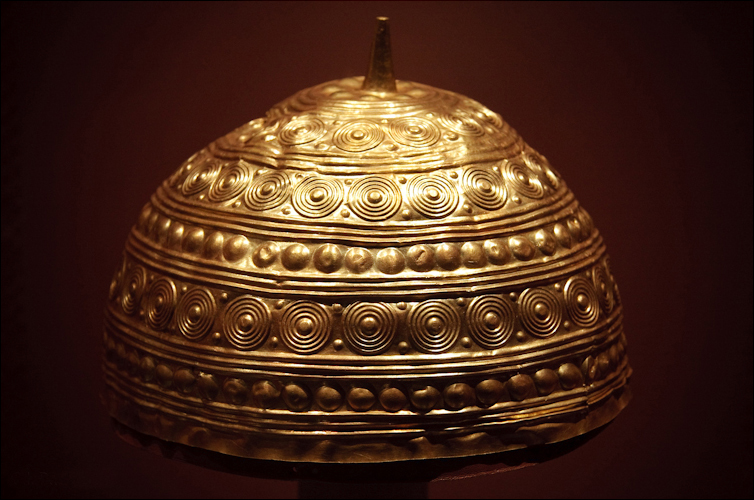
Casco de Leiro, Galicia, Spain. Atlantic Bronze Age, c. 1000 BC

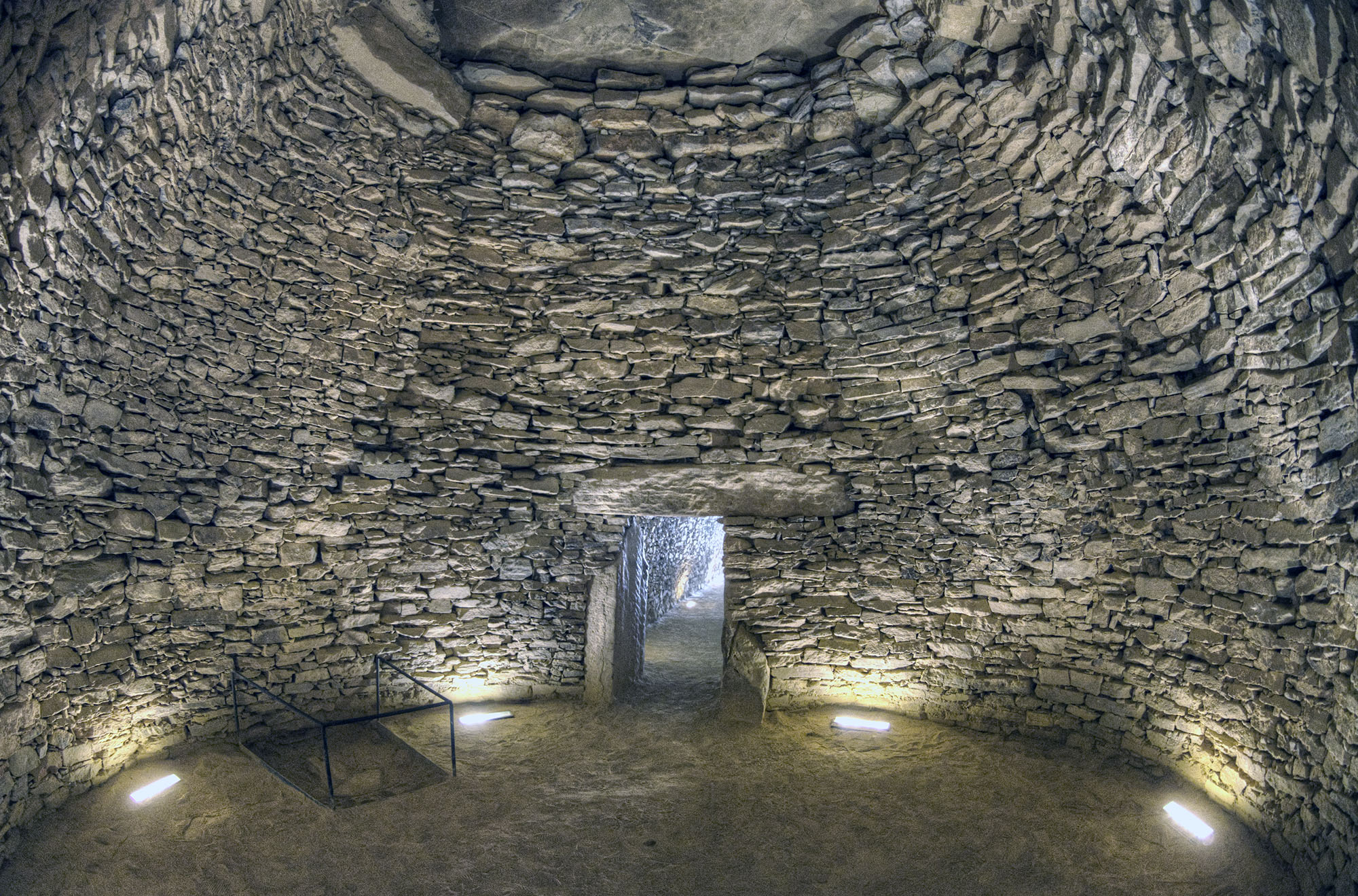
Tholos of El Romeral, Spain, c. 1800 BC

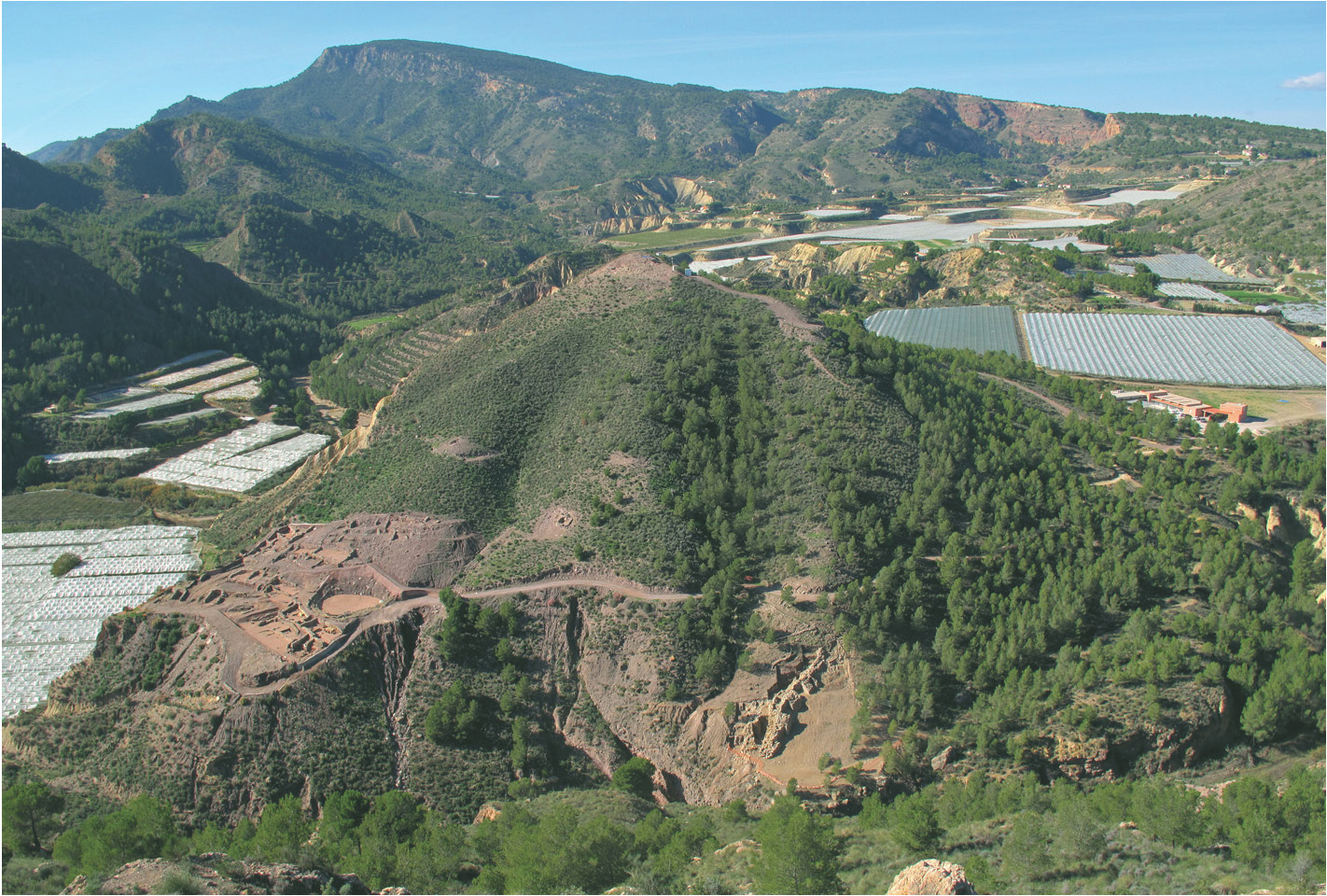
La Bastida de Totana, El Argar, Spain, c. 1600 BC

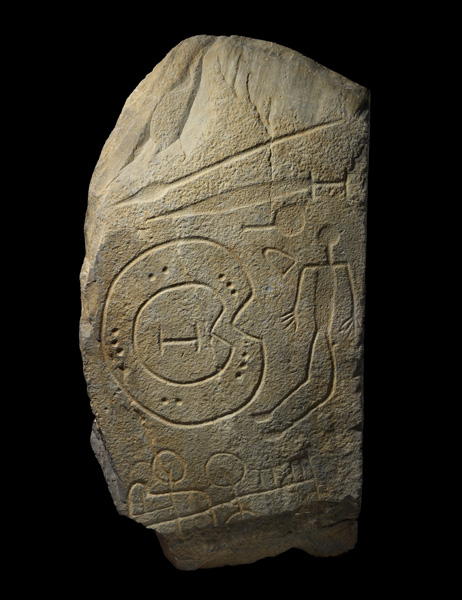
Stele of Solana de Cabañas, Spain.

== Maps ==
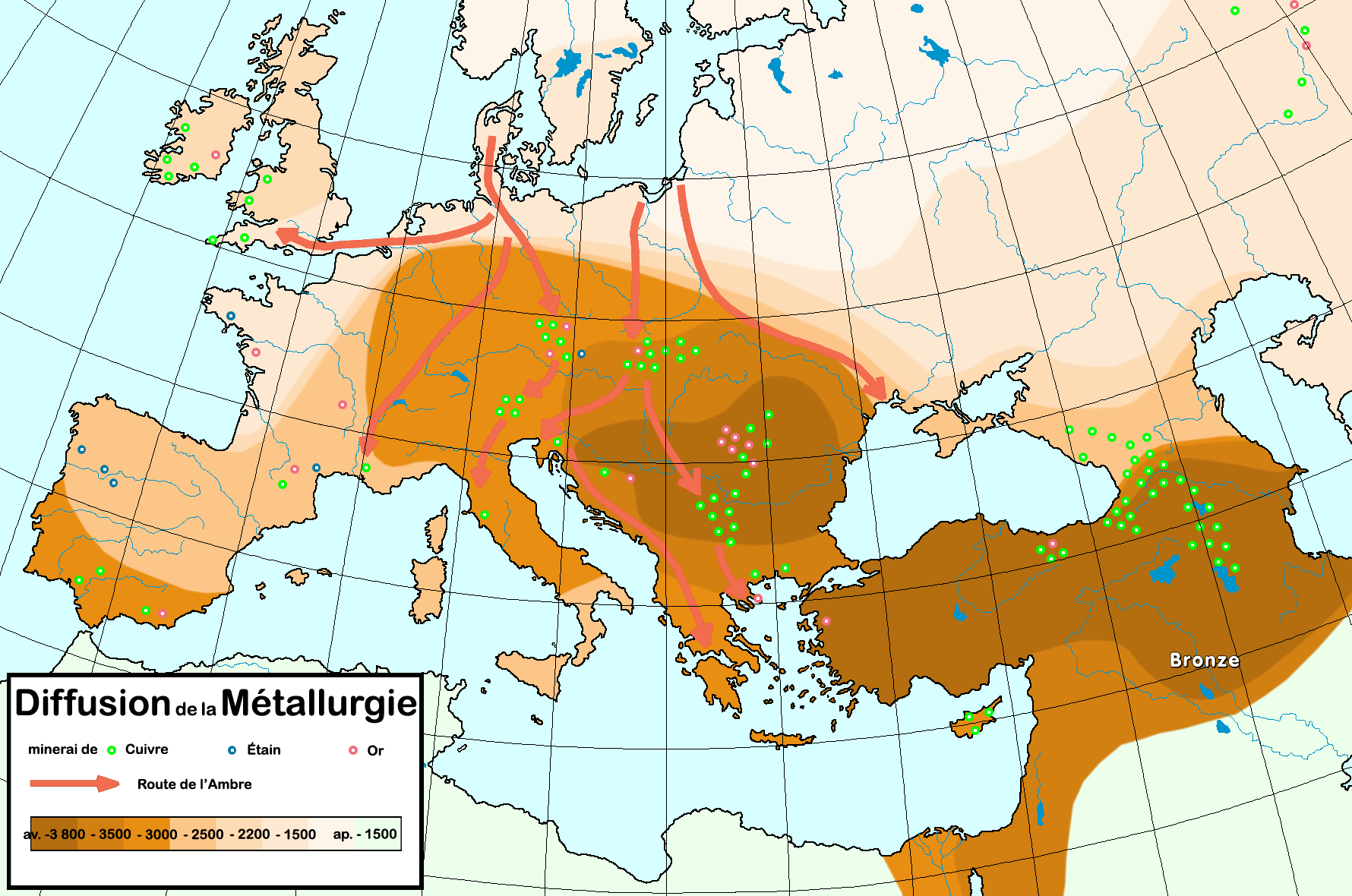
Diffusion of metallurgy in Europe

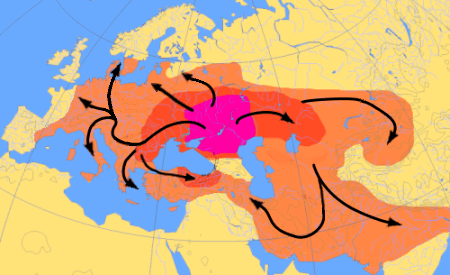
Steppe expansions and migrations

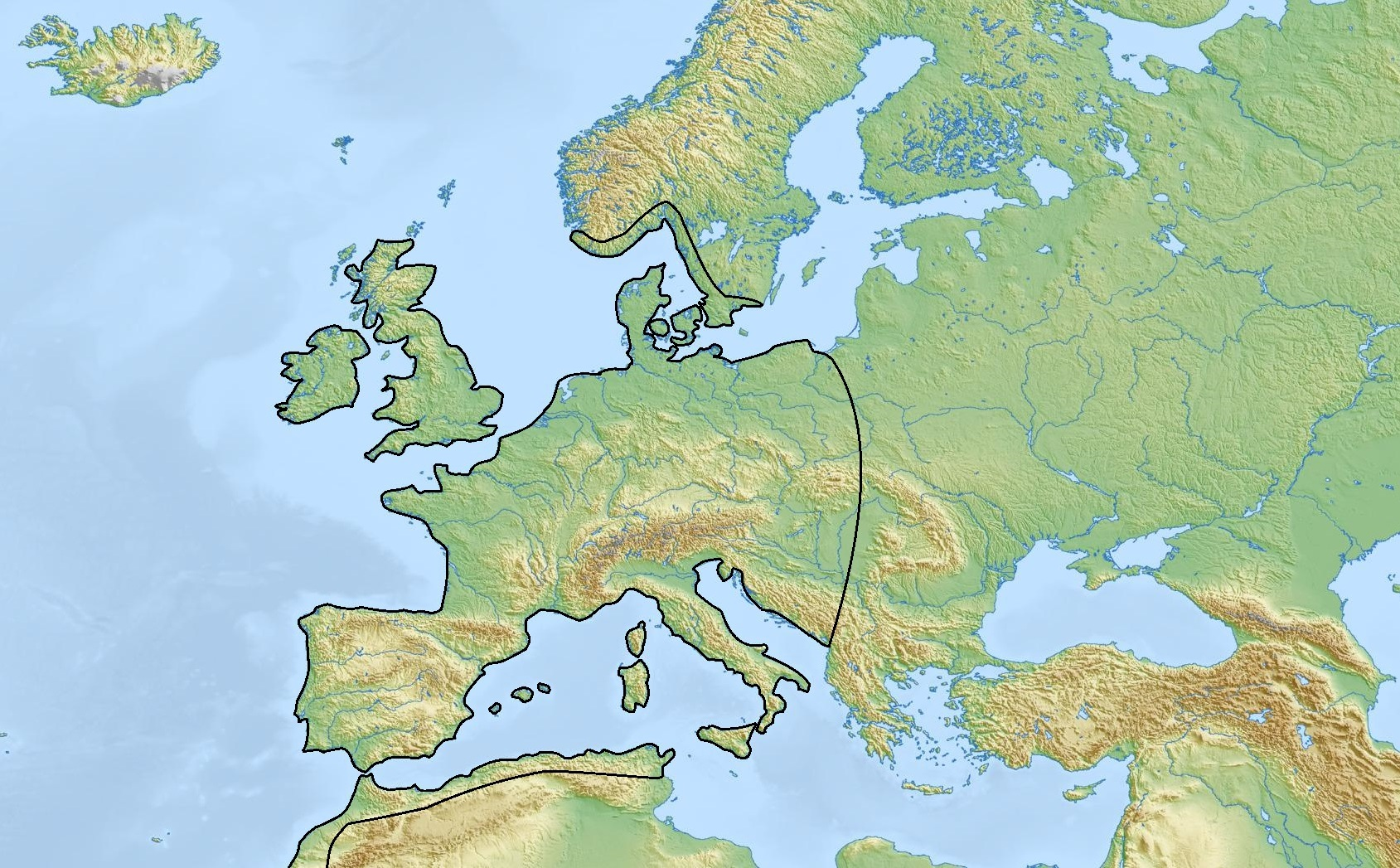
Influence of the Bell Beaker culture

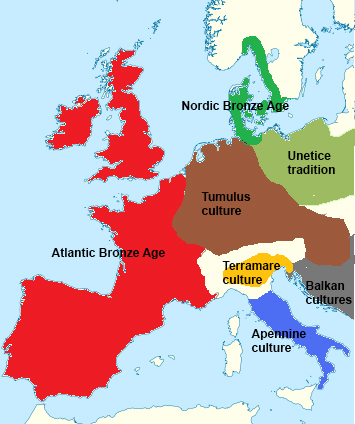
Cultures of the Middle Bronze Age

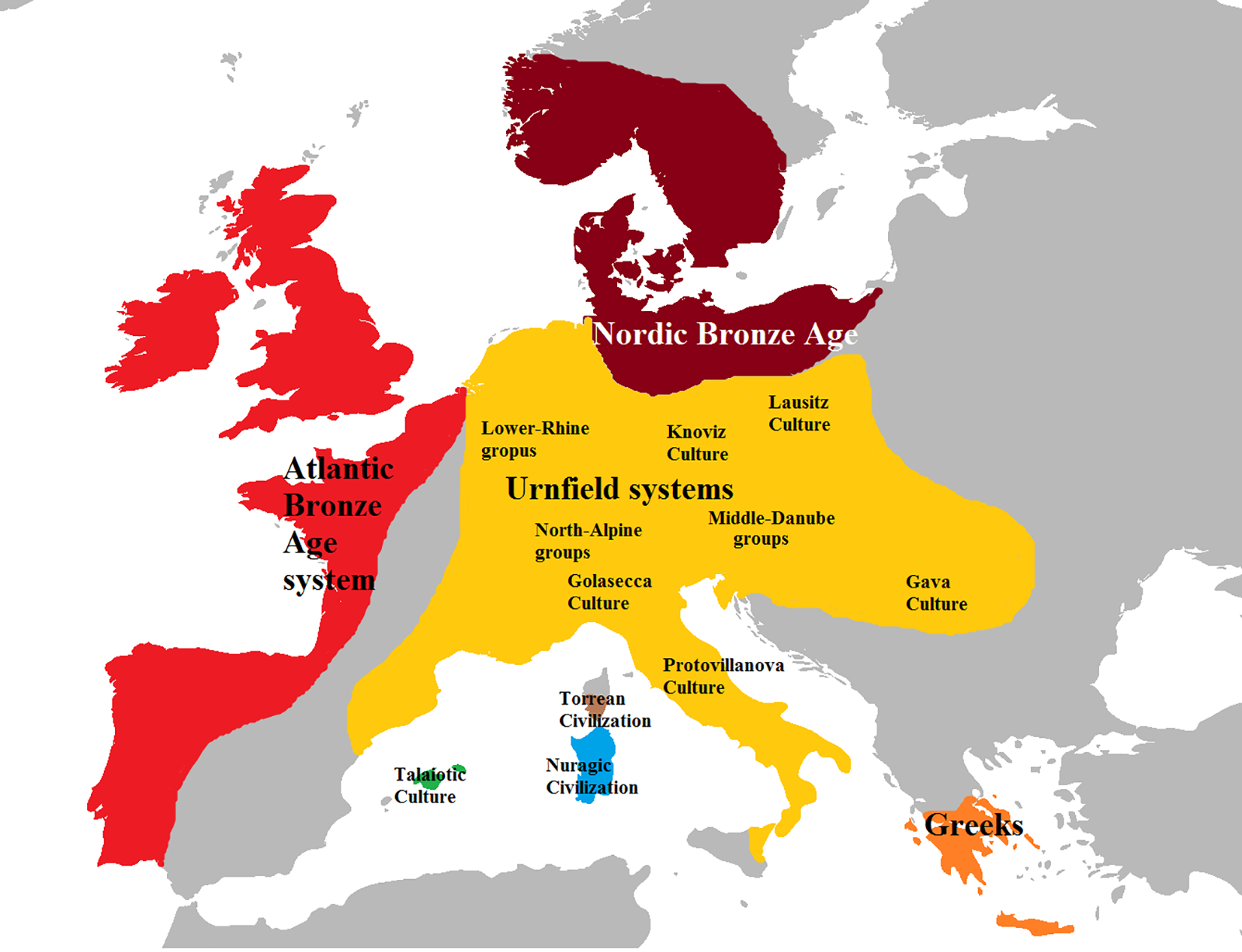
Europe in the Late Bronze Age

The Late Bronze Age collapse

== See also ==
- Chariot burial
- Megalithic tomb
- Old European hydronymy
- Helladic chronology
- Nordic Bronze Age
- Argaric culture
- Atlantic Bronze Age
