= 1985 DFB-Pokal final =

- Match programme cover
- Event: 1984–85 DFB-Pokal
Bayer Uerdingen	Bayern Munich
2	1
- Date: 26 May 1985
- Venue: Olympiastadion, West Berlin
- Referee: Werner Föckler (Weisenheim am Sand)
- Attendance: 70,398

The 1985 DFB-Pokal final decided the winner of the 1984–85 DFB-Pokal, the 42nd season of Germany's premier knockout football cup competition. It was played on 26 May 1985 at the Olympiastadion in West Berlin. Bayer Uerdingen won the match 2–1 against Bayern Munich to claim their first cup title. This was Bayern's first cup final loss in what was their eighth final.

This match was the first time since 1942 that the cup final was held at the Olympiastadion, where it has taken place every year since.

== Route to the final ==
The DFB-Pokal began with 64 teams in a single-elimination knockout cup competition. There were a total of five rounds leading up to the final. Teams were drawn against each other, and the winner after 90 minutes would advance. If still tied, 30 minutes of extra time was played. If the score was still level, a replay would take place at the original away team's stadium. If still level after 90 minutes, 30 minutes of extra time was played. If the score was still level, a drawing of lots would decide who would advance to the next round.

Note: In all results below, the score of the finalist is given first (H: home; A: away).

Bayer Uerdingen		Round	Bayern Munich
Opponent	Result	1984–85 DFB-Pokal	Opponent	Result
VfB Oldenburg (A)	6–1	Round 1	BV Lüttringhausen (A)	1–0
Fortuna Düsseldorf (H)	2–1	Round 2	Friesen Hänigsen (A)	8–0
SC Geislingen (A)	2–0	Round of 16	Waldhof Mannheim (H)	1–0
Werder Bremen (H)	2–1	Quarter-finals	Bayer Leverkusen (A)	3–1
1. FC Saarbrücken (A)	1–0	Semi-finals	Borussia Mönchengladbach (H)	1–0 (a.e.t.)

== Match ==
=== Details ===
26 May 1985
18:00 CEST

Bayer Uerdingen	2–1	Bayern Munich
Feilzer 9'; Schäfer 66'	Report	Hoeneß 8'

Olympiastadion, West Berlin
Attendance: 70,398
Referee: Werner Föckler (Weisenheim am Sand)

Bayer Uerdingen	Bayern Munich

GK	1	(West Germany) Werner Vollack
RB	2	(West Germany) Karl-Heinz Wöhrlin
CB	5	(West Germany) Matthias Herget (c)
CB	6	(West Germany) Norbert Brinkmann
LB	3	(West Germany) Ludger van de Loo	Booked
DM	4	(West Germany) Wolfgang Funkel
RM	8	(West Germany) Horst Feilzer	Booked	(substituted off) 60'
LM	11	(West Germany) Werner Buttgereit
AM	10	(West Germany) Friedhelm Funkel
CF	9	(Iceland) Lárus Guðmundsson		(substituted off) 82'
CF	7	(West Germany) Wolfgang Schäfer
Substitutes:
MF		(Wales) Wayne Thomas		(substituted on) 82'
FW	12	(West Germany) Peter Loontiens		(substituted on) 60'
Manager:
(West Germany) Karl-Heinz Feldkamp

GK	1	(West Germany) Raimond Aumann
RB	2	(West Germany) Wolfgang Dremmler	(red card) 48'
CB	5	(West Germany) Klaus Augenthaler (c)
CB	4	(West Germany) Norbert Eder
LB	3	(West Germany) Holger Willmer		(substituted off) 71'
CM	8	(West Germany) Lothar Matthäus	Booked
CM	6	(Denmark) Søren Lerby
CM	7	(West Germany) Hans Pflügler
RF	10	(West Germany) Roland Wohlfarth		(substituted off) 51'
CF	9	(West Germany) Dieter Hoeneß	Booked
LF	11	(West Germany) Ludwig Kögl
Substitutes:
DF	12	(West Germany) Bertram Beierlorzer		(substituted on) 51'
FW	14	(West Germany) Michael Rummenigge		(substituted on) 71'
Manager:
(West Germany) Udo Lattek

Match rules

- 90 minutes.
- 30 minutes of extra time if necessary.
- Penalty shoot-out if scores still level.
- Maximum of two substitutions.
