= 1984–85 DFB-Pokal =

Tournament details
- Country: West Germany
- Teams: 64

Final positions
- Champions: Bayer 05 Uerdingen
- Runners-up: FC Bayern Munich

Tournament statistics
- Matches played: 67

The 1984–85 DFB-Pokal was the 42nd season of the annual German football cup competition. It began on 31 August 1984 and ended on 26 May 1985. 64 teams competed in the tournament of six rounds. In the final Bayer 05 Uerdingen defeated title holders Bayern Munich 2–1.

== Matches ==
=== First round ===
31 August 1984	FV 08 Duisburg	1–4	SV Waldhof Mannheim	Duisburg
	Lohmann 68'	report (in German)	Sebert 50' (pen.); Walter 55', 85'; Gaudino 80'	Stadium: Grunewald-Kampfbahn; Attendance: 2.000; Referee: Willi Beuth (Bebdurg)

31 August 1984	VfB Stuttgart	5–4	Rot-Weiß Oberhausen	Stuttgart
	Klinsmann 6'; Niedermayer 10'; Claesen 64' (pen.); Reichert 70'; Förster 83'	report (in German)	Dauber 1', 22'; Burgsmüller 39'; Runge 45'	Stadium: Neckarstadion; Attendance: 4.500; Referee: Manfred Neuner (Leimen)

31 August 1984	VfL Osnabrück	2–5 (a.e.t.)	TSV Friesen Hänigsen	Osnabrück
	Kalkbrenner 2'; Bohne 12'	report (in German)	Mosert 35', 102', 105'; Pöttgen 77'; Frank 100'	Stadium: Stadion an der Bremer Brücke; Attendance: 2.000; Referee: Joachim Ren (Salzgitter)

1 September 1984	TSV Havelse	2–2 (a.e.t.)	VfL Bochum	Garbsen
	Stoffregen 70' (pen.); Zerr 113'	report (in German)	Woelk 26'; Schreier 96'	Stadium: Wilhelm-Langrehr-Stadion; Attendance: 2.500; Referee: Uwe Kasperowski (West Berlin)

1 September 1984	VfL Kellinghusen	1–4	SG Union Solingen
	Freese 73' (pen.)	report (in German)	Hotić 6', 20'; Dum 46'; Glindemann 49' (o.g.)	Attendance: 1.200; Referee: Friedrich Retzmann (Pinneberg)

1 September 1984	ASC Dudweiler	1–5	Borussia Dortmund	Saarbrücken
	Marcinkowski 7'	report (in German)	Wegmann 37', 83'; Schüler 55', 68'; Klotz 81'	Stadium: Ludwigsparkstadion; Attendance: 1.600; Referee: Rothbrust (Mayen)

1 September 1984	SV Darmstadt 98	3–0	SC Freiburg	Darmstadt
	Emig 18'; Kuhl 44'; Krajczy 63'	report (in German)		Stadium: Stadion am Böllenfalltor; Attendance: 1.900; Referee: Robert Walz (Waiblingen)

1 September 1984	DSC Arminia Bielefeld	1–3 (a.e.t.)	1. FC Nürnberg	Bielefeld
	Ozaki 96'	report (in German)	Brunner 100' (pen.); Güttler 112'; Weyerich 118'	Stadium: Alm; Attendance: 4.000; Referee: Joachim Kautschor (Eschweiler)

1 September 1984	SC Geislingen	2–0	Hamburger SV	Geislingen an der Steige
	W. Haug 29'; K. Perfetto 71'	report (in German)		Stadium: Stadion im Eybacher Tal; Attendance: 7.000; Referee: Manfred Probst (Waldsassen)

1 September 1984	SC Jülich 1910	2–1	FC Rastatt
	Bertrams 31'; Nehl 75'	report (in German)	Köppel 89'	Attendance: 700; Referee: Hans Puchalski (Duisburg)

1 September 1984	Altonaer FC 93	2–1	Eintracht Trier
	Knodel 26'; Dämmich 39'	report (in German)	Theis 86'	Attendance: 900; Referee: Neukirch (Brunsbüttel)

1 September 1984	Bayer 04 Leverkusen	5–0	1. FC Kaiserslautern	Leverkusen
	Cha 10'; Schreier 45', 69'; Waas 60'; Winklhofer 88'	report (in German)		Stadium: Ulrich Haberland Stadion; Attendance: 6.000; Referee: Hans-Joachim Osmers (Bremen)

1 September 1984	1. FC Paderborn	1–4	Hannover 96
	Fischer 74'	report (in German)	Giesel 48'; Gue 67'; Hartmann 70' (pen.); Gerber 79'	Attendance: 3.000; Referee: Horst Hellwig (Sandershausen)

1 September 1984	1. FC Köln	8–0	Stuttgarter Kickers	Cologne
	Allofs 8', 20', 62'; Hartwig 30'; Strack 47'; Hobday 57' (o.g.); Lehnhoff 83'; Dickel 85'	report (in German)		Stadium: Radrennbahn Müngersdorf; Attendance: 4.000; Referee: Peter Gabor (West Berlin)

1 September 1984	Borussia Mönchengladbach	4–1	Blau-Weiß 90 Berlin
	Borowka 5'; Mill 39', 87'; Hochstätter 44'	report (in German)	Hellmann 23'	Attendance: 4.800; Referee: Werner Schütte (Gelsenkirchen)

1 September 1984	TSV Ofterdingen	0–1	VfL Bochum II
		report (in German)	R. Zagorny 45'	Attendance: 800; Referee: Windsperger (Reichenberg)

1 September 1984	Rot-Weiß Essen	1–2	1. FC Saarbrücken	Essen
	Rudicz 57'	report (in German)	Muntubila 70'; Jambo 75'	Stadium: Georg-Melches Stadion; Attendance: 45.000; Referee: Bernd Kruse (Beckum)

1 September 1984	FC Olympia Bocholt	1–3	FC Schalke 04	Bocholt
	Jakovljevic 39'	report (in German)	Jakobs 1'; Thon 46', 73'	Stadium: Stadion am Hünting; Attendance: 8.000; Referee: Karl-Josef Assenmacher (Fischenich)

1 September 1984	Eintracht Braunschweig	1–3	Eintracht Frankfurt	Braunschweig
	Lux 76' (pen.)	report (in German)	Falkenmayer 29'; Müller 44'; Tobollik 58'	Stadium: Stadion an der Hamburger Straße; Attendance: 7.200; Referee: Udo Horeis (Hamburg)

1 September 1984	SpVgg Bayreuth	7–0	SV 1920 Mettlach	Bayreuth
	Besl 13'; Thanner 50', 82'; Scheler 53', 73', 84', 90'	report (in German)		Stadium: Hans-Walter-Wild-Stadion; Attendance: 1.100; Referee: Neukirch (Brunsbüttel)

1 September 1984	1. FC Nürnberg II	1–0	SV Südwest Ludwigshafen
	Lähr 28' (o.g.)	report (in German)		Attendance: 600; Referee: Bauer (Ulm)

1 September 1984	Hertha BSC	1–0	KSV Hessen Kassel	West Berlin
	Clute-Simon 34'	report (in German)		Stadium: Olympiastadion; Attendance: 6.400; Referee: Wiesel (Hildesheim)

2 September 1984	VfB Oldenburg	1–6	Bayer 05 Uerdingen	Oldenburg
	Bartels 53'	report (in German)	W. Funkel 18'; F. Funkel 40'; Feilzer 72' van de Loo 76'; Gulich 77', 86'	Stadium: Marschweg-Stadion; Attendance: 8.000; Referee: Horst Krohn (Hamburg)

2 September 1984	BV 08 Lüttringhausen	0–1	FC Bayern Munich	Remscheid
		report (in German)	Wohlfarth 10'	Stadium: Röntgen-Stadion; Attendance: 15.000; Referee: Günter Risse (Hattingen)

2 September 1984	SC Herford	2–3	Kickers Offenbach	Herford
	Trapp 27' (o.g.); Kaiser 79'	report (in German)	Höfer 22'; Grünewald 31'; Neun 86'	Stadium: Friedrich-Ludwig-Jahn-Stadion; Attendance: 2.000; Referee: Resiger (Damme)

2 September 1984	SV Schwetzingen	1–2	Alemannia Aachen
	Elias 88'	report (in German)	Olck 13'; Poqué 73'	Attendance: 1.500; Referee: Schäfer (Oggerheim)

2 September 1984	Fortuna Köln	2–2 (a.e.t.)	MSV Duisburg
	Gores 80'; Baier 83'	report (in German)	Abramczik 32', 73'	Attendance: 1.900; Referee: Gerhard Theobald (Neunkirchen)

2 September 1984	Eintracht Haiger	2–1 (a.e.t.)	CSC 03 Kassel
	Hartung 50'; Ringsdorf 119'	report (in German)	Grawunder 77'	Attendance: 1.500; Referee: Dieter Birlenbach (Hattenheim)

2 September 1984	SC Charlottenburg	1–3 (a.e.t.)	Karlsruher SC
	Marczewski 18'	report (in German)	Günther 29', 93'; Nadu 117'	Attendance: 8.000; Referee: Heinen (Wardenburg)

2 September 1984	FC Bayern Munich II	3–5	SG Wattenscheid 09
	Schwabl 20', 38'; Alt 22'	report (in German)	Steiner 5'; Drews 18', 50', 80'; Kügler 25'	Attendance: 500; Referee: Striegel (Bahlingen)

2 September 1984	OSC Bremerhaven	0–4	SV Werder Bremen
		report (in German)	Möhlmann 22', 37'; Reinders 54' (pen.); Otten 87'	Attendance: 5.500; Referee: Wilfred Diekert (Hamburg)

2 September 1984	Fortuna Düsseldorf	2–0	SSV Ulm 1846	Düsseldorf
	Fach 7'; Weikl 53'	report (in German)		Stadium: Rheinstadion; Attendance: 4.000; Referee: Werner (Auersmacher)

==== Replays ====
25 September 1984	VfL Bochum	4–0	TSV Havelse	Bochum
	Lameck 4'; Kuntz 25', 36' (pen.), 48'	report (in German)		Stadium: Ruhrstadion; Attendance: 2.000; Referee: Hans Puchalski (Duisburg)

2 October 1984	MSV Duisburg	2–2 (a.e.t.) (3–5 p)	Fortuna Köln
	Schacht 81'; Abramczik 110'	report (in German)	Gede 79', 117'	Attendance: 2.000; Referee: Neuner (Leimen)
	Penalties
	(penalty scored) Abramczik; (penalty scored) Struckmann; (penalty scored) Dubski; (penalty missed) Pesic		(penalty scored) Kuntze; (penalty scored) Grabosch; (penalty scored) Gede; (penalty scored) Gores; (penalty scored) Richter

=== Second round ===
13 October 1984	Borussia Dortmund	1–1 (a.e.t.)	FC Schalke 04	Dortmund
	Dreßel 120'	report (in German)	Schatzschneider 96'	Stadium: Westfalenstadion; Attendance: 37.000; Referee: Dieter Pauly (Rheydt)

20 November 1984	Bayer 05 Uerdingen	2–1	Fortuna Düsseldorf	Krefeld
	Schäfer 53'; Feilzer 68'	report (in German)	Bockenfeld 78'	Stadium: Grotenburg-Stadion; Attendance: 9.400; Referee: Adolf Ermer (Weiden)

20 November 1984	VfL Bochum II	1–2	VfB Stuttgart	Bochum
	Niedzwicki 78'	report (in German)	Allgöwer 33'; Ohlicher 66'	Stadium: Lohrheidestadion; Attendance: 2.000; Referee: Hans-Gerd Kohnen (Hückelhoven)

20 November 1984	SpVgg Bayreuth	1–2	SG Union Solingen	Bayreuth
	Gebhardt 59'	report (in German)	Dum 5'; Römer 77'	Stadium: Hans-Walter-Wild-Stadion; Attendance: 4.000; Referee: Horst Hellwig (Sandershausen)

21 November 1984	TSV Friesen Hänigsen	0–8	FC Bayern Munich
		report (in German)	Rummenigge 28', 67'; Augenthaler 31'; Hoeneß 44'; Lerby 52'; Nachtweih 56', 58'; Willmer 85'	Attendance: 16.000; Referee: Wahlmann (Recklinghausen)

21 November 1984	1. FC Nürnberg II	0–3	SC Jülich 1910
		report (in German)	Bertrams 23', 53'; Nehl 42'	Attendance: 700; Referee: Klaus Bodmer (Nattheim)

21 November 1984	SC Geislingen	4–2	Kickers Offenbach
	Owczarek 32'; W. Haug 44'; Schöbel 66'; K. Perfetto 85'	report (in German)	Augst 84'; Höfer 90'	Attendance: 4.500; Referee: Peter Vasel (Fürth)

21 November 1984	Altonaer FC 93	0–3	Bayer 04 Leverkusen
		report (in German)	Cha 26', 69'; Götz 76'	Attendance: 3.000; Referee: Ruppelt (West Berlin)

21 November 1984	Eintracht Haiger	1–0 (a.e.t.)	Karlsruher SC
	Waldschmidt 100'	report (in German)		Attendance: 4.000; Referee: Peter Müller (Nochern)

21 November 1984	SG Wattenscheid 09	0–4	SV Waldhof Mannheim	Bochum
		report (in German)	Makan 55'; Drews 70' (o.g.); Walter 76', 89'	Stadium: Lohrheidestadion; Attendance: 4.000; Referee: Wolf-Rüdiger Umbach (Rottdorf)

21 November 1984	SV Werder Bremen	5–0	SV Darmstadt 98	Bremen
	Neubarth 24', 42'; Reinders 27'; Pezzey 37'; Völler 43'	report (in German)		Stadium: Weserstadion; Attendance: 4.500; Referee: Hans-Jürgen Weber (Essen)

21 November 1984	1. FC Saarbrücken	4–1	1. FC Nürnberg	Saarbrücken
	Jambo 38', 39' (pen.); Hönnscheidt 60'; Seel 88'	report (in German)	Stenzel 46'	Stadium: Ludwigsparkstadion; Attendance: 10.000; Referee: Walter Stark (Troisdorf)

21 November 1984	Borussia Mönchengladbach	4–2 (a.e.t.)	Eintracht Frankfurt
	Criens 1'; Rahn 64' (pen.); Krauss 102'; Lienen 105'	report (in German)	Körbel 34'; Müller 86'	Attendance: 20.000; Referee: Wilfried Heitmann (Drentwede)

21 November 1984	Alemannia Aachen	3–0	VfL Bochum	Aachen
	Habig 56'; Thomas 66'; Willkomm 78'	report (in German)		Stadium: Tivoli; Attendance: 24.000; Referee: Anton Matheis (Rodalben)

21 November 1984	Hannover 96	2–1	1. FC Köln	Hannover
	Surmann 32'; Gue 66'	report (in German)	Littbarski 43'	Stadium: Niedersachsenstadion; Attendance: 55.000; Referee: Hans-Peter Dellwing (Trier)

21 November 1984	Hertha BSC	4–3 (a.e.t.)	Fortuna Köln	West Berlin
	Glöde 11'; Timme 66'; Ehrmantraut 99'; Clute-Simon 105'	report (in German)	Kurtenbach 24', 106'; Gores 48'	Stadium: Olympiastadion; Attendance: 7.600; Referee: Zimmermann (Kiel)

==== Replay ====
31 October 1984	FC Schalke 04	3–2	Borussia Dortmund	Gelsenkirchen
	Dietz 42'; Dierßen 61', 82'	report (in German)	Anderbrügge 3'; Wegmann 86'	Stadium: Parkstadion; Attendance: 45.000; Referee: Wilfried Brückner (Darmstadt)

=== Round of 16 ===
4 December 1984	FC Bayern Munich	1–0	SV Waldhof Mannheim	Munich
	Hoeneß 73'	report (in German)		Stadium: Olympiastadion; Attendance: 12.500; Referee: Wolf-Dieter Ahlenfelder (Oberhausen)

12 December 1984	SC Jülich 1910	2–4	SV Werder Bremen
	Nehl 21'; Bertrams 61'	report (in German)	Reinders 7'; Sidka 13'; Pezzey 43'; Meier 74'	Attendance: 5.000; Referee: Rainer Waltert (Paderborn)

22 December 1984	SC Geislingen	0–2	Bayer 05 Uerdingen
		report (in German)	Herget 87'; Schäfer 90'	Attendance: 6.000; Referee: Hans Scheuerer (Munich)

22 December 1984	Eintracht Haiger	0–8	SG Union Solingen
		report (in German)	Jurgeleit 11', 62', 77'; Dum 29', 72', 79'; Trapp 59'; Dettmer 84'	Attendance: 4.900; Referee: Hans-Jürgen Kasper (Katlenburg)

22 December 1984	Hannover 96	1–0	FC Schalke 04	Hannover
	Schaub 77'	report (in German)		Stadium: Niedersachsenstadion; Attendance: 60.000; Referee: Dieter Niebergall (Ramsbach)

22 December 1984	Alemannia Aachen	0–2	Borussia Mönchengladbach	Aachen
		report (in German)	Criens 67', 76'	Stadium: Tivoli; Attendance: 26.400; Referee: Volker Roth (Salzgitter)

22 December 1984	VfB Stuttgart	0–0 (a.e.t.)	1. FC Saarbrücken	Stuttgart
		report (in German)		Stadium: Neckarstadion; Attendance: 10.700; Referee: Rainer Jupe (Traisa)

5 February 1985	Hertha BSC	0–4	Bayer 04 Leverkusen	West Berlin
		report (in German)	Giske 10'; Waas 26', 33'; Schreier 84'	Stadium: Olympiastadion; Attendance: 7.600; Referee: Hans-Heinrich Barnick (Schenfeld)

==== Replay ====
6 February 1985	1. FC Saarbrücken	2–2 (a.e.t.) (3–0 p)	VfB Stuttgart	Saarbrücken
	Hönnscheidt 42'; Blättel 87'	report (in German)	Kempe 14'; Klinsmann 79'	Stadium: Ludwigsparkstadion; Attendance: 25.000; Referee: Werner Föckler (Bad Dürkheim)
	Penalties
	(penalty scored) Jambo; (penalty scored) Blättel; (penalty scored) Schlegel		(penalty missed) Allgöwer; (penalty missed) Förster; (penalty missed) Reichert

=== Quarter-finals ===
16 February 1985	SG Union Solingen	1–2	Borussia Mönchengladbach
	Diekmann 52'	report (in German)	Bruns 44'; Rahn 66'	Attendance: 15.500; Referee: Wolf-Günter Wiesel (Ottbergen)

16 February 1985	1. FC Saarbrücken	1–0	Hannover 96	Saarbrücken
	Blättel 75'	report (in German)		Stadium: Ludwigsparkstadion; Attendance: 26.000; Referee: Manfred Uhlig (Dortmund)

12 March 1985	Bayer 05 Uerdingen	2–1	SV Werder Bremen	Krefeld
	Herget 47'; Gudmundsson 53'	report (in German)	Reinders 43'	Stadium: Grotenburg-Stadion; Attendance: 15.000; Referee: Werner Föckler (Bad Dürkheim)

26 March 1985	Bayer 04 Leverkusen	1–3	FC Bayern Munich
	Cha 53'	report (in German)	Wohlfarth 4', 40'; Mathy 71'	Attendance: 17.000; Referee: Franz-Josef Hontheim (Trier)

=== Semi-finals ===
6 April 1985	1. FC Saarbrücken	0–1	Bayer 05 Uerdingen	Saarbrücken
		report (in German)	Brinkmann 74'	Stadium: Ludwigsparkstadion; Attendance: 32.000; Referee: Aron Schmidhuber (Ottobrunn)

8 April 1985	FC Bayern Munich	1–0 (a.e.t.)	Borussia Mönchengladbach	Munich
	Lerby 101' (pen.)	report (in German)		Stadium: Olympiastadion; Attendance: 52.000; Referee: Wilfried Heitmann (Drentwede)

=== Final ===
26 May 1985
18:00 CEST

Bayer Uerdingen	2–1	Bayern Munich
Feilzer 9'; Schäfer 66'	Report	Hoeneß 8'

Olympiastadion, West Berlin
Attendance: 70,398
Referee: Werner Föckler (Weisenheim am Sand)
