= Robert Wayne Thomas =

Robert Wayne Thomas may refer to:

- Robert Thomas (linebacker) (born 1980), American football player
- Wayne Thomas (ice hockey) (1947–2025), Canadian ice hockey player

== See also ==
- Robert Thomas (disambiguation)
- Robert Wayne Thomason (1952–1995), American mathematician
- Wayne Thomas (disambiguation)
