= Avanton Gold Cone =

Bronze Age artefact

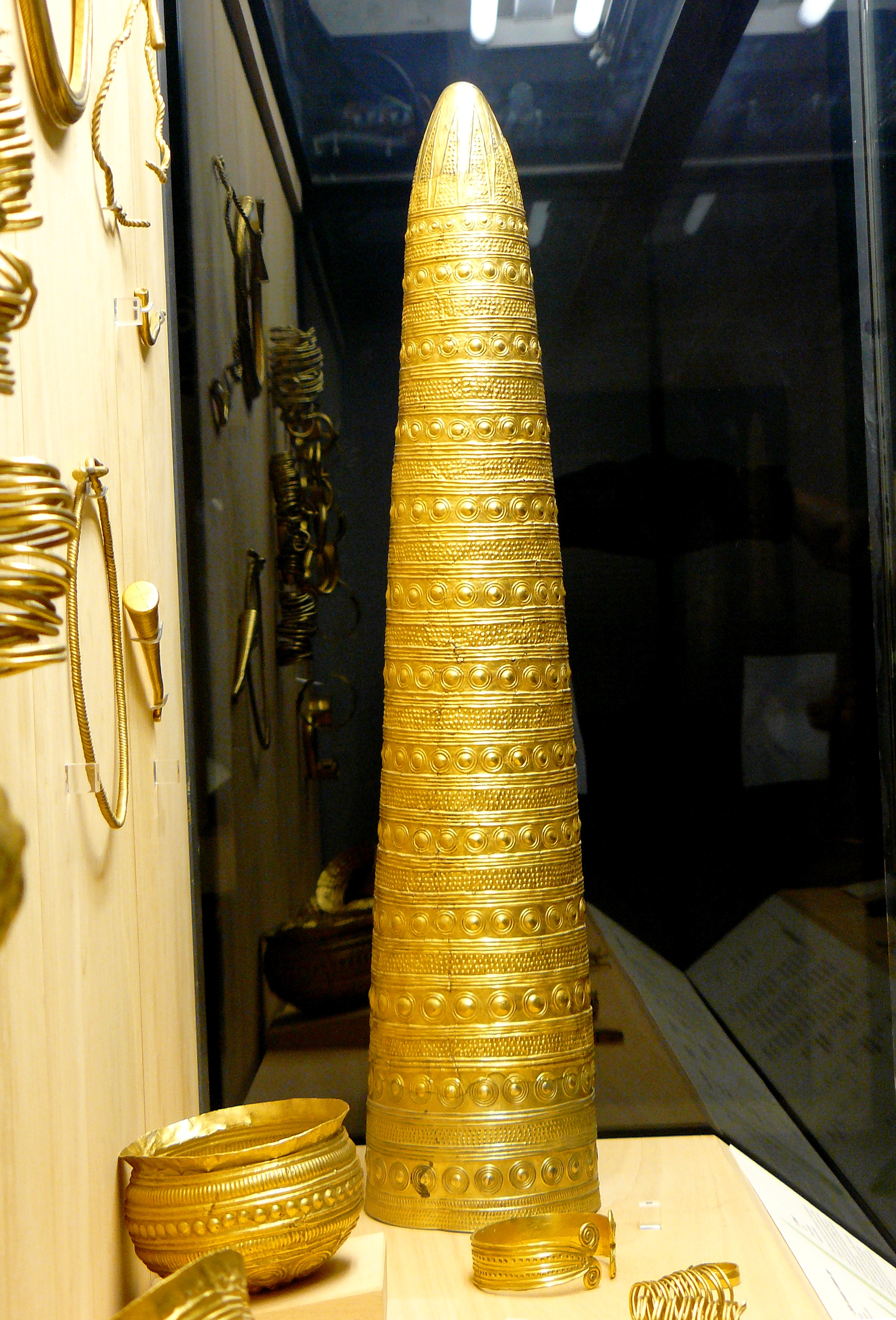
- Material: Gold
- Height: 55 cm
- Created: c. 950 BC
- Discovered: 1844; Nouvelle-Aquitaine, France
- Present location: Saint-Germain-en-Laye, Ile-de-France, France

The Avanton Gold Cone, Avanton Cone (French: Cône d'Or d'Avanton, Cône d'Avanton), or Avanton gold hat is a late Bronze Age artefact, belonging to the group of Golden hats, only four of which are known so far.

The Avanton Cone was the second such object to be discovered (after the Golden Hat of Schifferstadt). It was found in 1844 in a field near the village of Avanton, about 12 kilometres (7 mi) north of Poitiers, France. The object was damaged; comparison with other finds suggests that a part (the brim) is missing. The remaining part of the Avanton cone is 55-centimetre (22 in) long and weighs 285 grams (10 oz). Originally dated to the Middle Bronze and suggested to be a fertility symbol, it now appears to be of later date and more complex function (see Golden hats).

The Avanton Cone is on display in the Musée d'Archéologie Nationale at Saint-Germain-en-Laye, near Paris.

== See also ==
- Golden hats
- Berlin Gold Hat, c. 1,000–800 BC
- Golden Hat of Schifferstadt, c. 1,400–1,300 BC
- Golden Cone of Ezelsdorf-Buch, c. 1,000–800 BC
