= Avanton =

- Commune
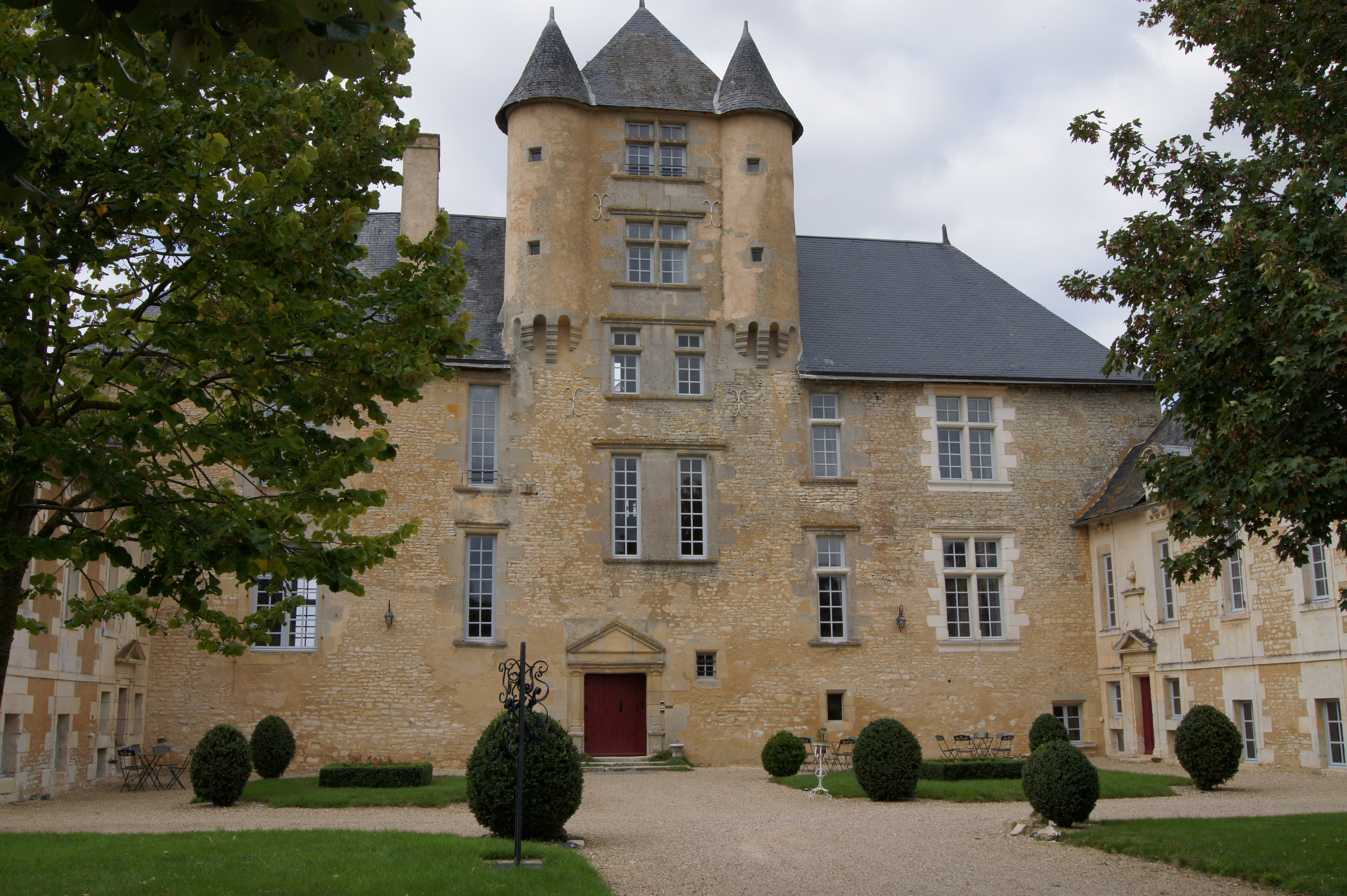
- The Château of Avanton
- Location of Avanton
- Location within France Location within Nouvelle-Aquitaine
- Coordinates: 46°39′49″N 0°18′16″E
- Country: France
- Region: Nouvelle-Aquitaine
- Department: Vienne
- Arrondissement: Poitiers
- Canton: Migné-Auxances
- Intercommunality: CC Haut-Poitou

Government
  - Mayor (2020–2026): Anita Poupeau
- Area^{1}: 10.8 km^{2} (4.2 sq mi)
- Elevation: 115 m (377 ft)
- Highest elevation: 132 m (433 ft)
- Lowest elevation: 98 m (322 ft)
- Population (2023): 2,226
  - Density: 206/km^{2} (534/sq mi)
- Time zone: UTC+01:00 (CET)
  - Summer (DST): UTC+02:00 (CEST)
- INSEE/Postal code: 86016 /86170
- ^{1} French Land Register data, which excludes lakes, ponds, glaciers > 1 km^{2} (0.386 sq mi or 247 acres) and river estuaries.

Avanton (French pronunciation: [avɑ̃tɔ̃]) is a commune in the Vienne department in the Nouvelle-Aquitaine region in western France.

A Bronze Age golden hat was found near Avanton in 1844, see Avanton Gold Cone. It is on display in the National Museum of Archeology in Saint-Germain-en-Laye.

== Population ==
Historical population
Year	Pop.	±% p.a.
1968	640	—
1975	817	+3.55%
1982	1,120	+4.61%
1990	1,164	+0.48%
1999	1,414	+2.19%
2007	1,829	+3.27%
2012	1,871	+0.46%
2017	2,175	+3.06%
2023	2,226	+0.39%
Source: INSEE

== Gallery ==
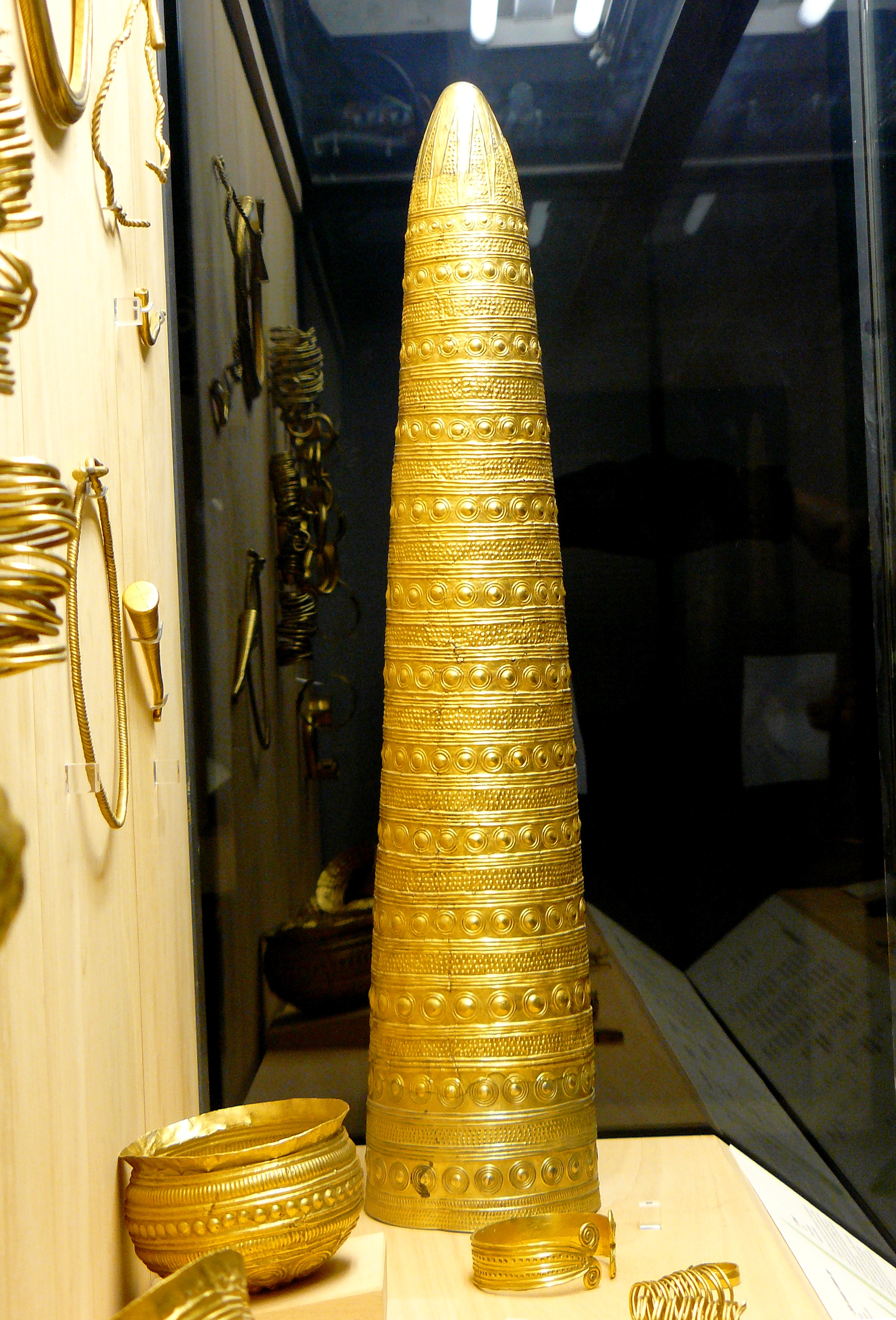
Bronze Age gold hat found in Avanton, Tumulus culture, c. 1400 BC

== See also ==
- Communes of the Vienne department
