= Berlin Gold Hat =

Late Bronze Age artefact made of thin gold leaf

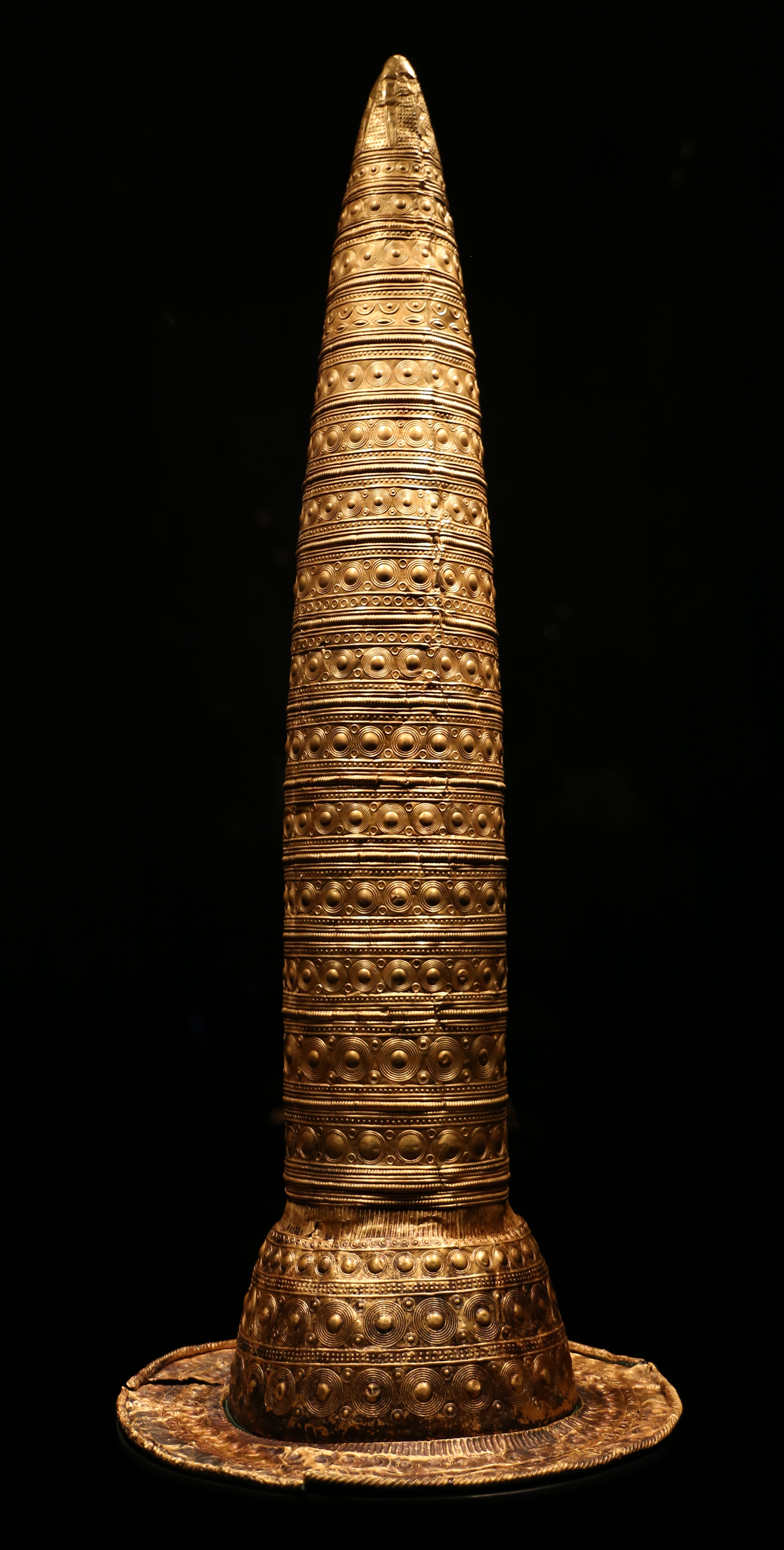
- Berlin Gold hat, Neues Museum
- Material: Gold
- Created: c. 1000-800 BC
- Discovered: before 1996; Germany or Switzerland
- Present location: Berlin, Germany

The Berlin Gold Hat or Berlin Golden Hat (German: Berliner Goldhut) is a Late Bronze Age artefact made of thin gold leaf. It served as the external covering on a long conical brimmed headdress, probably of an organic material. It is now in the Neues Museum on Museum Island in Berlin, in a room by itself with an elaborate explanatory display.

The Berlin Gold Hat is the best preserved specimen among the four known conical golden hats from Bronze Age Europe so far. Of the three others, two were found in southern Germany, and one in the west of France. All were found in the 19th and 20th centuries. It is generally assumed that the hats served as the insignia of deities or priests in the context of a sun cult that appears to have been widespread in Central Europe at the time. The hats are also suggested to have served astronomical/calendrical functions.

The Berlin Gold Hat was acquired in 1996 by the Berlin Museum für Vor- und Frühgeschichte as a single find without provenance. A comparative study of the ornaments and techniques in conjunction with dateable finds suggests that it was made in the Late Bronze Age, roughly around 1000 to 800 BC.

== Description ==
The Berlin gold hat is a 490 g (15.75 troy ounces) gold hat with a long and slender conical shaft and a differentiated convex foot, decorated all over with repousse traced motifs, applied with small stamps and wheels. Its composition is very similar to the previously known Golden Cone of Ezelsdorf-Buch.

At the bottom of the cone, the sheet gold of the Berlin hat is reinforced by a 10 mm wide ring of sheet bronze. The external edge of the brim is strengthened by a twisted square-sectioned wire, around which the gold leaf is turned upwards.

The overall height is 745 mm. The hat was hammered from a gold alloy of 89.7% Gold, 9.8% Silver, 0.4% Copper and 0.1% Tin. It was made of a single piece; its average thickness is 0.6 mm. The cone is ornamented with 21 zones of horizontal bands and rows of symbols along all of its length. Fourteen different stamps and three decorated wheels or cylindrical stamps were used. The horizontal bands were decorated systematically with repeated similar patterns.

The individual ornamental bands were optically separated traced ribs and bulges, mostly achieved with the use of cylindrical stamps. The bands of ornaments contain mostly buckle and circle motifs, most with a circular central buckle surrounded by up to six concentric circles.

One of the bands is distinctive: It is decorated with a row of recumbent crescents, each atop an almond- or eye-shaped symbol. The point of the cone is embellished with an eight-spoke star on a background of decorative punches.

An overview of the type and number of stamps used in the ornamental zones is shown on the right.

The meeting of the shaft with the foot is taken up by a wide vertically ribbed band. The foot is decorated with similar motifs to the cone itself. Near the reinforcing bronze band, it turns into a brim, also decorated with disk-shaped symbols.

== Calendar ==
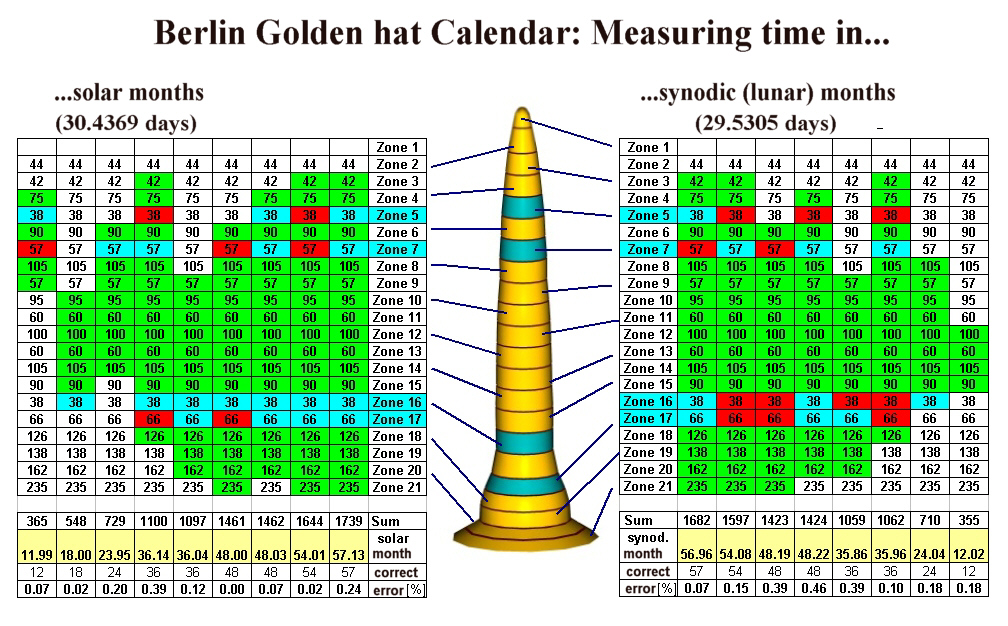
Calendrical function of the Berlin Gold Hat

Modern scholarship has demonstrated that the ornamentation of the gold leaf cones of the Schifferstadt type, to which the Berlin example belongs, represent systematic sequences in terms of number and types of ornaments per band. A detailed study of the Berlin example, which is the only one fully preserved, showed that the symbols probably represent a lunisolar calendar. The object would have permitted the determination of dates or periods in both lunar and solar calendars.

The functions discovered so far would permit the counting of temporal units of up to 57 months. A simple multiplication of such values would also permit the calculation of longer periods, such as metonic cycles. Each symbol, or each ring of a symbol, represents a single day. Apart from ornament bands incorporating differing numbers of rings there are special symbols and zones in intercalary areas, which would have had to be added to or subtracted from the periods in question.

The system of this mathematical function incorporated into the artistic ornamentation has not been fully deciphered so far, but a schematic understanding of the Berlin Golden Hat and the periods it delimits has been achieved.

In principle, starting with zone $Z_i$, a sum is achieved by adding a relevant contiguous number of neighbouring sections: $Z_i\, ...\, Z_{i+n}$. To reach the equivalent lunar or solar value, from this initial sum must be subtracted the sum of symbols from the intercalary zone(s) within the area counted.

The illustration depicts the solar representation on the left and the lunar one on the right. The red or blue fields in Zones 5, 7, 16, and 17 are intercalary zones.

The values in the individual fields are reached by multiplying the number of symbols per zone with the number of rings or circles incorporated in each predominant symbol. The special symbols in Zone 5 are assigned the value of 38, as indicated by their number.

Example
Zone 12 is dominated by 20 repetitions of punched symbol No. 14, a circular disc symbol surrounded by 5 concentric circles.
Thus, the symbol has the value of 20 × 5 = 100.
The smaller ring symbols placed between the larger repetitions of No. 14 are considered as mere ornaments and thus not counted.

Through this system, the Hats can be used to calculate a lunisolar calendrical system, i.e. a direct reading in either lunar or solar dates, as well as the conversion between them.

The table can be used in the same way as the original Golden Hats. To determine the number of days in a specific time period (yellow fields), the values of the coloured fields above are added, reaching an intermediate sum. If any of the red intercalary zones are included, their sum has to be subtracted. This allows the calculation of 12, 24, 36, 48, 54, and 57 synodic months in the lunar system and of 12, 18, 24, 36, 48, 54, and 57 solar months (twelfths of a tropical year).

Example
To determine a 54 month cycle in the lunar system, the numerical values of the green or blue Zones 3 to 21 are added, reaching a sum of 1,739 days. From this, the values of the red intercalary fields 5, 16, and 17 are subtracted, The result is 1739 − 142 = 1597 days, exactly 54 synodic months of 29.5305 days each.

The overall discrepancy of 2 days to the astronomically accurate value is probably the result of a slight imprecision in the Bronze Age observation of synodic and solar month.

== Provenance and find history ==
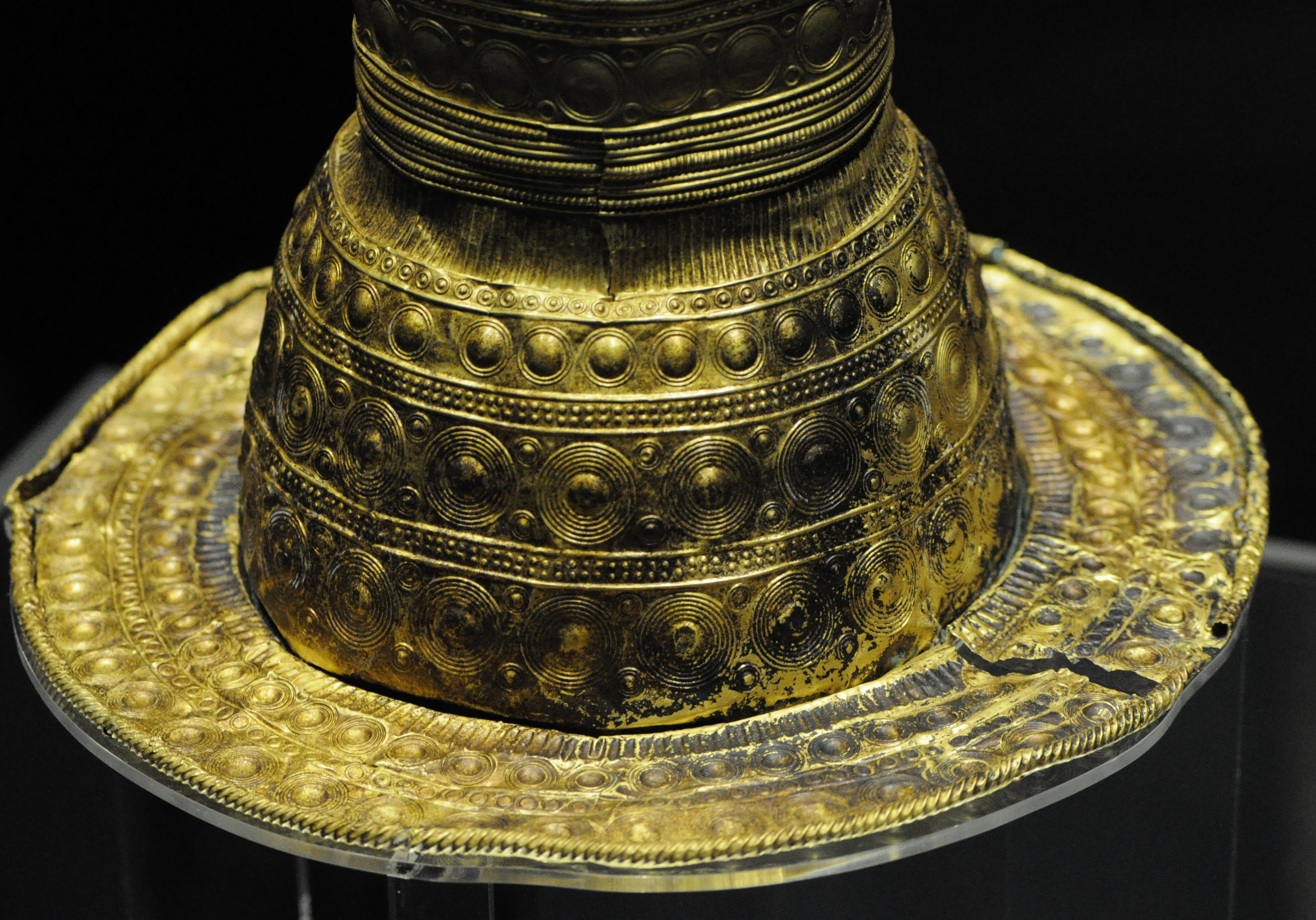
Berlin Gold Hat, Detail

The Berlin Gold Hat was put on sale in the international arts trade in 1995. In 1996, the Berlin Museum für Vor- und Frühgeschichte bought it as an important Bronze Age artefact. The seller claimed that the object came from an anonymous Swiss private collection that had been assembled in the 1950s and 1960s. It is assumed that the object was found in Southern Germany or Switzerland. No further details are known. The good preservation of the cone suggests that, like the Schifferstadt example, it must have been carefully filled with soil or ashes and then buried upright in relatively fine soil.

== Manufacture ==
The Berlin Gold Hat is made of a gold alloy of 87.7% gold, 9.8% silver, 0.4% copper and 0.1% tin. It is hammered seamlessly from a single piece with an average final wall thickness is 0.6 mm. This has led to an extremely efficient use of the hat's 490 grams of gold alloy. The 75 cm tall hat only requires enough gold to fill a cube 3.02 cm (1.19 inches) on a side (27.62 cm³, 1.685 in³).

Because of the tribological characteristics of the material, it tends to harden with increasing deformation (see ductility), increasing its potential to crack. To avoid cracking, an extremely even deformation was necessary. Additionally, the material had to be softened by repeatedly heating it to a temperature of at least 750 °C.

Since its gold alloy has a relatively low melting point of only 960°C (around 100°C less than the melting point of pure gold), very careful temperature control and an isothermal heating process were required, so as to avoid melting any of the surface. For this, the Bronze Age artisans used a charcoal fire or oven similar to those used for pottery. The temperature could only be controlled through the addition of oxygen, using a bellows.

Considering the tribologic conditions and the technical means available at the time, the production even of an undecorated Golden hat would represent an immense technical achievement.

In the course of its further manufacture, the Berlin Hat was embellished with rows of radial ornamental bands, chased into the metal. To make this possible, it was probably filled with a putty or pitch based on tree resin and wax—traces of this supportive filling have survived in the Schifferstadt specimen. The thin gold was then chased: stamp-like tools or moulds depicting the individual symbols were repeatedly pressed into (or rolled along) the exterior of the gold. At least twenty distinct tools (17 flat stamps and 3 cylindrical stamps) were used.

== See also ==
- Golden hats
- Golden Cone of Ezelsdorf-Buch, ca. 1000-800 BC
- Golden Hat of Schifferstadt, ca. 1400-1300 BC
- Avanton Gold Cone, circa 1,000-900 BC

== Bibliography ==
- Peter Schauer: Die Goldblechkegel der Bronzezeit – Ein Beitrag zur Kulturverbindung zwischen Orient und Mitteleuropa. Habelt, Bonn 1986. ISBN 3-7749-2238-1
- Gerhard Bott (ed.): Der Goldblechkegel von Ezelsdorf. (Ausstellungskatalog). Theiß, Stuttgart 1983. ISBN 3-8062-0390-3
- Mark Schmidt: Von Hüten, Kegeln und Kalendern oder Das blendende Licht des Orients. in: Ethnographisch-Archäologische Zeitschrift. Berlin 43.2002, p. 499-541. ISSN 0012-7477
- Wilfried Menghin: The Berlin Gold Hat: A Ceremonial Head-dress of the Late Bronze Age; in: Gods and Heroes of Bronze Age Europe, Strasbourg 2000, p. 172-175.
