= 1942 Tschammerpokal final =

- Match programme cover
- Event: 1942 Tschammerpokal
1860 Munich	Schalke 04
2	0
- Date: 15 November 1942
- Venue: Olympiastadion, Berlin
- Referee: Albert Multer (Landau)
- Attendance: 80,000

The 1942 Tschammerpokal final decided the winner of the 1942 Tschammerpokal, the 8th season of Germany's knockout football cup competition. It was played on 15 November 1942 at the Olympiastadion in Berlin. A total of 80,000 spectators watched the match, making it the highest attended German cup final in history. This would be the last Pokal final to take place at the stadium until 1985. 1860 Munich won the match 2–0 against Schalke 04, to claim their 1st cup title.

== Route to the final ==
The Tschammerpokal began the final stage with 64 teams in a single-elimination knockout cup competition. There were a total of five rounds leading up to the final. Teams were drawn against each other, and the winner after 90 minutes would advance. If still tied, 30 minutes of extra time was played. If the score was still level, a replay would take place at the original away team's stadium. If still level after 90 minutes, 30 minutes of extra time was played. If the score was still level, a second replay would take place at the original home team's stadium. If still level after 90 minutes, 30 minutes of extra time was played. If the score was still level, a drawing of lots would decide who would advance to the next round.

Note: In all results below, the score of the finalist is given first (H: home; A: away; N: neutral).

1860 Munich		Round	Schalke 04
Opponent	Result	1942 Tschammerpokal	Opponent	Result
Rapid Wien (H)	5–3	Round 1	Hamborn 07 (A)	2–0
Stuttgarter Kickers (A)	3–1	Round 2	Eintracht Frankfurt (N)	6–0
SS Straßburg (H)	15–1	Round of 16	Westende Hamborn (H)	4–1
Stade Dudelange (A)	7–0	Quarter-finals	SV Dessau 05 (A)	4–0
TuS Lipine (H)	6–0	Semi-finals	Werder Bremen (H)	2–0

== Match ==
=== Details ===
15 November 1942
14:00 CET

1860 Munich	2–0	Schalke 04
Wilimowski 80'; Schmidhuber 88'	Report

Olympiastadion, Berlin
Attendance: 80,000
Referee: Albert Multer (Landau)

1860 Munich	Schalke 04

GK	1	(Germany) Hans Keis
RB		(Germany) Georg Pledl (c)
LB		(Germany) Franz Schmeiser
RH		(Germany) Josef Rockinger
CH		(Germany) Georg Bayerer
LH		(Germany) Rolf Kanitz
OR		(Germany) Martin Schiller
IR		(Germany) Ludwig Janda
CF		(Germany) Heinz Krückeberg
IL		(Germany) Ernst Wilimowski
OL		(Germany) Engelbert Schmidhuber
Manager:
(Germany) Max Schäfer

GK	1	(Germany) Heinz Flotho
RB		(Germany) Heinz Hinz
LB		(Germany) Otto Schweisfurth
RH		(Germany) Hans Bornemann
CH		(Germany) Otto Tibulski
LH		(Germany) Walter Berg
OR		(Germany) Ernst Kalwitzki
IR		(Germany) Fritz Szepan
CF		(Germany) Hermann Eppenhoff
IL		(Germany) Ernst Kuzorra (c)
OL		(Germany) Adolf Urban
Manager:
(Germany) Otto Faist

Match rules

- 90 minutes.
- 30 minutes of extra time if necessary.
- Replay if scores still level.
- No substitutions.
