= Schifferstadt =

- Town
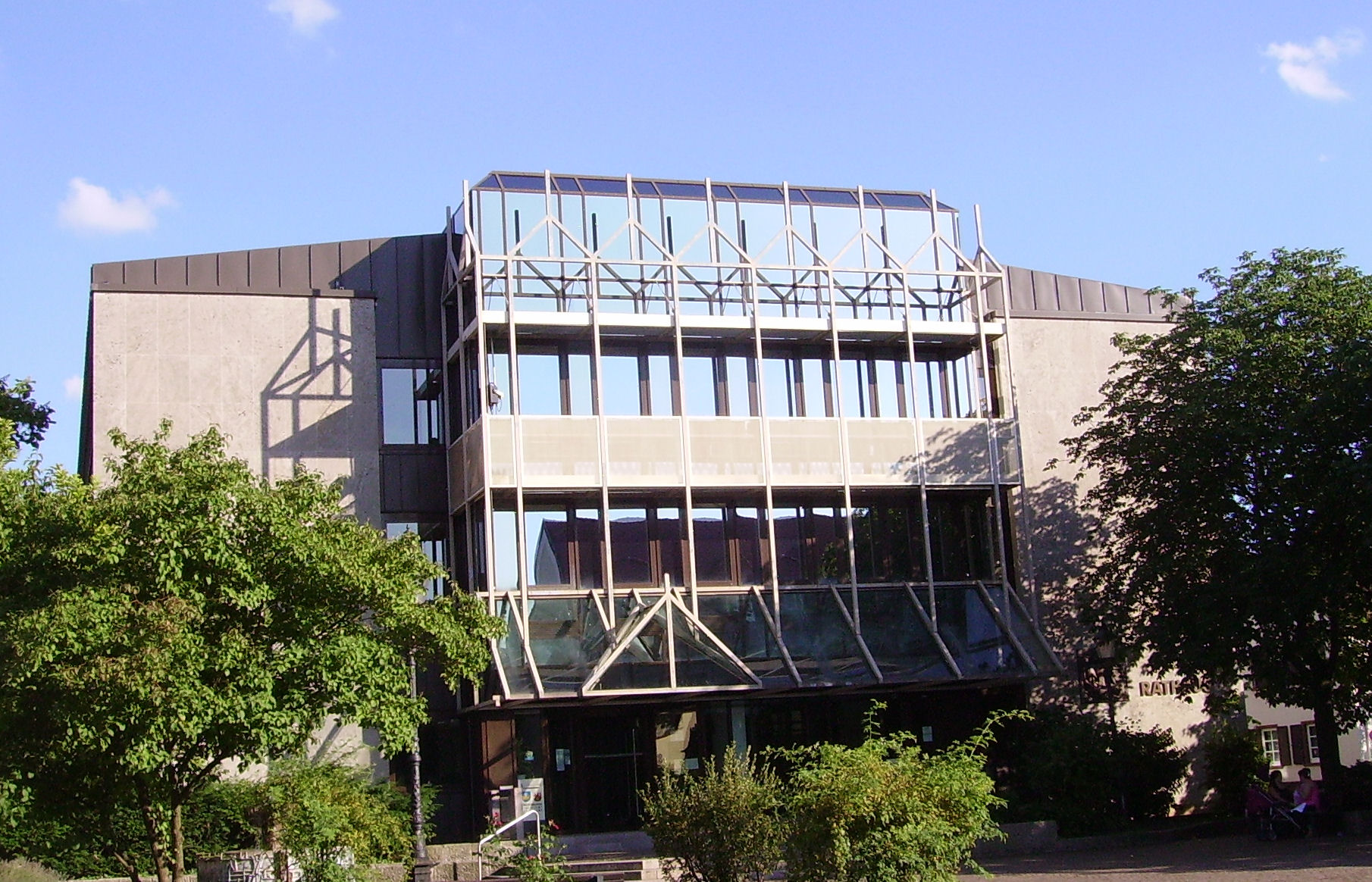
- New town hall

- Coat of arms

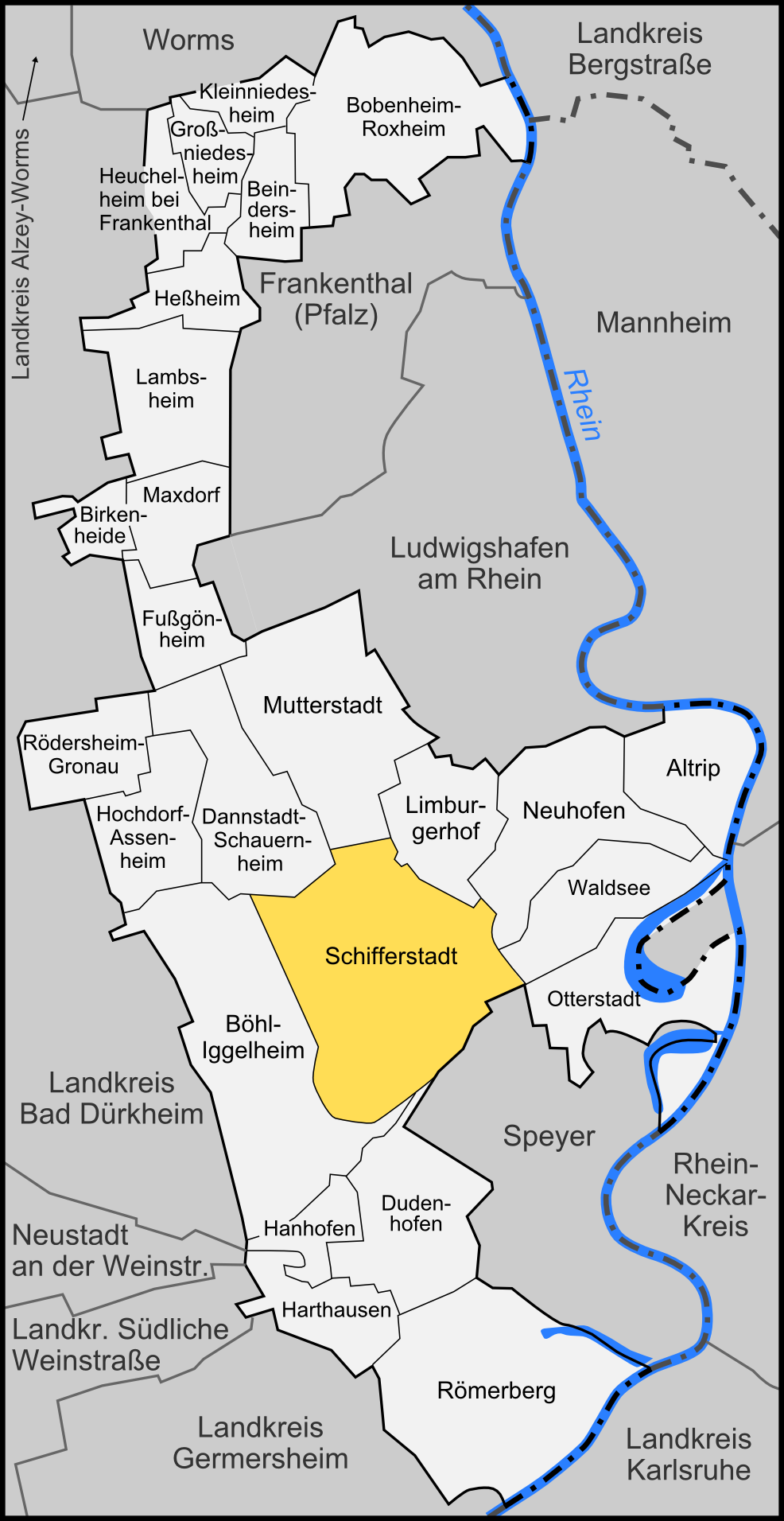
- Location of Schifferstadt within Rhein-Pfalz-Kreis district
- Interactive map of Schifferstadt
- Location within Germany Location within Rhineland-Palatinate
- Coordinates: 49°23′N 8°22′E
- Country: Germany
- State: Rhineland-Palatinate
- District: Rhein-Pfalz-Kreis

Government
  - Mayor (2019–27): Ilona Volk (Greens)

Area
  - Total: 28.06 km^{2} (10.83 sq mi)
- Elevation: 104 m (341 ft)

Population (2025-12-31)
  - Total: 21,392
  - Density: 762.4/km^{2} (1,975/sq mi)
- Time zone: UTC+01:00 (CET)
  - Summer (DST): UTC+02:00 (CEST)
- Postal codes: 67105
- Dialling codes: 06235
- Vehicle registration: RP
- Website: www.schifferstadt.de

Schifferstadt (German pronunciation: [ˈʃɪfɐʃtat]; Palatine German: Schiwwerschdadd, Schiffaschdad, or Schiwwerschdadt) is a town in the Rhein-Pfalz-Kreis, in Rhineland-Palatinate, Germany. If not including Ludwigshafen (the district free city that is the capital of Rhein-Pfalz-Kreis), Schifferstadt is the only urban municipality in the Rhein-Pfalz-Kreis.

It is situated approximately 12 km southwest of Ludwigshafen and 6 km northwest of Speyer.

== History ==
In 1835 the Golden Hat of Schifferstadt was found nearby, the oldest of four known hats of that kind, dated to 1400-1300 BC.

== Mayors ==
- 1945–1946: Arnulf Kaufmann
- 1946–1949: Valentin Stahl (CDU)
- 1949–1971: Adam Teutsch (CDU)
- 1971–1975: Theo Magin (CDU), born 1932
- 1975–1995: Josef Sold (CDU)
- 1995–2003: Edwin Mayer (CDU)
- 2003–2011: Klaus Sattel (FWG)
- since 2011: Ilona Volk (The Greens), born 1963, first green mayor in Rhineland-Palatinate

== Population development ==
| Year | Inhabitants |
|---|---|
| 1815 | 1.836 |
| 1835 | 2.994 |
| 1871 | 3.995 |
| 1905 | 7.505 |
| 1939 | 11.315 |
| 1950 | 13.242 |
| 1961 | 15.636 |

| Year | Inhabitants |
|---|---|
| 1970 | 17.148 |
| 1987 | 17.322 |
| 1997 | 18.955 |
| 2005 | 19.242 |
| 2016 | 19.983 |
| 2023 | 20.682 |

== Coat of arms ==
The blazon of the coat of arms of Schifferstadt is: „In Blau ein stilisiertes goldenes Schiff mit vorne angelehntem, aufrechtem goldenem Ruder, daraus wachsend ein silbernes Kreuz.“ “In blue a stylized golden ship, with an upright golden oar, and a silver cross”

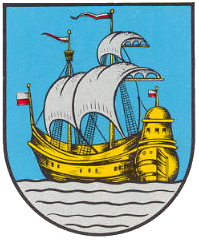
The greater version of the coat of arms

The lesser version of the coat of arms

== Town twinning ==
- Aichach (Germany)
- (United States) Frederick (US)
- Löbejün (Germany)

== Personalities ==
=== Honorary citizen ===
- 1969: Wilfried Dietrich (1933-1992), Olympic champion in wrestling, called the Crane of Schifferstadt "

=== Sons and daughters of the city ===
- Franz Funk (1905-1987), musician, composer, arranger and composer
- Heinz Hoffmann (1923-1999), physician, pedagogue and engineer
- Philip Jalalpoor (born 1993), basketball player
- Stefan Jambo (born 1958), footballer
- Bernd Gerber (born 1961), footballer

=== People who have worked in the city ===
- Hieronymus Bock (1498-1554), botanist and theologian, lived on a temporary basis
- Albert Ferber (1923-2010), German semi-heavyweight champion (Wrestling)
- Hans-Jürgen Veil (born 1946), Olympic silver medal winner 1972 in the wrestling (VfK Schifferstadt)
- Markus Scherer (born 1962 in Ludwigshafen), Olympic silver medal winner 1984 in the wrestling (VfK Schifferstadt)
- Claudio Passarelli (born 1965 in Ludwigshafen), wrestler and world champion of 1989

== See also ==
- Schifferstadt, a house in the U.S. state of Maryland
