= Golden Cone of Ezelsdorf-Buch =

Bronze Age gold artefact

Coordinates: 49.325°N 11.365°E

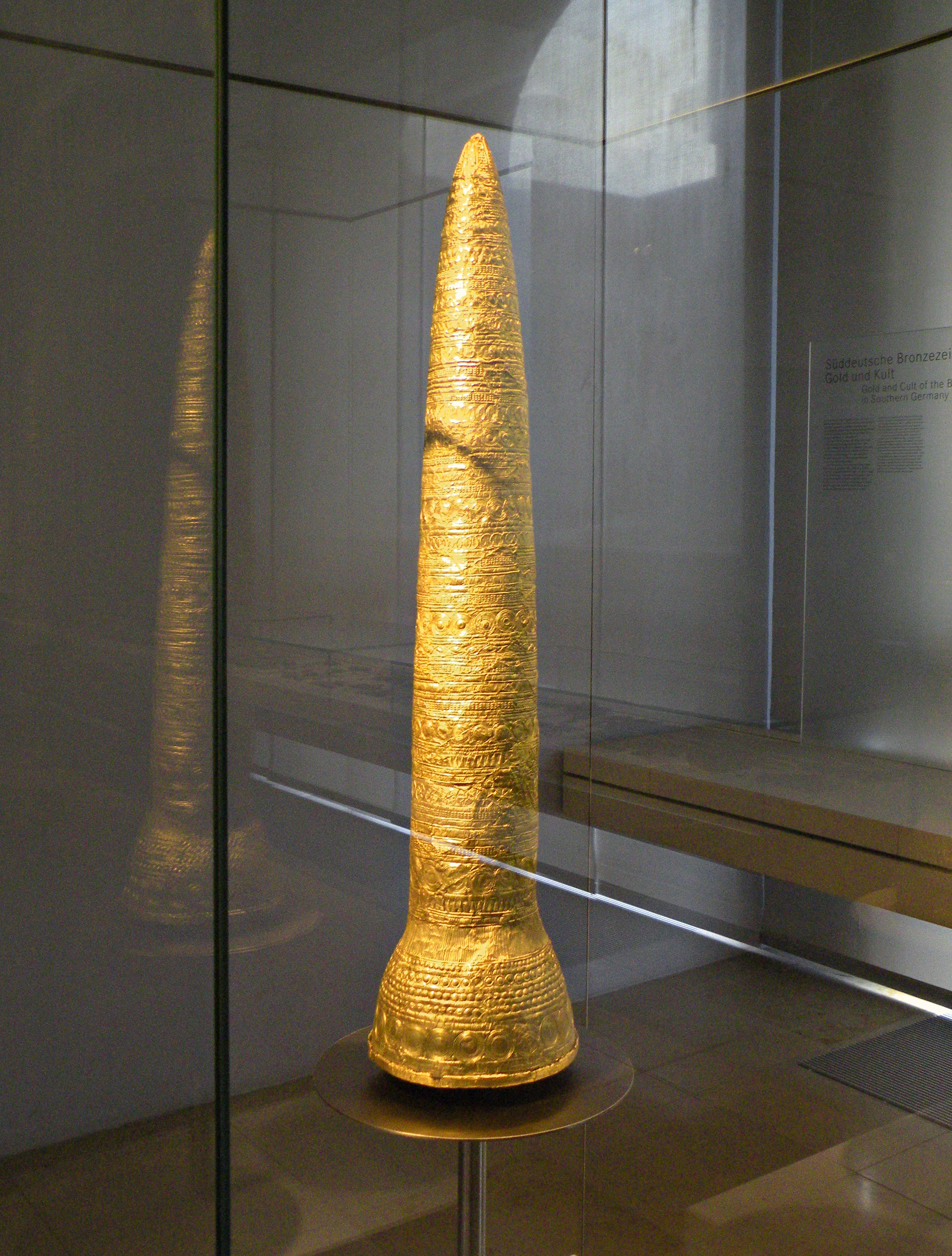
- Material: Gold
- Height: c. 72 cm (original); 88.3 cm
- Created: c. 1000-900 BC
- Discovered: 1953; Postbauer-Heng, Bavaria, Germany
- Present location: Nuremberg, Bavaria, Germany

The Golden Cone of Ezelsdorf-Buch (German: Goldblechkegel von Ezelsdorf-Buch) is a Late Bronze Age artefact discovered in 1953 between the villages of Ezelsdorf (Middle Franconia) and Buch (Upper Palatinate) in Southern Germany. A tall (88 cm, 37 inches), cone-shaped object made of thin sheet gold, it is seen as belonging to a group of artifacts referred to as Bronze Age Golden hats. It was presumably worn by special functionaries on ceremonial occasions.

== Cultural Context and date ==
The Ezelsdorf-Buch cone is one of four such known items. Two of them were discovered in Southern Germany, one in the west of France, and one is without provenance, believed to have been found in Switzerland or Germany. It dates to circa 1,000 to 900 BC.

Parallels have been drawn between the golden 'hats' and depictions found on the Kivik slabs and on objects from the Stockhult hoard discovered in Scandinavia.

The 'hat', like its counterparts, is assumed to have served as a religious insignia for the deities or priests of a sun-cult common in Bronze Age Europe. The hats are also suggested to have served calendrical functions.

== Provenance and find history ==
The Ezelsdorf-Buch Cone was discovered accidentally during the removal of tree-stumps in 1953. However, it was not recognised as an archaeological find immediately, and its top was torn and broken by digging tools, probably weakening or destroying the structure of the whole object. It is also possible that the object had been damaged previously or that it had fully or partially collapsed during burial. It was probably originally buried in an upright position, with its top relatively near ground level, as were its Berlin and Schifferstadt counterparts. After recovery, the cone was mutilated and torn into small scraps of sheet gold. Although it could be mostly reconstructed at an early stage, it was only in the 1990s that the find was understood as belonging to the group of "golden hats".

== Description ==
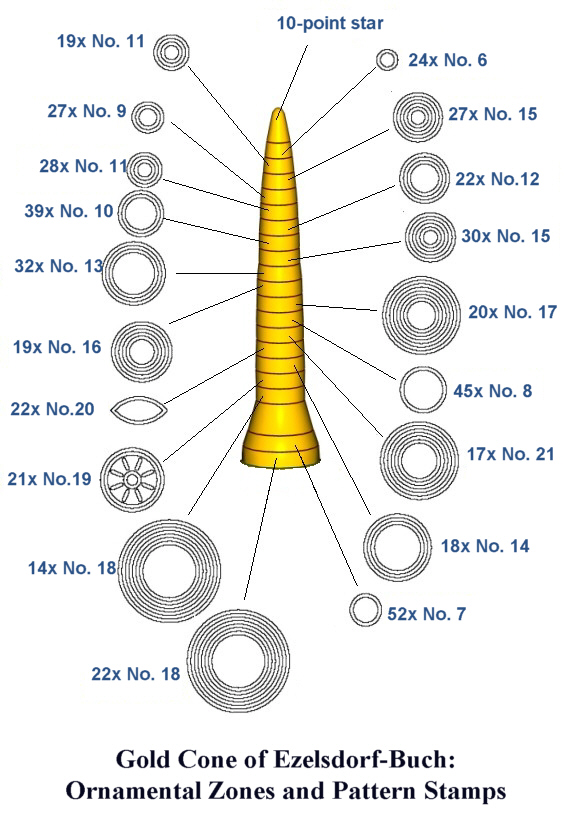
Schematic depiction of the Ezelsdorf Cone's decorative scheme

Including the part now missing, the 'hat' would have weighed about 330 g. Like its counterparts, it was hammered from a single piece of gold, decorated in the repoussé technique with bands and rows of symbols, had a somewhat convex, cap-like, lower portion and was originally equipped with a 'brim', which was probably lost during its recovery. Like the Berlin example, it was reinforced by one or several bronze rings near the bottom.

The cone is now (in reconstructed form) 88.3 cm high, but was probably somewhat shorter, at 72 cm or more.

Along its whole length, the object's surface is subdivided and decorated by horizontal bands or ribs and by rows of symbols. In total, there are 154 bands and symbol rows. The symbols are mostly circular bosses enclosed by up to seven concentric circles, as known from all other specimens. There are three sets of unusual special motifs: small horizontal ovals resembling eyes (row 92, also known from Schifferstadt and Berlin), small eight-spoked wheels (row 120) and miniature cones (rows 127 and 105). The latter are unique to the Ezesldorf-Buch cone and appear to represent the shape of a gold 'hat'. The tip of the cone is embellished with a ten-point star. The area where the cone joins the cap-like area is embellished with a 30 mm wide band of vertical grooving, as is the case on the Berlin example.

== Manufacture ==
The piece is hammered from a gold alloy; gold (88.3%), silver (11%), copper (0.59%) and tin (0.086%). Its average thickness is only 0.78 mm. The amount of gold used for making the object is equivalent to the size of a matchbox.

Twenty different decorative punches, a comb, and six stamp-wheels or cylindrical stamps were used to apply the patterns. For a more detailed discussion of the cone's manufacture, see here.

== Present location ==
The Golden Cone of Ezelsdorf-Buch is on display in the Germanisches Nationalmuseum, Nuremberg.

== See also ==
- Golden hats
- Berlin Gold Hat, circa 1,000-800 BC
- Golden Hat of Schifferstadt, circa 1,400 to 1,300 BC
- Avanton Gold Cone, circa 1500-1200 BC
- Nebra sky disk, circa 2,100 to 1,700 BC

== Bibliography ==
1. Gold und Kult der Bronzezeit. (Ausstellungskatalog). Germanisches Nationalmuseum, Nürnberg 2003. ISBN 3-926982-95-0
2. Wilfried Menghin (ed.): Acta Praehistorica et Archaeologica. Unze, Potsdam 32.2000, S. 31-108. ISSN 0341-1184
3. Peter Schauer: Die Goldblechkegel der Bronzezeit – Ein Beitrag zur Kulturverbindung zwischen Orient und Mitteleuropa. Habelt, Bonn 1986. ISBN 3-7749-2238-1
4. Gerhard Bott (Hrsg.): Der Goldblechkegel von Ezelsdorf. (Ausstellungskatalog). Theiß, Stuttgart 1983. ISBN 3-8062-0390-3
5. Mark Schmidt: Von Hüten, Kegeln und Kalendern oder Das blendende Licht des Orients. in: Ethnographisch-Archäologische Zeitschrift. Berlin 43.2002, p. 499-541. ISSN 0012-7477
6. Ernst Probst: Deutschland in der Bronzezeit. Bauern, Bronzegießer und Burgherren zwischen Nordsee und Alpen. München 1999. ISBN 3-572-01059-4
7. Tobias Springer: The Golden Cone of Ezelsdorf-Buch: A Masterpiece of the Goldsmith's Art from the Bronze Age, in: Gods and Heroes of Bronze Age Europe, Strasbourg 2000; p. 176-181.

== Gallery ==
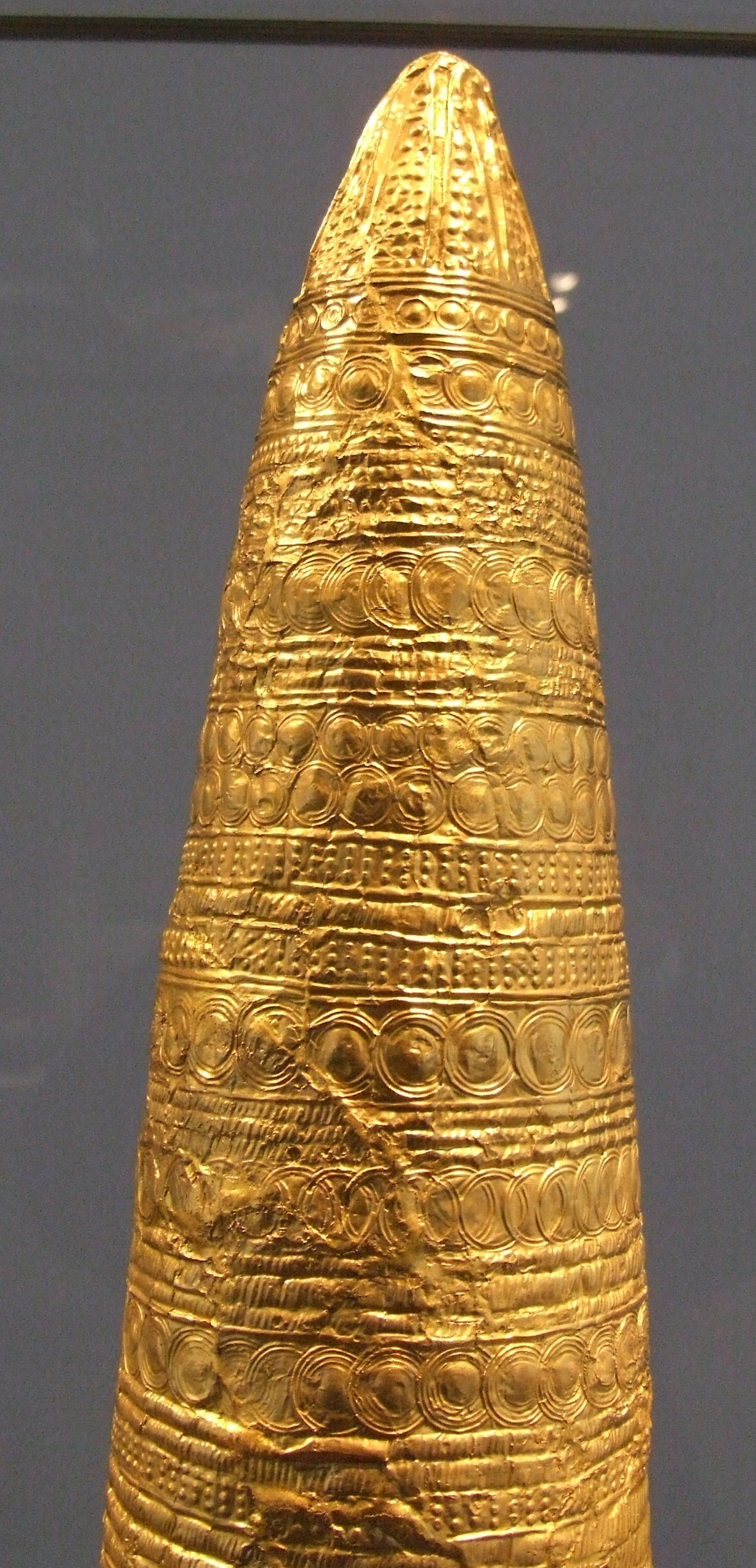
Top of Golden Cone of Ezelsdorf-Buch

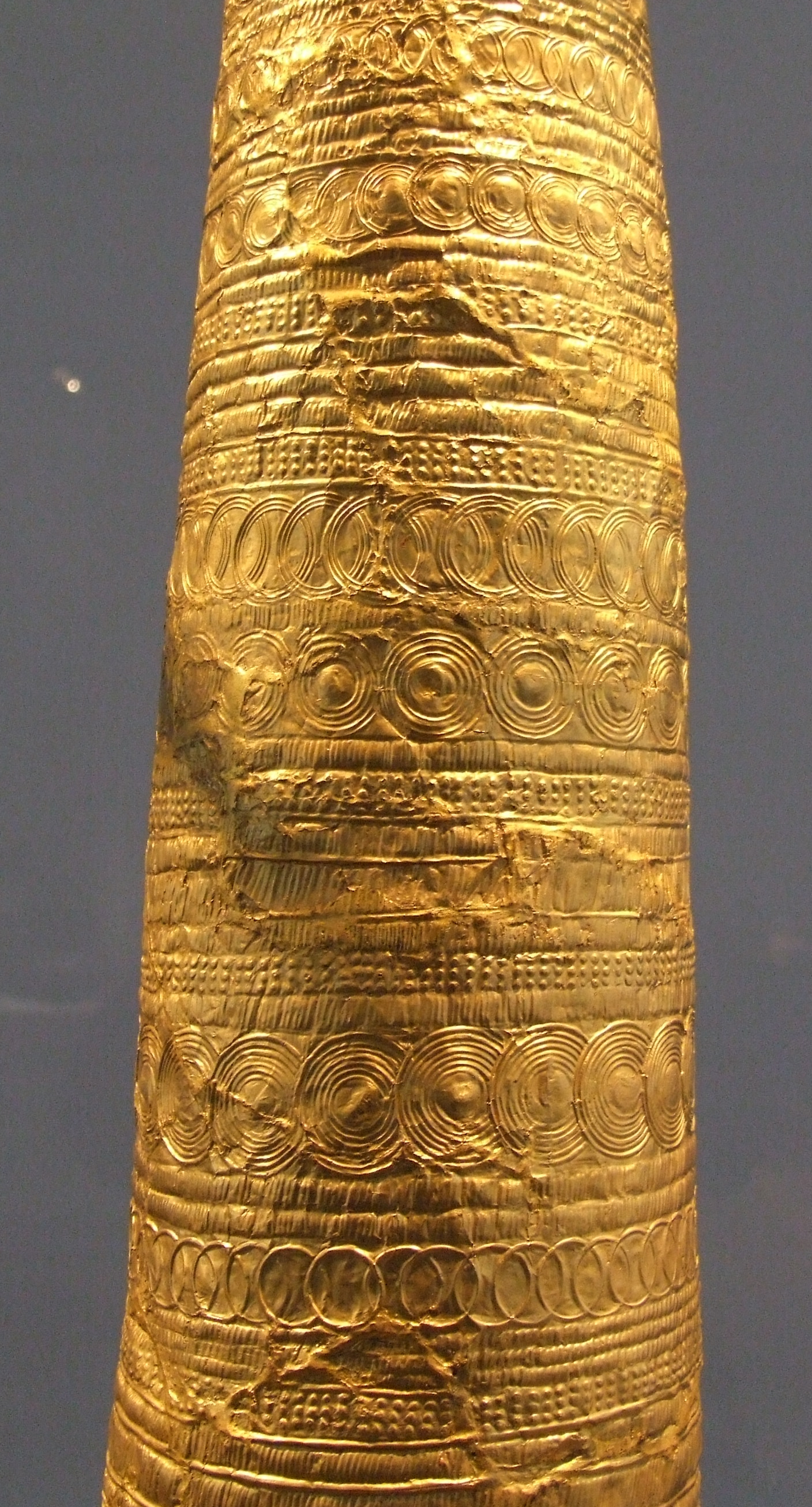
upper part of the shank

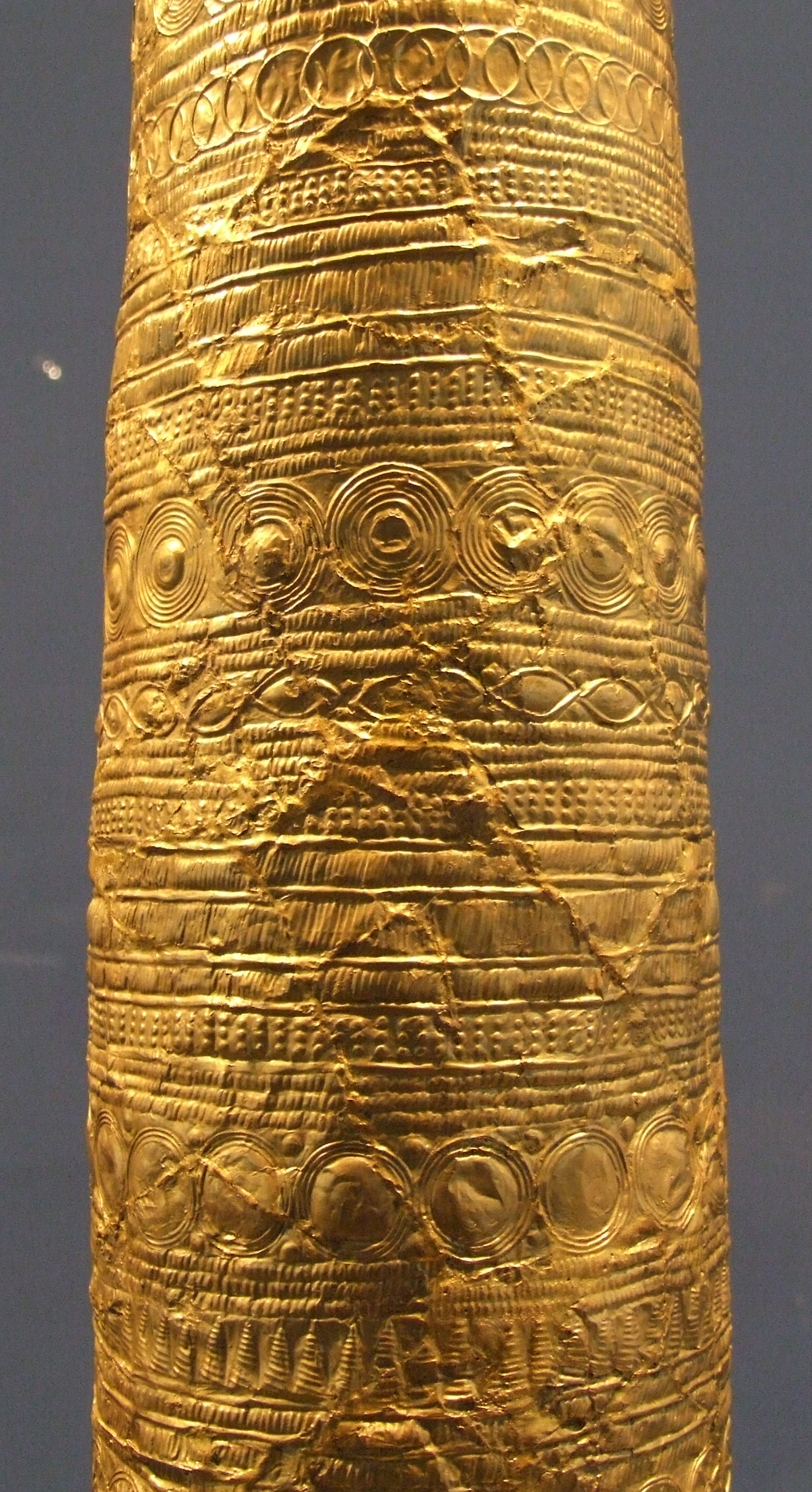
lower part of the shank

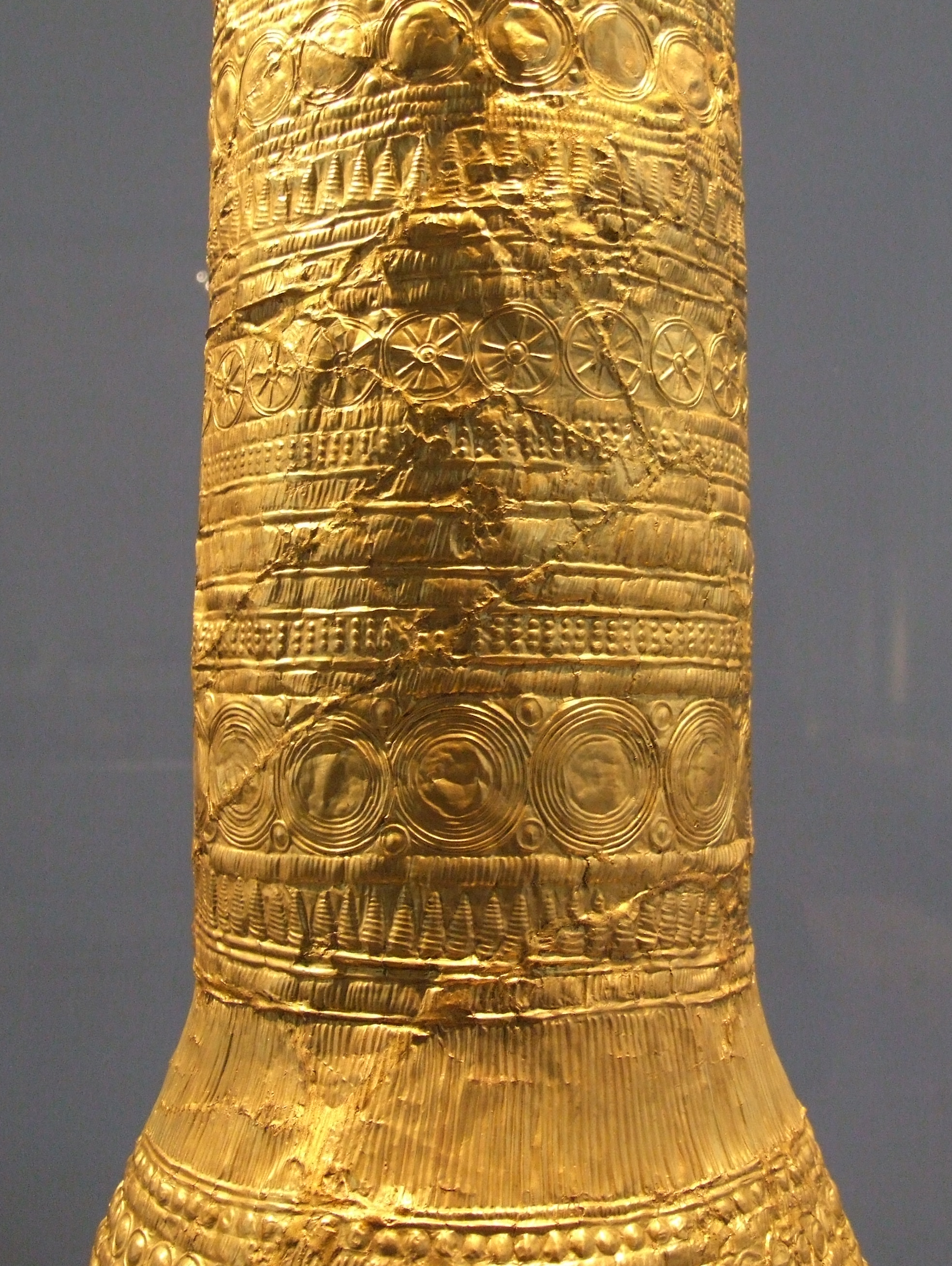
Transition from the shank to the base

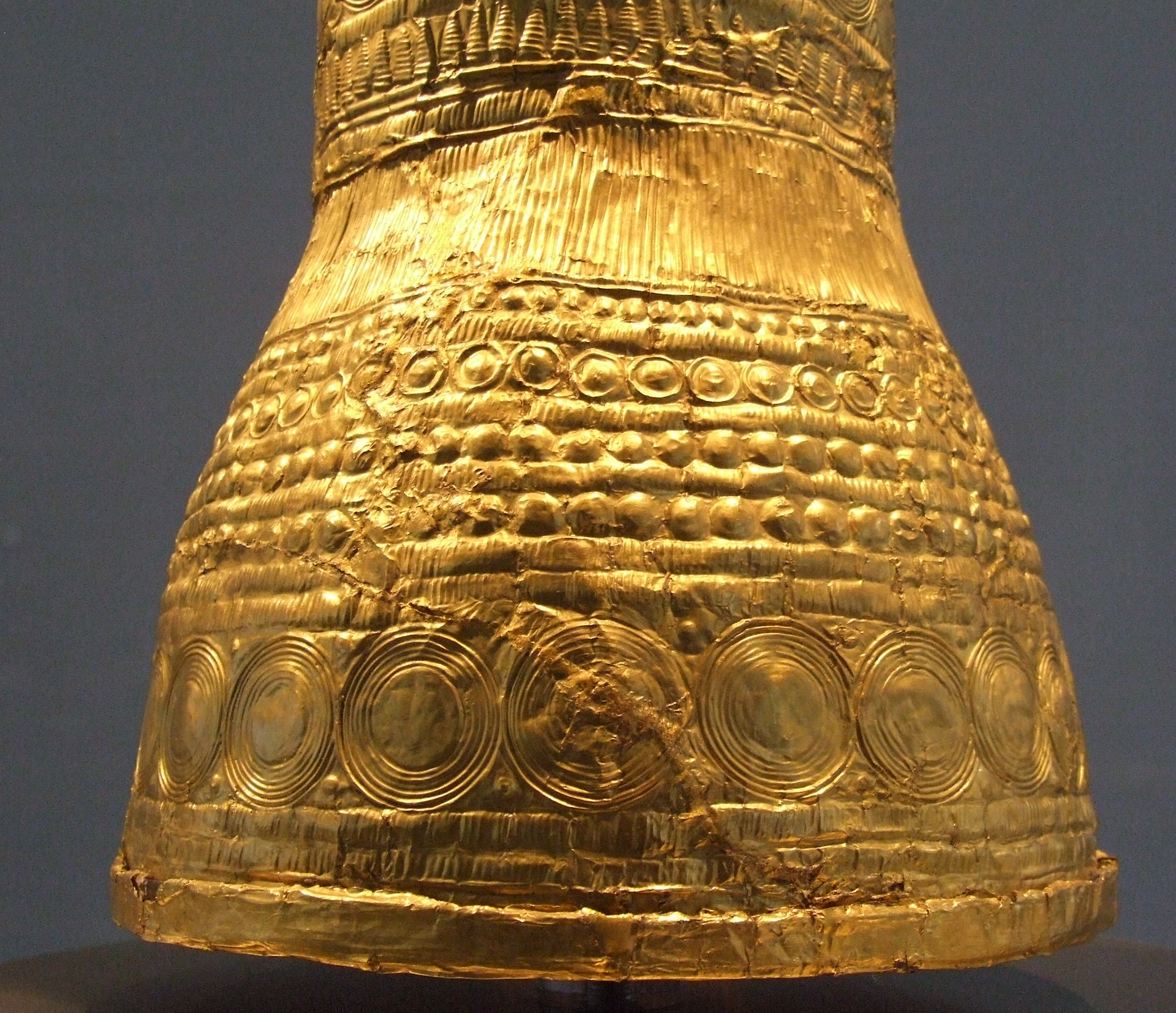
base

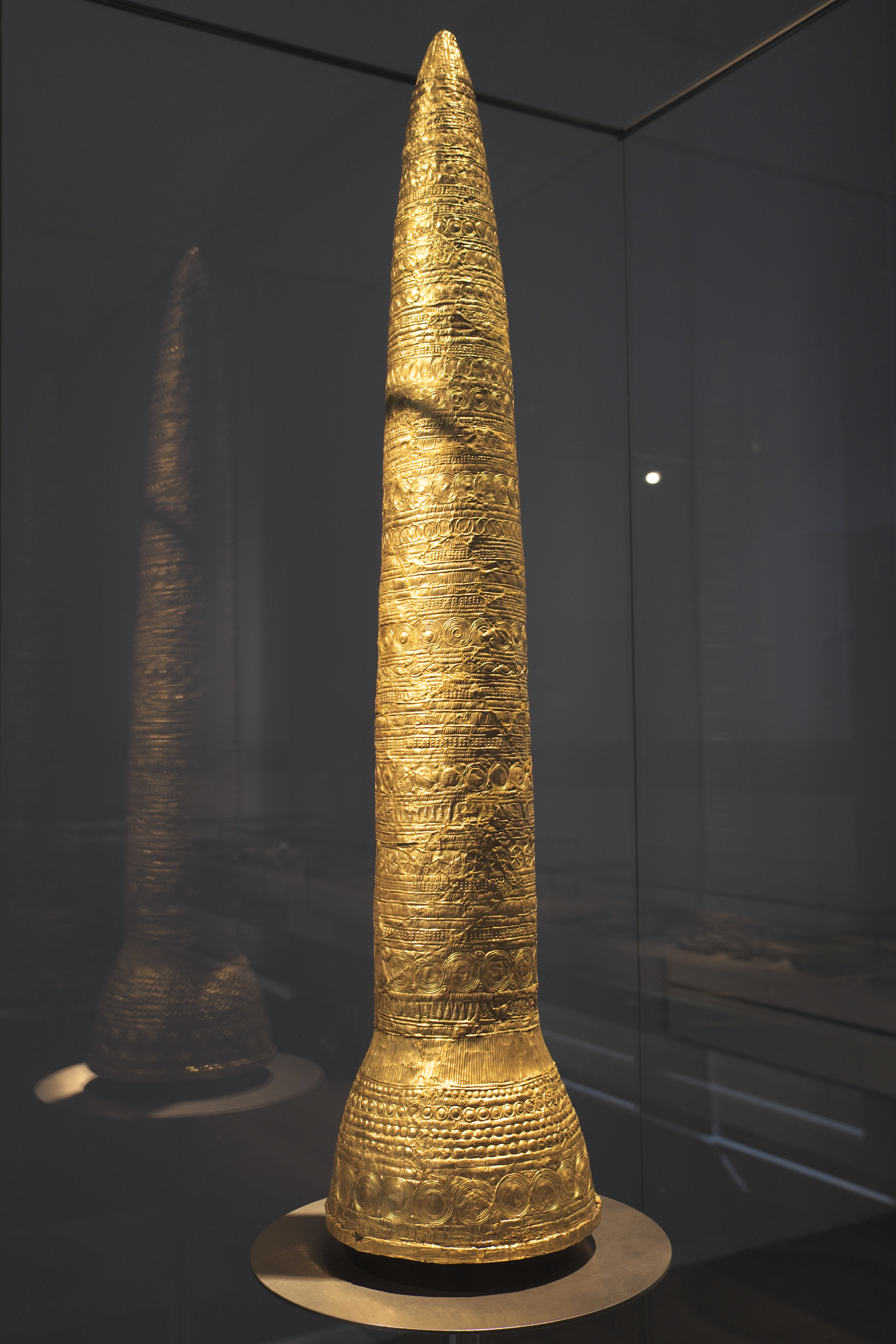
