= Wayne Thomas =

Wayne Thomas may refer to:

- Wayne Thomas (ice hockey) (1947–2025), Canadian ice hockey player
- Wayne B. Thomas (born 1969), American economist
- Wayne Thomas (bobsleigh) (born 1966), Jamaican Olympic bobsledder
- Wayne Thomas (footballer, born 1978), English footballer
- Wayne Thomas (footballer, born 1979), English footballer
- Wayne Thomas (Welsh footballer) (born 1958), Welsh former professional footballer
- Wayne Thomas (musician), member of the Welsh alternative rock band Trampolene
- Wayne Thomas (wrestler) (born 1959), Olympic wrestler
- Wayne Thomas Satz (1945–1992), American reporter

== See also ==
- Thomas Wayne, DC comics character
