= Wayne Thomas (Welsh footballer) =

English-born Welsh footballer

Personal information
- Date of birth: 2 September 1958 (age 68)
- Place of birth: Coventry, England
- Height: 1.75 m (5 ft 9 in)
- Position: Midfielder

Senior career*
Years	Team	Apps	(Gls)
1978–1980	KSV Baunatal	30	(2)
1980–1983	Alemannia Aachen	113	(24)
1983–1985	Bayer Uerdingen	39	(0)
1985–1987	Hannover 96	55	(10)
1987–1989	Kickers Offenbach	47	(3)
1989–1991	KSV Baunatal		
1991–1994	Borussia Fulda		
Total		284	(39)
- * Club domestic league appearances and goals

Wayne Thomas (born 2 September 1958) is a Welsh former professional footballer who spent the majority of his career playing in Germany.

== Career ==
Thomas was active in German professional football since 1978. After appearances in the 2. Bundesliga at KSV Baunatal and at Alemannia Aachen, he moved in the 1983–84 Bundesliga season to newly promoted side Bayer 05 Uerdingen, where he became a regular player. His biggest success with the Krefeldern was winning the DFB-Pokal in 1985. In the 2–1 final victory against the Bayern Munich, Thomas came on as a substitute.

In 1985, he joined the Bundesliga promoted Hannover 96, with which he descended directly and then immediately rose again. In the 1986–87 Bundesliga season, he completed only three appearances, before he switched back to the second division to Kickers Offenbach.

Wayne Thomas's younger brother Dean Thomas was active as a pro in Germany. He came to first and second division appearances for Alemannia Aachen and Fortuna Dusseldorf.

== Honours ==
Bayer Uerdingen

- DFB-Pokal: 1984–85
