= Volker Abramczik =

German footballer

Personal information
- Date of birth: 27 May 1964 (age 62)
- Place of birth: Gelsenkirchen, West Germany
- Height: 1.76 m (5 ft 9 in)
- Position: Striker

Youth career
- 1968–1981: Schalke 04

Senior career*
Years	Team	Apps	(Gls)
1981–1984	Schalke 04	55	(13)
1984–1985	MSV Duisburg	37	(13)
1986–1990	Rot-Weiss Essen	98	(20)

Managerial career
- 1995–1996: SC Hassel
- 1996–: STV Horst-Emscher
- SV Erle 08
- * Club domestic league appearances and goals

Volker Abramczik (born 27 May 1964 in Gelsenkirchen) is a former German football player. The younger brother of German international Rüdiger Abramczik, he played during his career exclusively for sides based in the Ruhr Area.

Starting at the age of four, Volker Abramczik played for the youth sides of FC Schalke 04. In the 1981–82 season, he made his professional debut for Schalke 04, which was at that time was playing in the 2. Bundesliga. The then 17-year-old played a big part in Schalke's promotion to the Bundesliga with 24 caps and six goals. In the following season, Abramczik only played three times and Schalke was relegated to the 2. Bundesliga. One year later, Schalke won the promotion to Bundesliga again, but Abramczik left the club for the 2. Bundesliga side MSV Duisburg. After one year, he transferred to Rot-Weiss Essen where he ended his career in 1990.
