= Norbert Brinkmann =

German footballer

Personal information
- Date of birth: 16 June 1952 (age 74)
- Place of birth: Oberhausen, West Germany
- Height: 1.79 m (5 ft 10 1/2 in)
- Position: Centre-back

Senior career*
Years	Team	Apps	(Gls)
1970–1972	Sterkrade 06/07		
1972–1987	Bayer Uerdingen	364	(10)
Total		364	(10)
- * Club domestic league appearances and goals

Norbert Brinkmann (born 16 June 1952) is a German former footballer who played as a centre-back. He played in the Bundesliga and 2. Bundesliga with Bayer Uerdingen and won the DFB-Pokal in 1985.
