= Stefan Jambo =

German footballer

Personal information
- Full name: Stefan Franz Jambo
- Date of birth: 2 August 1958 (age 68)
- Place of birth: Schifferstadt, West Germany

Senior career*
Years	Team	Apps	(Gls)
1979–1981	FC Homburg		
1981–1986	1. FC Saarbrücken		
1986	1. FC Nürnberg		
1986–1988	FC Homburg		
1988–1989	Mainz 05		
1990	Strømsgodset IF		
1990	Mjøndalen IF		
1991–1992	SV Blau Weiss Berlin		

Managerial career
- 1993–1994: Vollen UL
- * Club domestic league appearances and goals

Stefan Franz Jambo (born 2 August 1958) is a German former professional footballer who played as a midfielder in the Bundesliga and the Norwegian Premier League.

Jambo mainly played in FC 08 Homburg and 1. FC Saarbrücken. In his second Homburg spell the team contested the Bundesliga. Ahead of the 1990 season he went to Norway and Strømsgodset IF. His career there was short-lived, as he also played for neighbors Mjøndalen IF.

The next year he finished his career in SV Blau Weiss Berlin. He later moved back to Norway, working as a floorlayer. He also coached Vollen UL for one and a half season.
