= Karl-Heinz Emig =

German football player and manager

Personal information
- Date of birth: 29 June 1962 (age 64)
- Place of birth: Mannheim, West Germany
- Height: 1.85 m (6 ft 1 in)
- Positions: Midfielder; defender

Senior career*
Years	Team	Apps	(Gls)
1979–1982	SV Waldhof Mannheim	32	(2)
1982–1984	Hertha BSC	39	(0)
1984–1988	SV Darmstadt 98	147	(13)
1988–1990	1. FC Kaiserslautern	55	(1)
1992–1993	SpVgg Unterhaching	45	(0)
1993–1995	VfL Wolfsburg	37	(2)

Managerial career
- 1996–1998: SV Eintracht Trier 05
- 1998–2004: 1. FC Kaiserslautern (assistant)
- 2002: 1. FC Kaiserslautern (caretaker)
- 2004–2006: SV Wacker Burghausen (assistant)
- 2008–2009: 1. FC Kaiserslautern (Under-17)
- 2010: Karlsruher SC (assistant)
- 2011–2012: Rot-Weiß Oberhausen (assistant)
- * Club domestic league appearances and goals

Karl-Heinz Emig (born 29 June 1962 in Mannheim) is a German football coach and a former player.

== Career ==
Emig spent three seasons in the Bundesliga with Hertha BSC and 1. FC Kaiserslautern.

== Coaching career ==
In the 2002–03 season, he was a caretaker manager of 1. FC Kaiserslautern for eight days. Emig managed the under-17 youth team of 1. FC Kaiserslautern until 7 January 2010 and one day later, he announced he would begin to work in the future as assistant coach for Karlsruher SC.
