= Matthias Herget =

German footballer

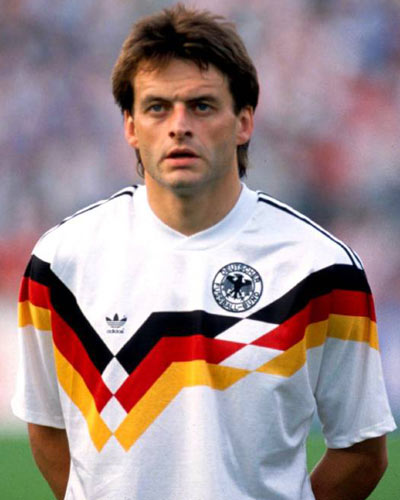
- Herget with West Germany

Personal information
- Date of birth: 14 November 1955 (age 70)
- Place of birth: Annaberg-Buchholz, East Germany
- Height: 1.78 m (5 ft 10 in)
- Position: Sweeper

Youth career
- 1965–1973: Rot-Weiß Bismarck Gelsenkirchen
- 1973–1976: SC Gelsenkirchen 07

Senior career*
Years	Team	Apps	(Gls)
1976–1978	VfL Bochum	64	(2)
1978–1982	Rot-Weiss Essen	142	(38)
1982–1989	Bayer Uerdingen	208	(29)
1989–1990	Schalke 04	19	(0)
Total		433	(69)

International career
1976–1978	West Germany Amateur	13	(2)
1983	West Germany U21	3	(3)
1983–1988	West Germany	39	(4)

Managerial career
- 1997–1998: 1. FC Bocholt
- * Club domestic league appearances and goals

Matthias Herget (born 14 November 1955) is a German former professional footballer who played as a sweeper.

He amassed Bundesliga totals of 237 games and 26 goals over the course of eight seasons, mainly in representation of Bayer Uerdingen, of which he was also a longtime captain.

Herget gained 39 caps for West Germany, representing the nation in one World Cup and one European Championship.

== Club career ==
Born in Annaberg-Buchholz, East Germany, Herget started playing professionally with VfL Bochum, appearing in two Bundesliga seasons. In the 1978 summer, he moved to the second division and joined Rot-Weiss Essen, appearing almost exclusively as a midfielder during his spell, and scoring 36 league goals in his last three seasons combined.

Herget continued in the second level in the 1982–83 season, netting five goals in 35 games for Bayer 05 Uerdingen as the team promoted to the top flight after finishing third. He continued to be an undisputed starter in the following years, also managing to score in every season during his seven-year stint, which included a best-ever third position for the club in 1985–86; additionally, he played the full 90 minutes in the final of the 1985 German Cup, winning the first and only trophy of his career after defeating FC Bayern Munich 2–1.

After having helped the Krefeld outfit once again retain its division status in 1988–89, 33-year-old Herget signed with FC Schalke 04, retiring at the end of the season. After becoming a manager, he was in charge of several lowly clubs, including SSV Buer, Eisbachtaler Sportfreunde 1919 e. V. and 1. FC Bocholt.

== International career ==
Herget made his debut for West Germany on 26 October 1983, replacing Hans-Peter Briegel for the last ten minutes of a 5–1 home win against Turkey for the UEFA Euro 1984 qualifiers. He was part of the squad that finished second at the 1986 FIFA World Cup in Mexico, but only appeared once, in the 2–0 group stage loss against Denmark at Estadio Corregidora in Querétaro.

Still under manager Franz Beckenbauer, Herget became first-choice, also being selected for Euro 1988, which was played on home soil. He paired 1. FC Köln's Jürgen Kohler during the tournament as the national team reached the semifinals, and eventually gained a total of 39 caps.

== Career statistics ==
Scores and results list West Germany's goal tally first, score column indicates score after each Herget goal.

List of international goals scored by Matthias Herget
No.	Date	Venue	Opponent	Score	Result	Competition
1	30 April 1985	Strahov Stadium, Prague, Czechoslovakia	Czechoslovakia	4–0	5–1	1986 World Cup qualification
2	25 September 1985	Råsunda Stadion, Stockholm, Sweden	Sweden	2–0	2–2	1986 World Cup qualification
3	5 February 1986	Stadio Partenio-Adriano Lombardi, Avellino, Italy	Italy	1–1	2–1	Friendly
4	14 May 1986	Westfalenstadion, Dortmund, West Germany	Netherlands	3–1	3–1	Friendly

== Honours ==
Bayer Uerdingen

- DFB-Pokal: 1984–85

West Germany

- FIFA World Cup runner-up: 1986

Individual

- kicker Bundesliga Team of the Season: 1983–84, 1984–85
