= Casco de Leiro =

Bronze Age ritual hemispherical cap

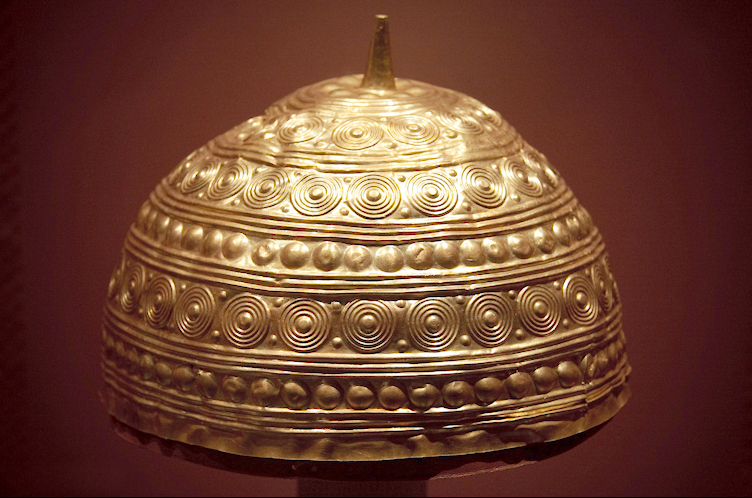
- Material: Gold
- Height: 15 cm
- Width: 19.5 cm
- Created: c. 900 BC
- Discovered: 7 April 1976; Leiro, Galicia, Spain
- Discovered by: Jose Somoza

The gold Casco de Leiro ("Helmet of Leiro") is a ritual hemispherical cap probably dating to the end of the Late Bronze Age (circa 1,000 to 800 BC) in the town of Leiro (municipality of Rianxo, Galicia, Spain). The circumstances of its discovery show that technically it constitutes part of a hoard.

The cap, hammered from a single casting of gold, is entirely covered with registers of repeated repoussé decoration, hammered over bronze molds, of repeated bosses alternating with bands of repeated concentric circles. The central point is applied with a flat-sided point in the form of a truncated cone. Its maximum diameter is 19.5 cm with a height of 15 cm to the base of the point, it weighs 270 grams.

Its registers of hammered decoration present parallels with the decors of late Bronze Age conical golden hats of the Schifferstadt type, as well as the Comerford crown (from Ireland) and the gold bowls found at Axtroki, Guipúzcoa, or the so-called Treasure of Villena, Alicante. There is a possibility that its uses were twofold: as a ritual basin, though it is decoratively pierced with an awl, and inverted as an emblem of authority.

The casque was a chance discovery made by a fisherman, José Vicente Somoza, on 7 April 1976 at a small rocky point called Curruncho dos Porcos, by the beach at Leiro (Rianxo) in Galicia, Spain. The site, on the large estuary called the Ría de Arousa, is part of the estuary system of the Ulla, which offers "optimum conditions for navigation" and has served since time immemorial as an easy passage into the heart of Galicia. Removing some earth to flatten a space for a shed in which to beach his boat, he struck a coarsely made earthenware crock that broke as he struck it. He immediately saw that it contained a gold object, and he reported the find to the Guardia Civil of Rianxo and the Department of Archaeology at the Instituto de Estudios Gallegos Padre Sarmiento. The find was transferred to the Museo Arqueolóxico e Histórico of A Coruña, where it is conserved.

== See also ==
- Atlantic Bronze Age
