= Golden hat (disambiguation) =

Golden hat can refer to:

- Golden hat - a set of four conical shaped golden hats dating to between 1400 BC and 800 BC
- Golden Hat Trophy - awarded to the winner of the Red River Shootout college football game and now one of three trophies awarded after the game
