= Balkåkra Ritual Object =

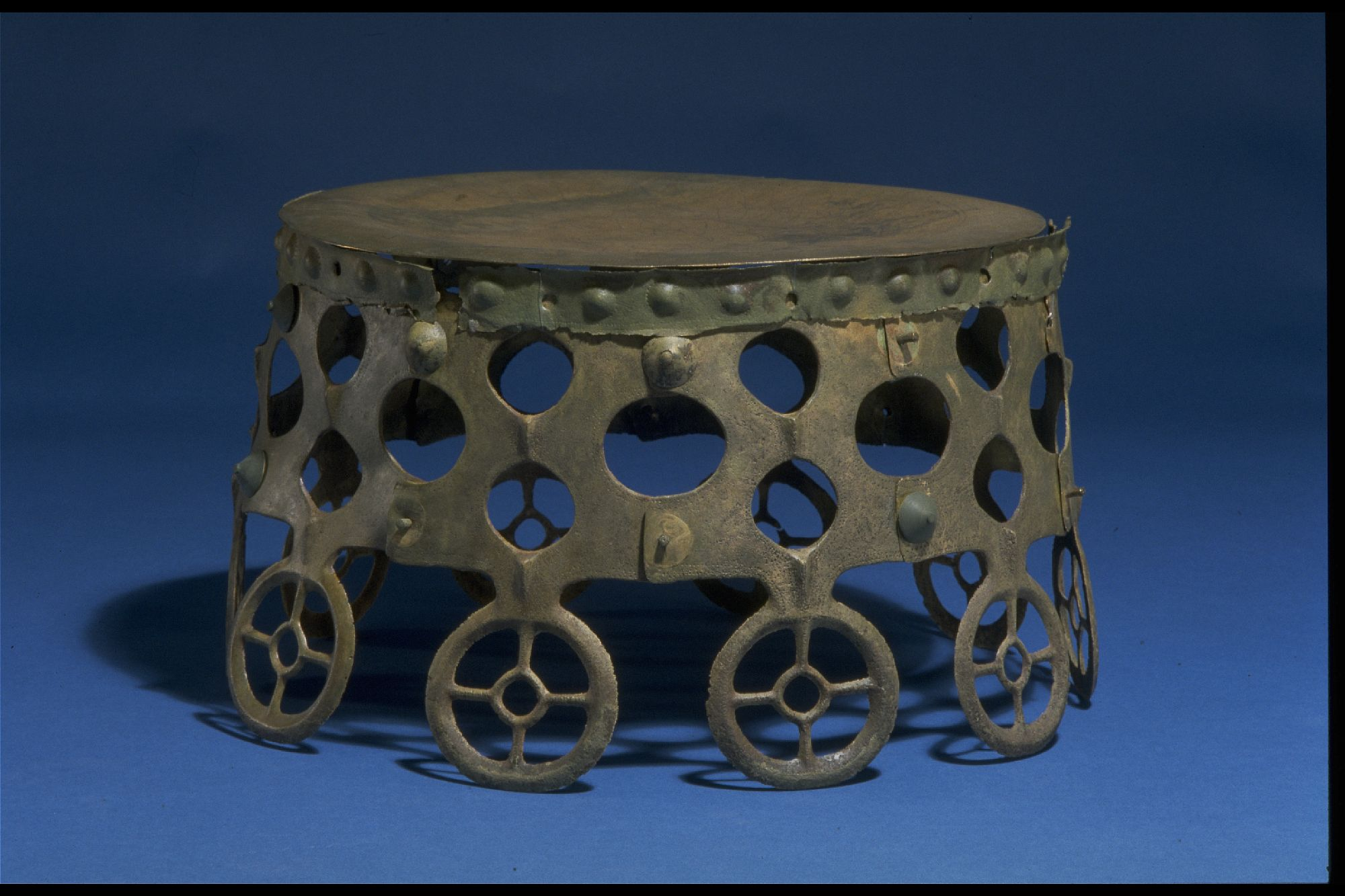
- side view
- Material: Bronze
- Width: 42 cm
- Created: c. 1400 BC
- Discovered: 1847; Sweden

The Balkåkra Ritual Object is an item from the Bronze Age found in Balkåkra, Sweden in 1847. Its use and purpose remain unknown.

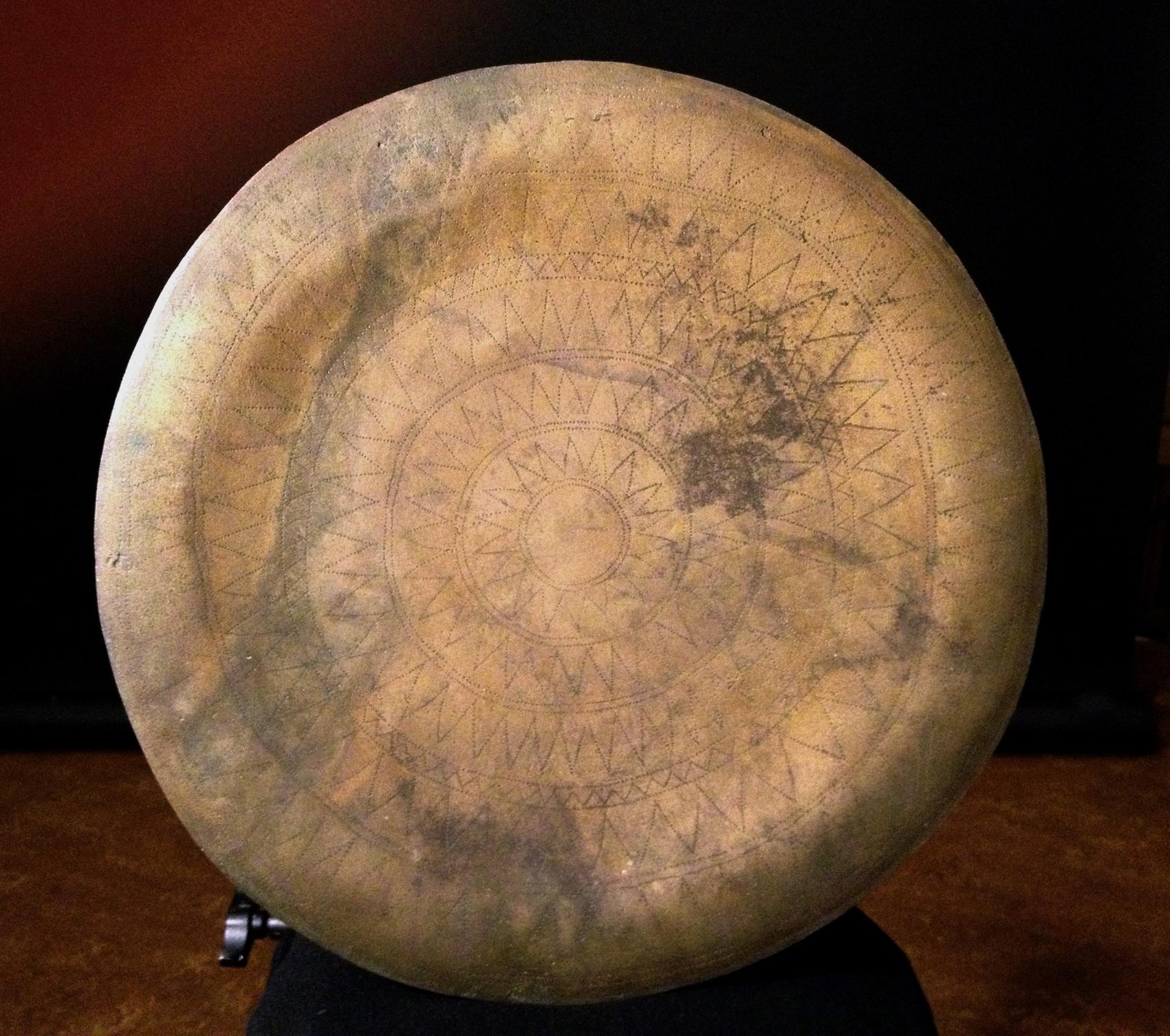
Balkåkra Ritual Object, view of the bronze disc.

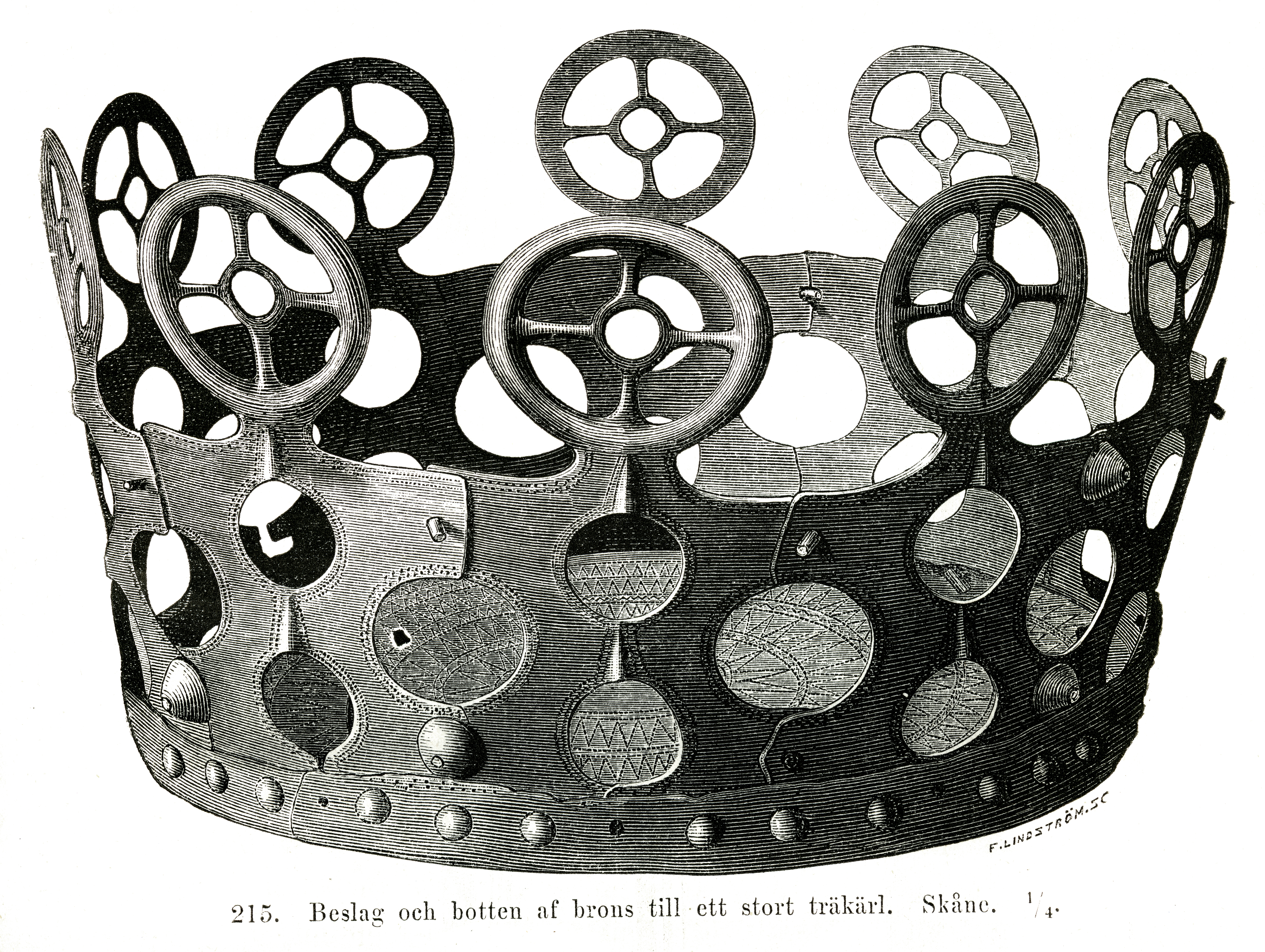
Balkåkra Ritual Object, lateral view

== History ==
The object was found in a bog in Balkåkra socken close to Ystad in Scania, Sweden in 1847. It has been dated to c. 1500 – 1300 BC, i.e. early Nordic Bronze Age. A later date in the Urnfield period, 900-800 BC has also been suggested by other authors. A similar item was discovered in 1913 in Haschendorf/Hasfalva in Austria, not far from Sopron in Hungary. It has been suggested that the object found in Balkåkra may have been imported from the Danube region or northern Italy and not produced locally. A similar miniature object of Nuragic origin was found in Vulci, Italy, together with a Nuragic 'priest' (or priestess) figurine wearing a conical hat. The Vulci find has been dated to the 9th century BC but the objects may be significantly older. The similarity with the miniature object from Vulci is the basis for the alternative dating of the Balkara object to 900-800 BC.

== Description ==
The item consists of a round frame made of bronze perforated with holes and carried by ten wheels. A flat and loose bronze disc placed on top of it. The disc is decorated with concentric zig-zag patterns. The diameter of the disc is 42 centimetres (17 in) and is slightly concave.

The inside of the Haschendorf ritual object is marked with two sets of engraved lines indicating numbers or simple numerals from I to IIIII (I, II, III, IIII, IIIII). The same numbers appear on the Balkåkra object where they are marked with dots instead of lines. These are thought to represent instructions for assembly of the objects. The repeated use of numbers 10, 20 and 30 in the construction of the Balkåkra and Haschendorf objects suggests the use of a ten-digit system (10 side pieces with 10 'wheels', held together by 20 nails with large conical heads, and a ribbon at the top with 10 similar nails and 30 large bosses for decoration, with 30 large circular openings in the side panel).

== Interpretation ==
It is not known what purpose the item served, but it has been assumed that it had a ritual use. Suggestions have been made that it could have been a gong, a drum, a throne, a burning glass or an 'astronomical tool'.

The concentric zig-zag lines on both discs are thought to represent the rays of the sun. They have also been interpreted as encoding a solar calendar. The four-spoked wheel was also a common solar symbol in the European Bronze Age.

The finding of a similar miniature object together with a Nuragic figurine is of particular interest. Nuragic 'priest' figurines, often depicted with tall conical hats, have been compared to the conical Golden Hats from central Europe, dating from the Middle and Late Bronze Age, which are thought to have been worn by priests, and possibly 'astronomer-priests' or 'priest-kings'. The symbols on the Berlin Gold Hat have been interpreted as a luni-solar calendar based on the Metonic cycle. Both the Nuragic figurines and golden hats have also been compared to petroglyphs and figurines from the Nordic Bronze Age, such as petroglyphs in the Kivik Kings' Grave in Sweden.

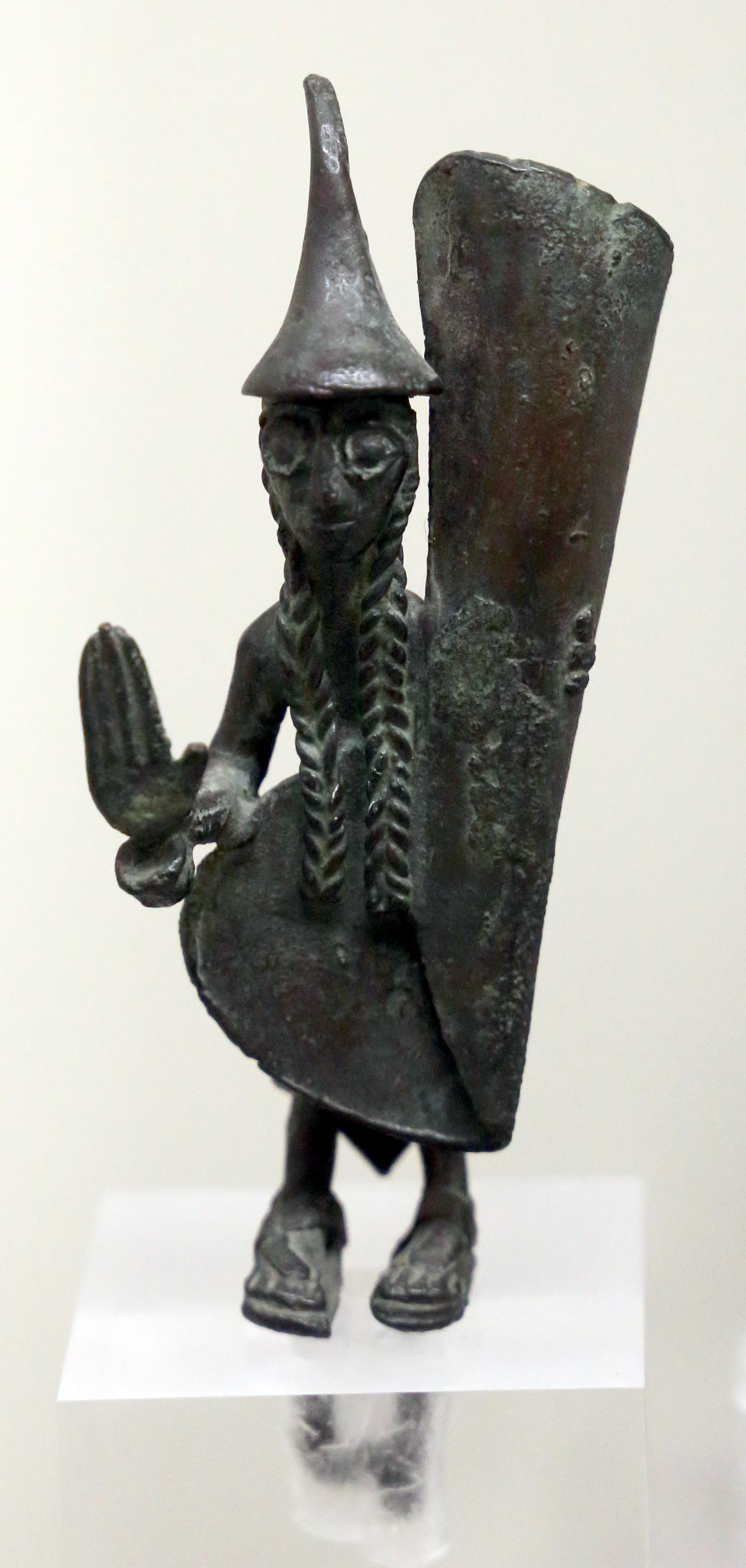
Nuragic figurine from Vulci, Italy

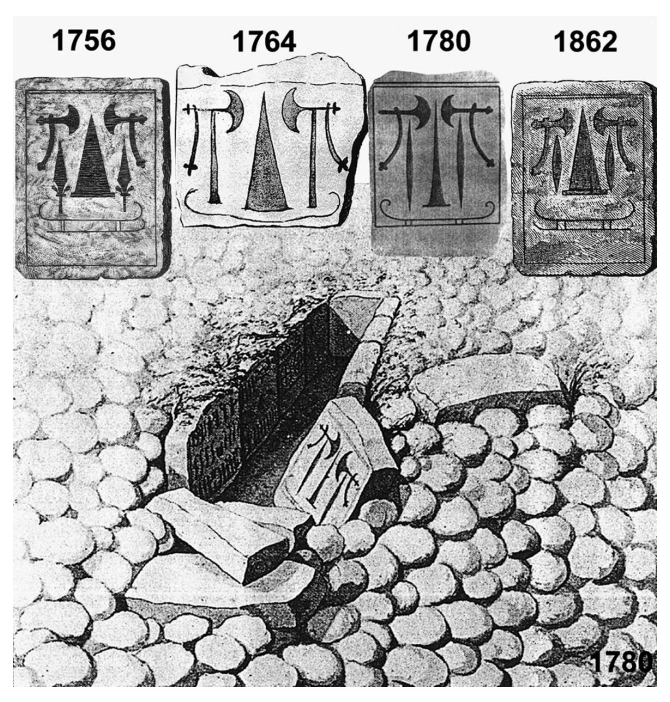
Petroglyphs in the Kivik King's Grave, Sweden

== See also ==
- Nebra Sky Disc
- Trundholm Sun Chariot
