= Gold hat =

Bronze Age Europe artefacts

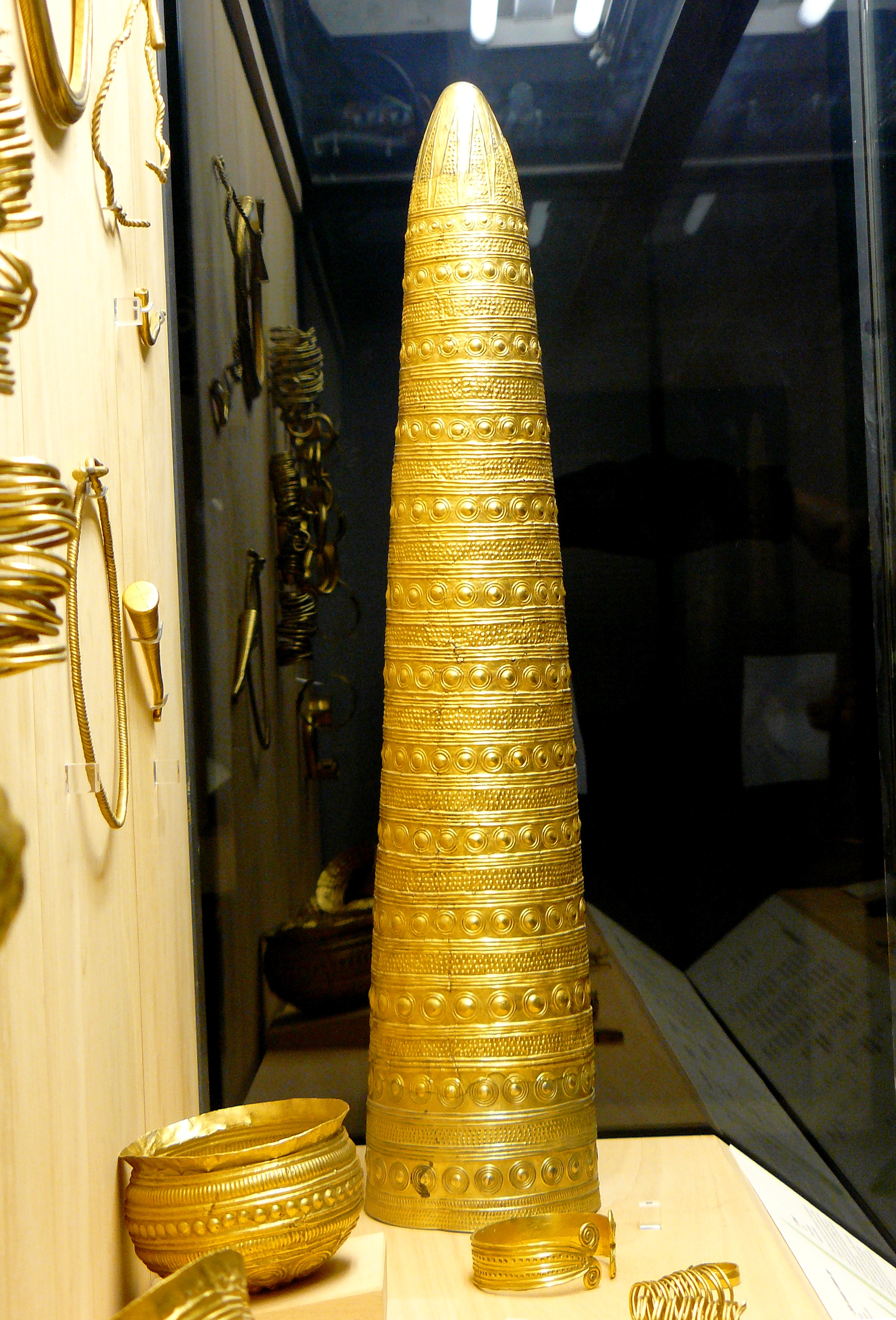
Avanton gold hat, c. 1400 BC

Gold hats (or golden hats) (German: Goldhüte, singular: Goldhut) are a very specific and rare type of archaeological artefact from Bronze Age Europe. So far, four such objects are known and formally classified as "cone-shaped gold hats of the Schifferstadt type". The objects are made of thin sheet gold and were attached externally to long conical and brimmed headdresses which were probably made of some organic material and served to stabilise the external gold leaf. The following conical gold hats are known:

- Avanton Gold Cone, incomplete, found at Avanton near Poitiers in 1844, c. 1400 BC.
- Golden Hat of Schifferstadt, found in 1835 at Schifferstadt near Speyer, c. 1400–1300 BC.
- Golden Cone of Ezelsdorf-Buch, found near Ezelsdorf near Nuremberg in 1953, c. 1000–900 BC; the tallest known specimen at roughly 90 cm (35 in).
- Berlin Gold Hat, found probably in Swabia or Switzerland, acquired by the Museum für Vor- und Frühgeschichte, Berlin, in 1996, c. 1000–800 BC.

The archaeological contexts of the cones are not very clear; for the Berlin specimen, the context is entirely unknown. At least two of the known examples (Berlin and Schifferstadt) appear to have been deliberately and carefully buried in antiquity.

Although none can be dated precisely, their technology suggests that they were probably made between 1400–800 BC.

== Gallery ==
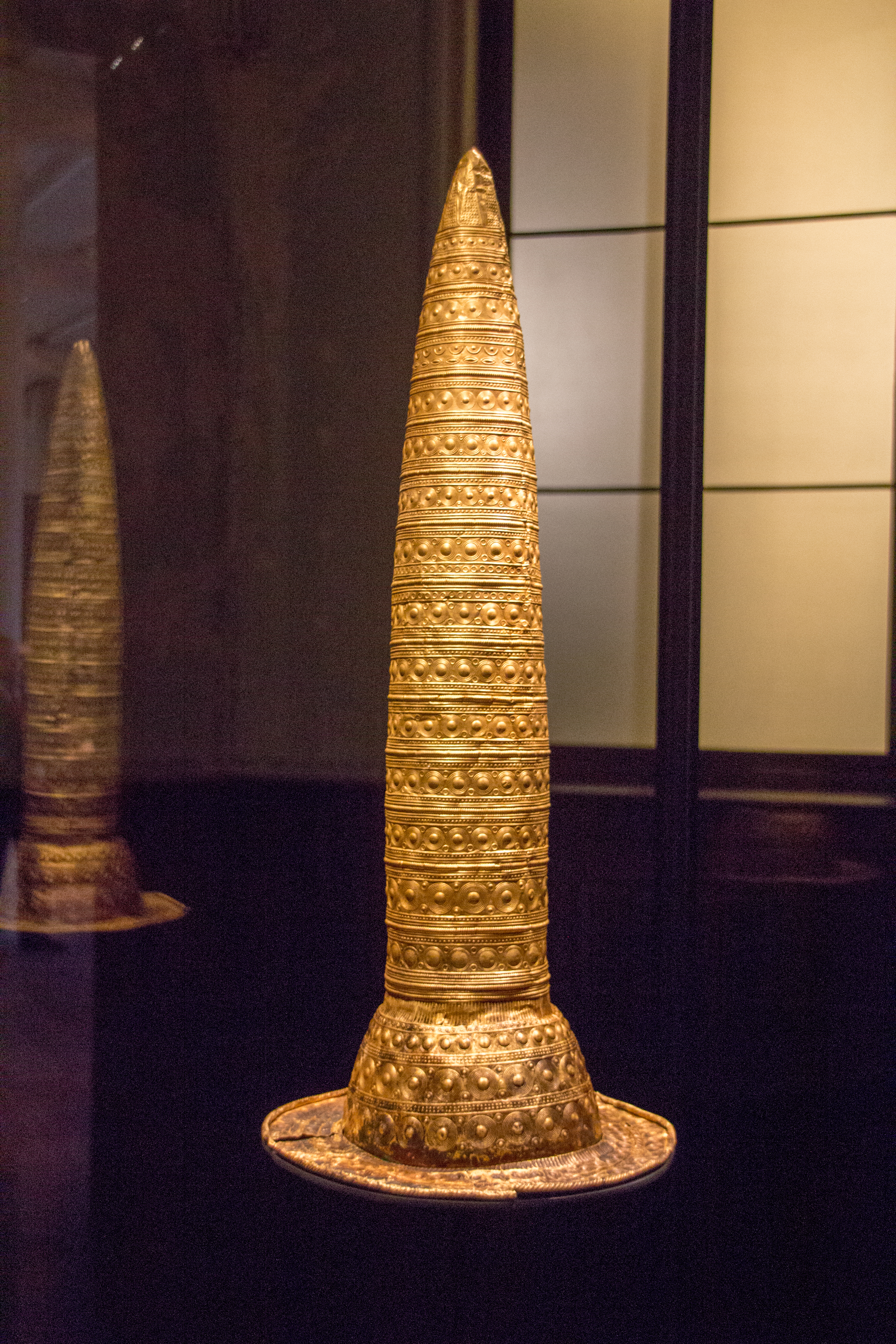
Berlin, Neues Museum

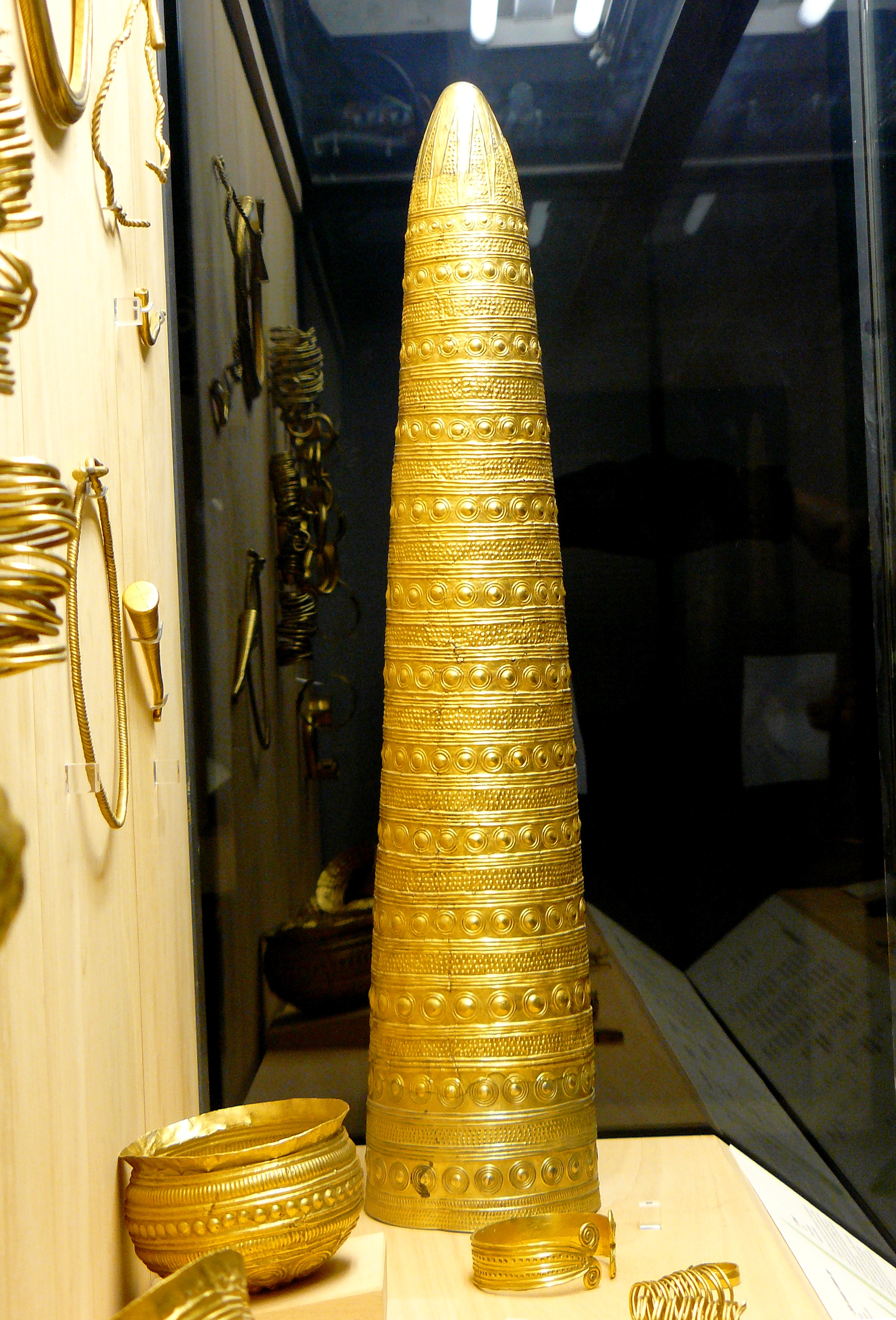
Avanton, National Archaeological Museum, France

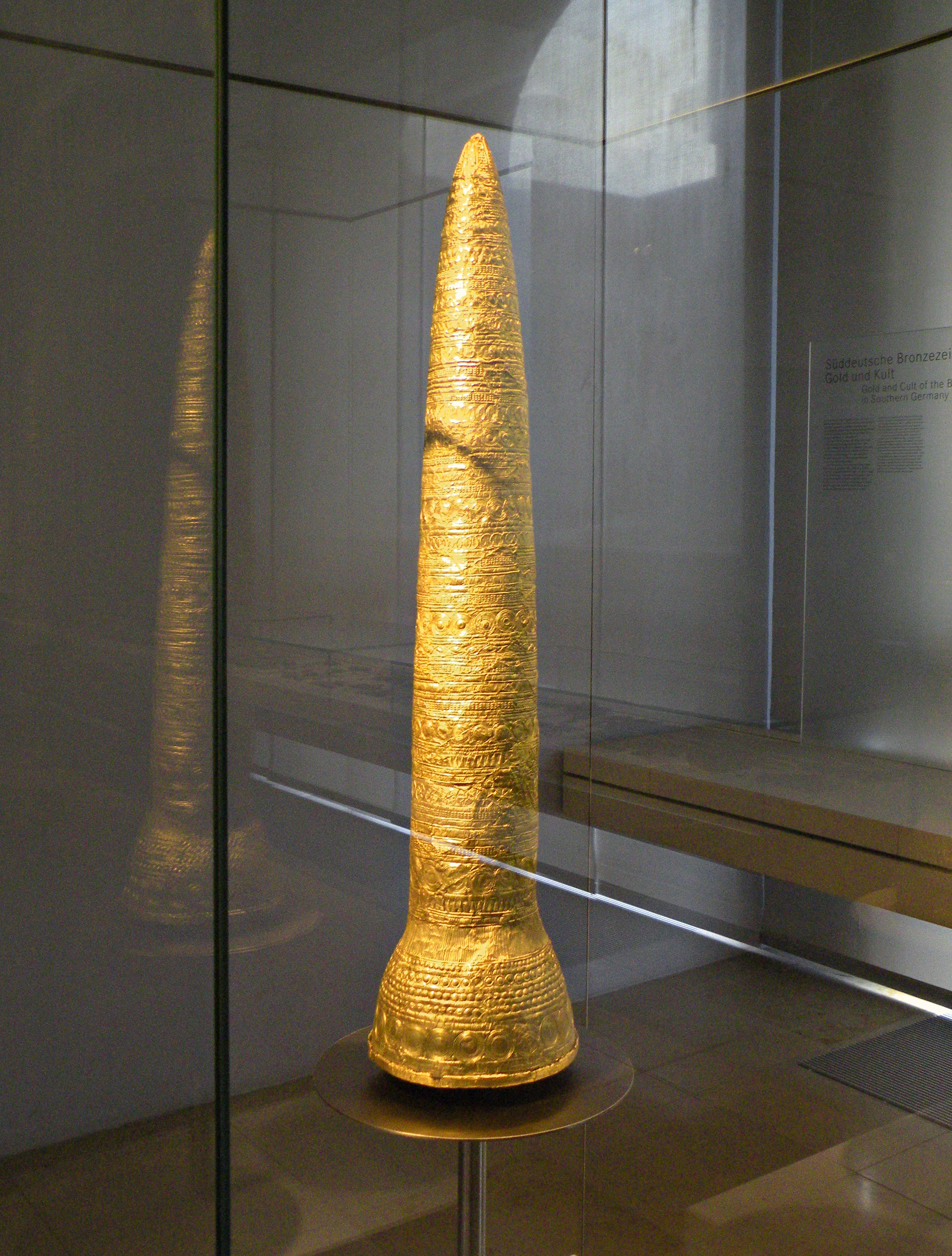
Ezelsdorf-Buch, Germanisches National Museum

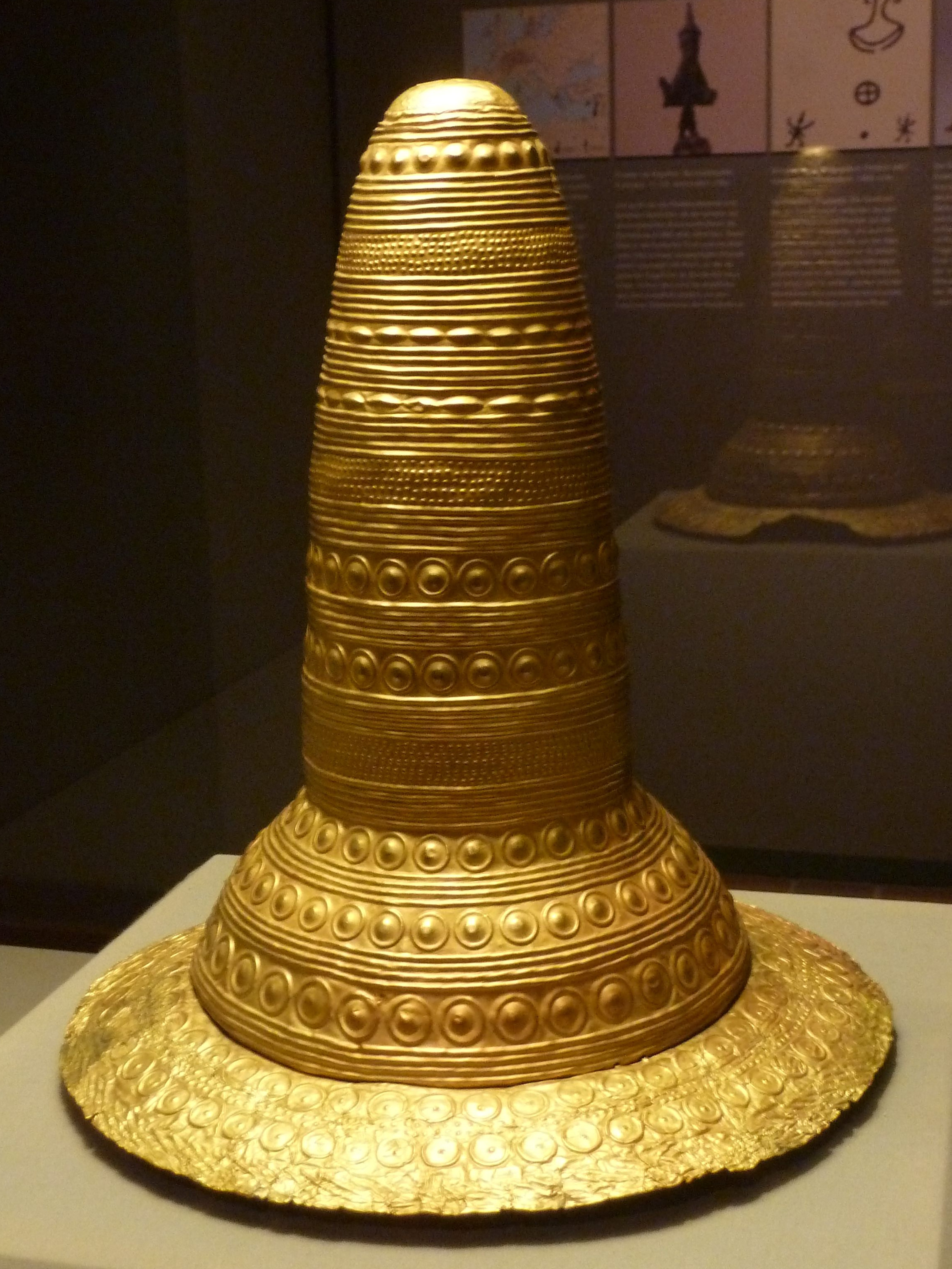
Schifferstadt, Historical Museum of the Palatinate

== Cultural context ==
The hats are associated with the Bronze Age Tumulus culture and Urnfield culture. Their close similarities in symbolism and techniques of manufacture are testimony to a coherent Bronze Age culture over a wide-ranging territory in western and central Europe. A comparable golden pectoral was found at Mold, Flintshire, in northern Wales, which is of somewhat earlier date.

The cone-shaped gold hats of Schifferstadt type are assumed to be connected with a number of comparable cap or crown-shaped gold leaf objects from Ireland (Comerford Crown, discovered in 1692 and since lost) and the Atlantic coast of Spain (gold leaf crowns of Leiro and Axtroki), as well as various gold bowls (such as the Eberswalde Hoard), vessels, ornaments and diadems (such as the Velem diadem from Hungary) from across central and northern Europe. According to Sperber (2003) the Schifferstadt-type conical gold hats may have originated from contact with Atlantic Bronze Age cultures.

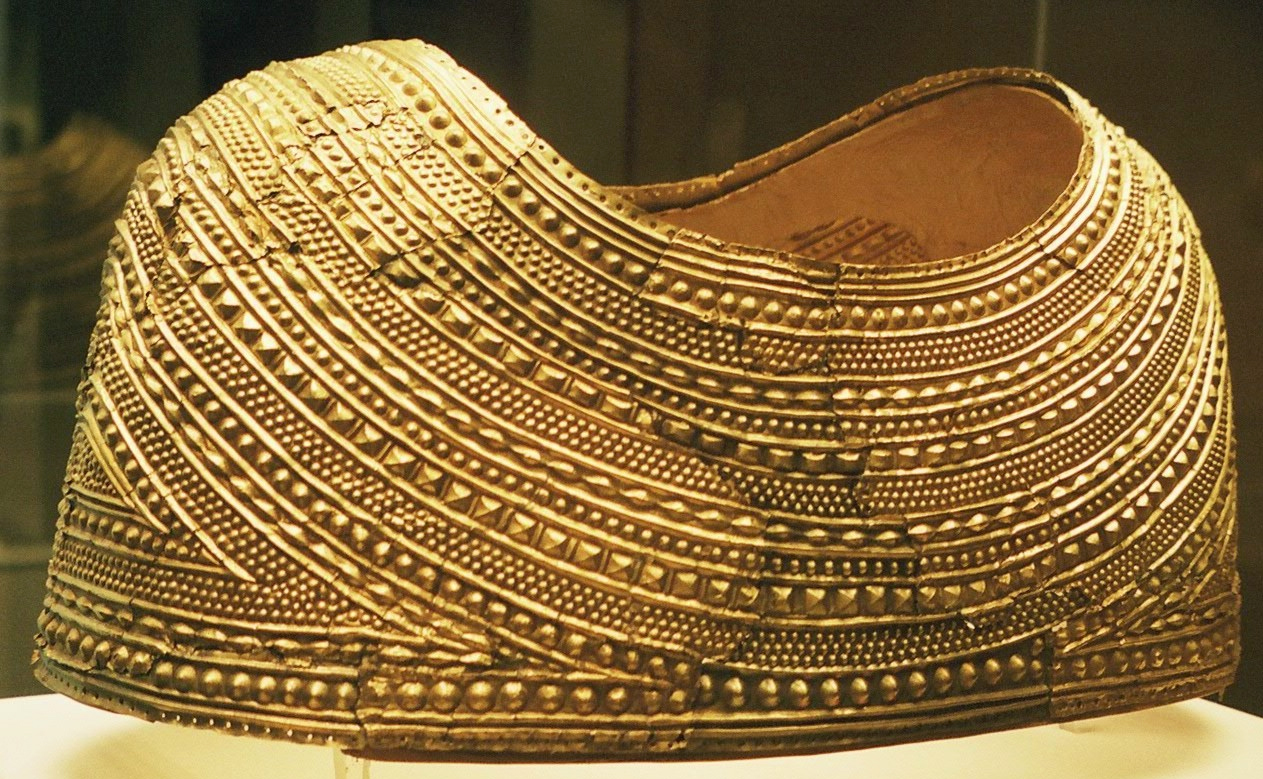
Mold gold cape, Wales, c. 1900-1700 BC.

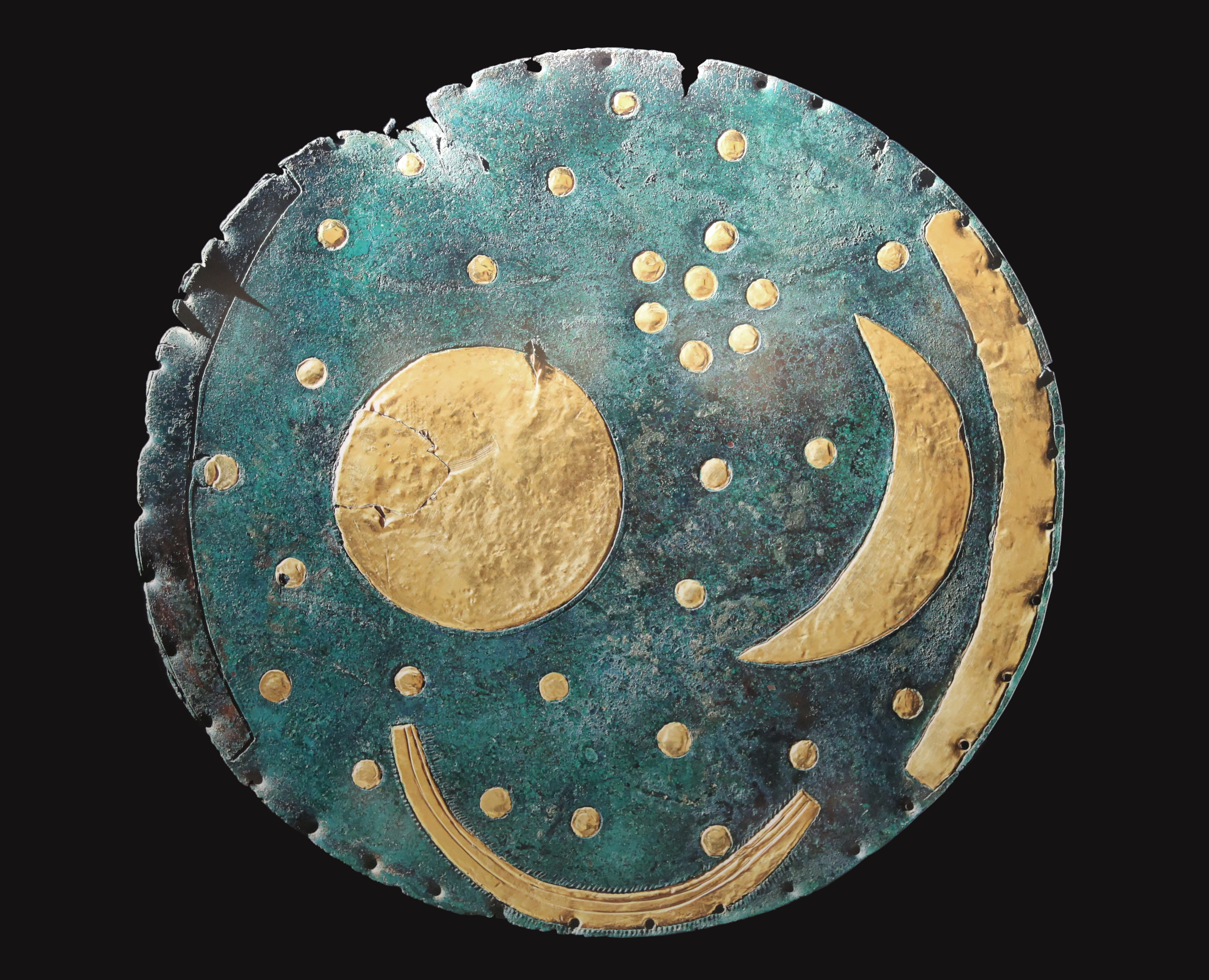
Nebra Sky Disc, Germany, c. 1800 BC

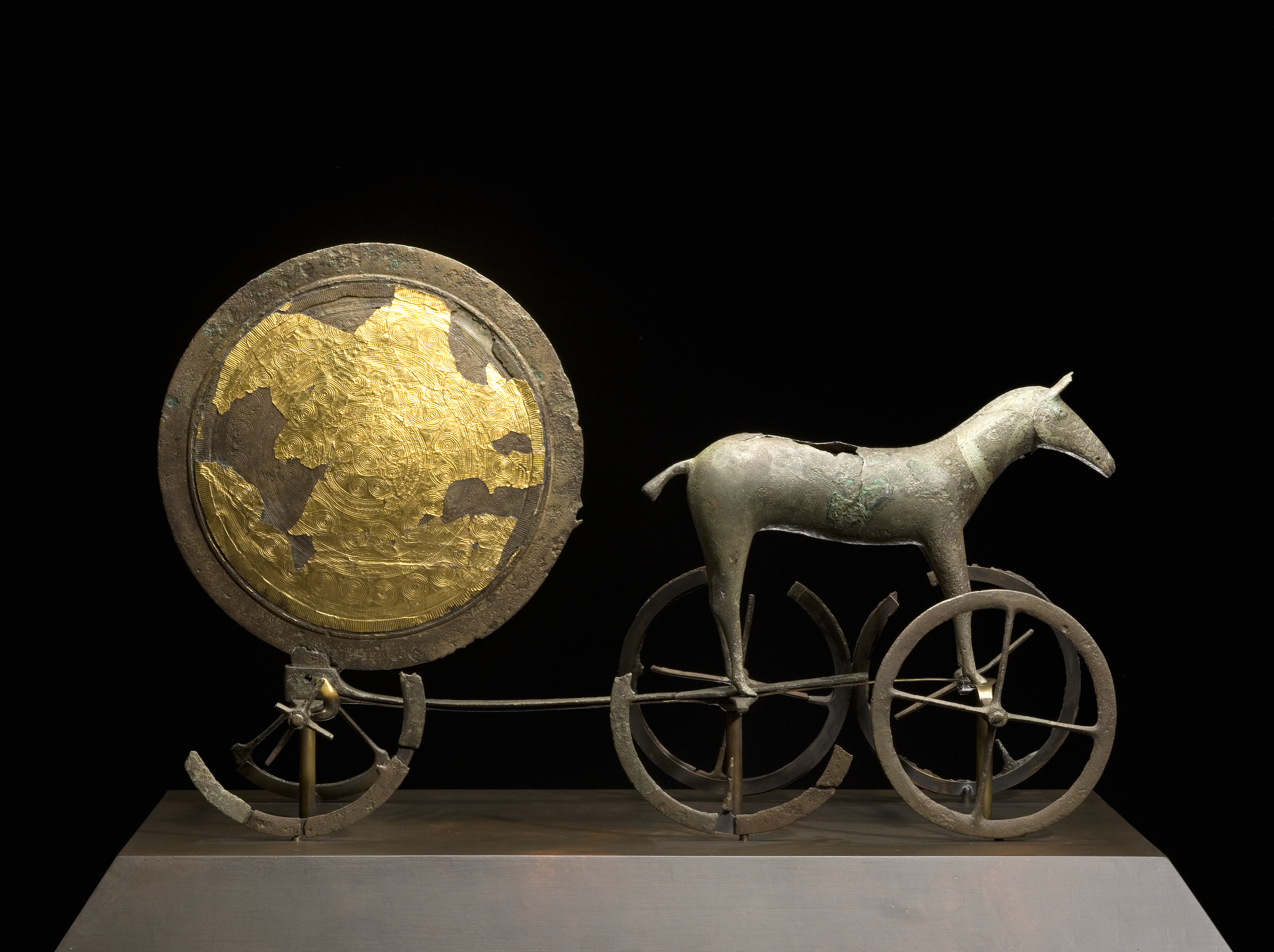
Trundholm sun chariot, Denmark, c. 1500-1300 BC

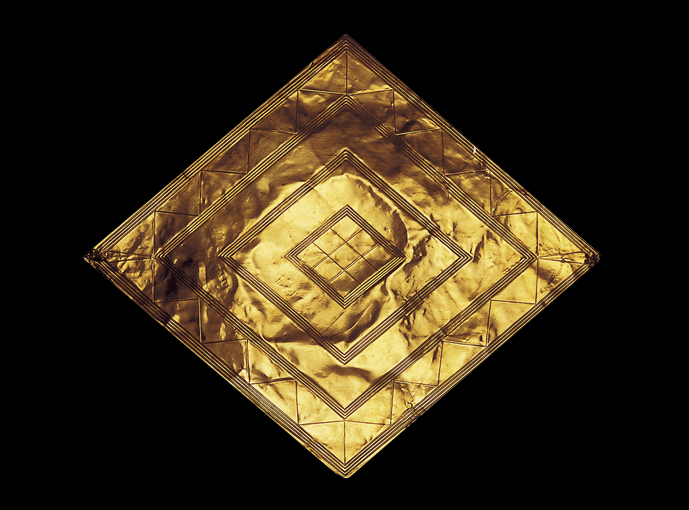
Bush Barrow gold lozenge, England, c. 1900 BC

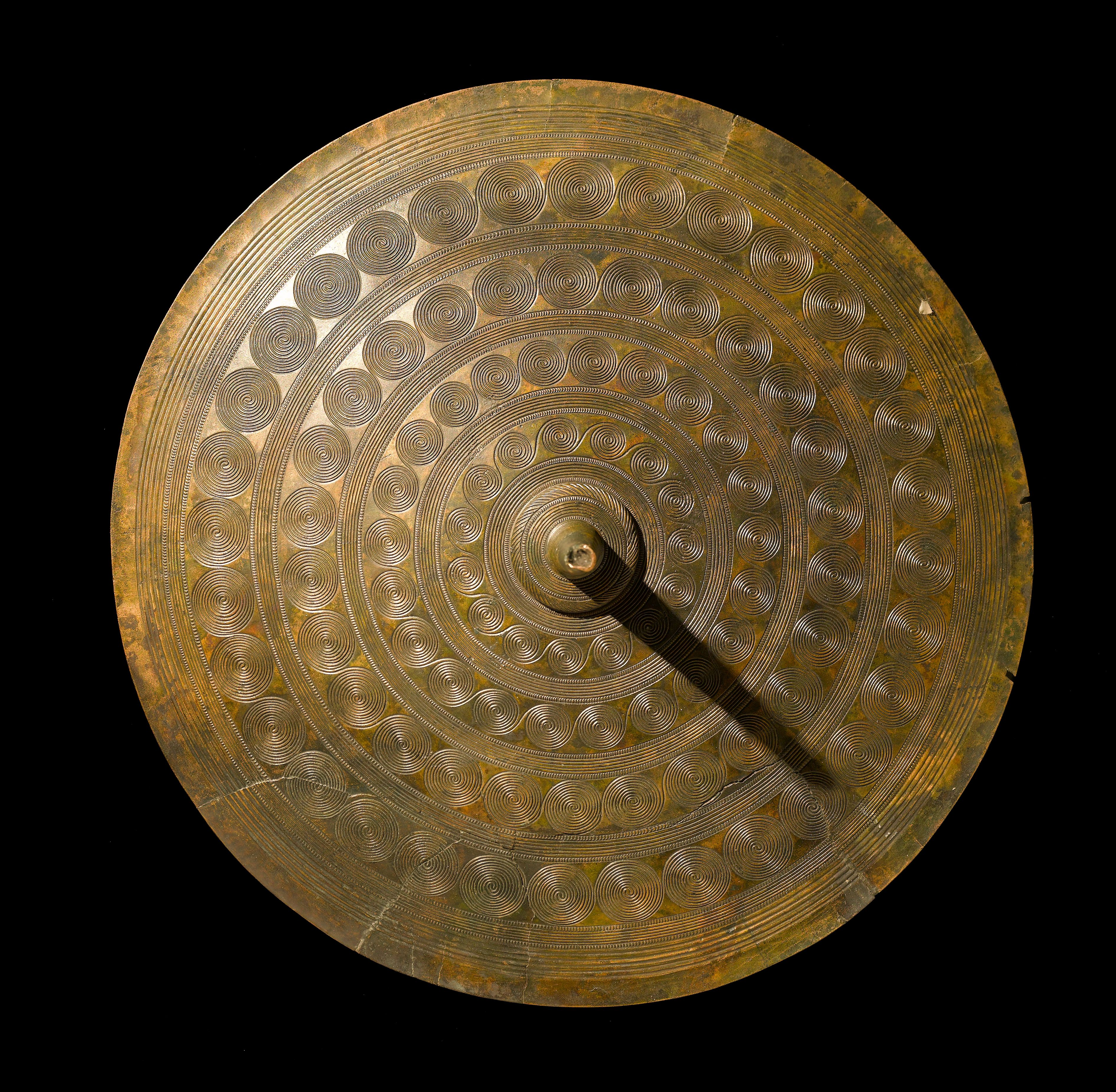
Langstrup belt-plate, Denmark, c. 1400 BC

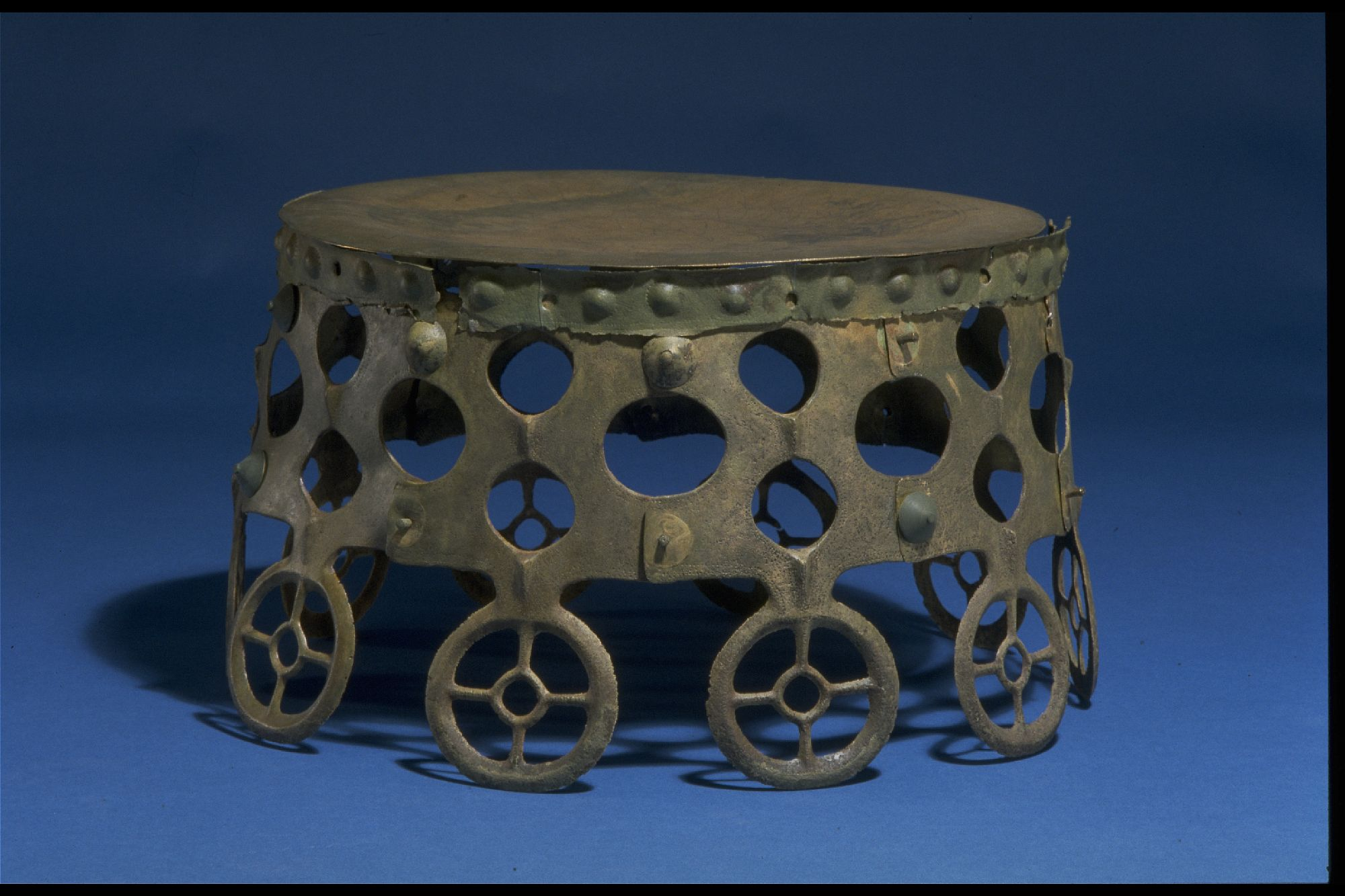
Balkåkra ritual object, Denmark, c. 1400 BC

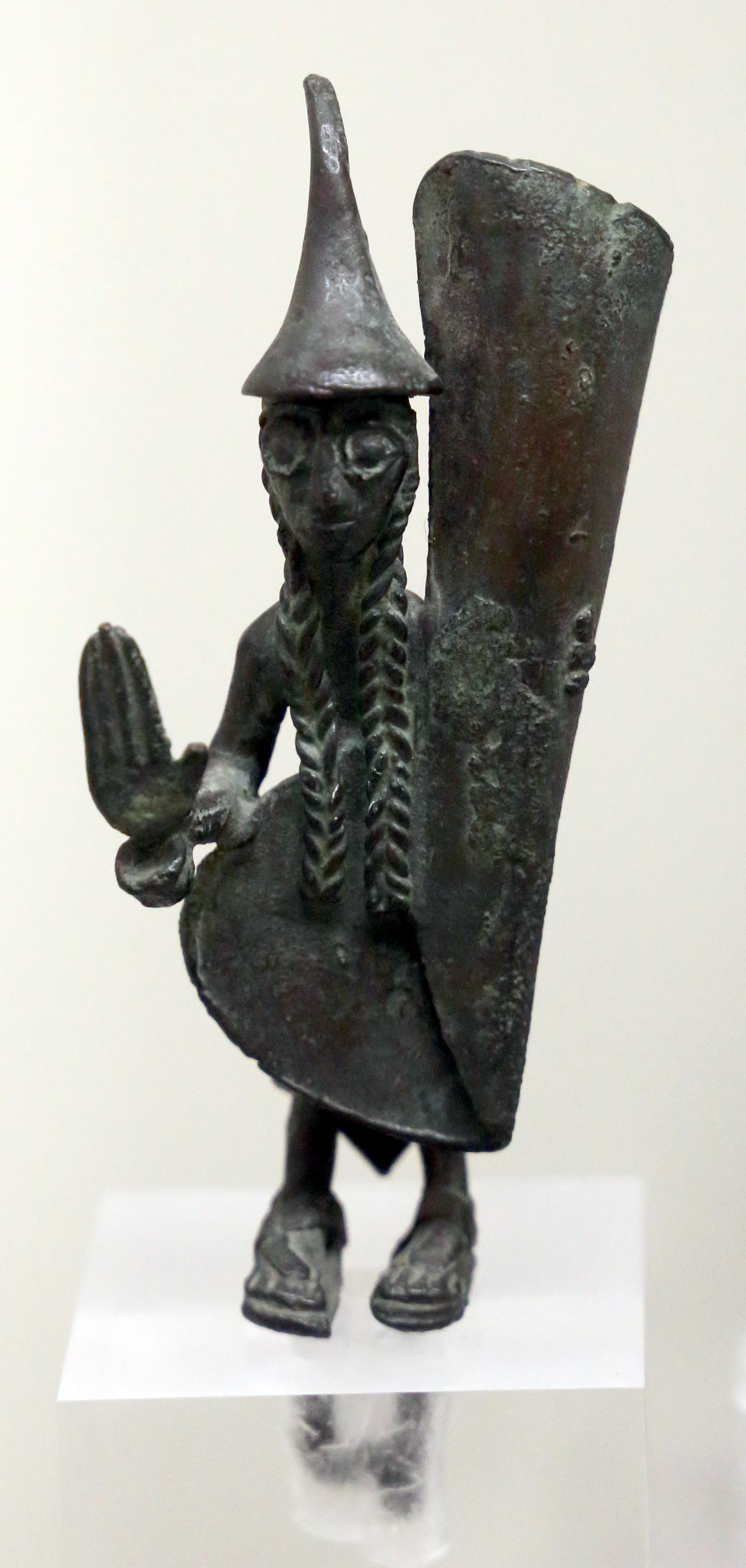
Nuragic figurine from Vulci, Italy, 9th century BC

== Function ==
It is assumed that the gold hats served as religious insignia for the deities or priests of a sun cult then widespread in Central Europe. Their use as headgear is strongly supported by the fact that the three of four examples have a cap-like widening at the bottom of the cone, and that their openings are oval (not round), with diameters and shapes roughly equivalent to those of a human skull. The figural depiction of an object resembling a conical hat on a stone slab of the King's Grave at Kivik, Southern Sweden, strongly supports their association with religion and cult, as does the fact that the known examples appear to have been deposited (buried) carefully.

Attempts to decipher the gold hats' ornamentation suggest that their cultic role is accompanied or complemented by their use as complex calendrical devices. Whether they were really used for such purposes, or simply presented the underlying astronomical knowledge, remains unknown.

== Calendars ==
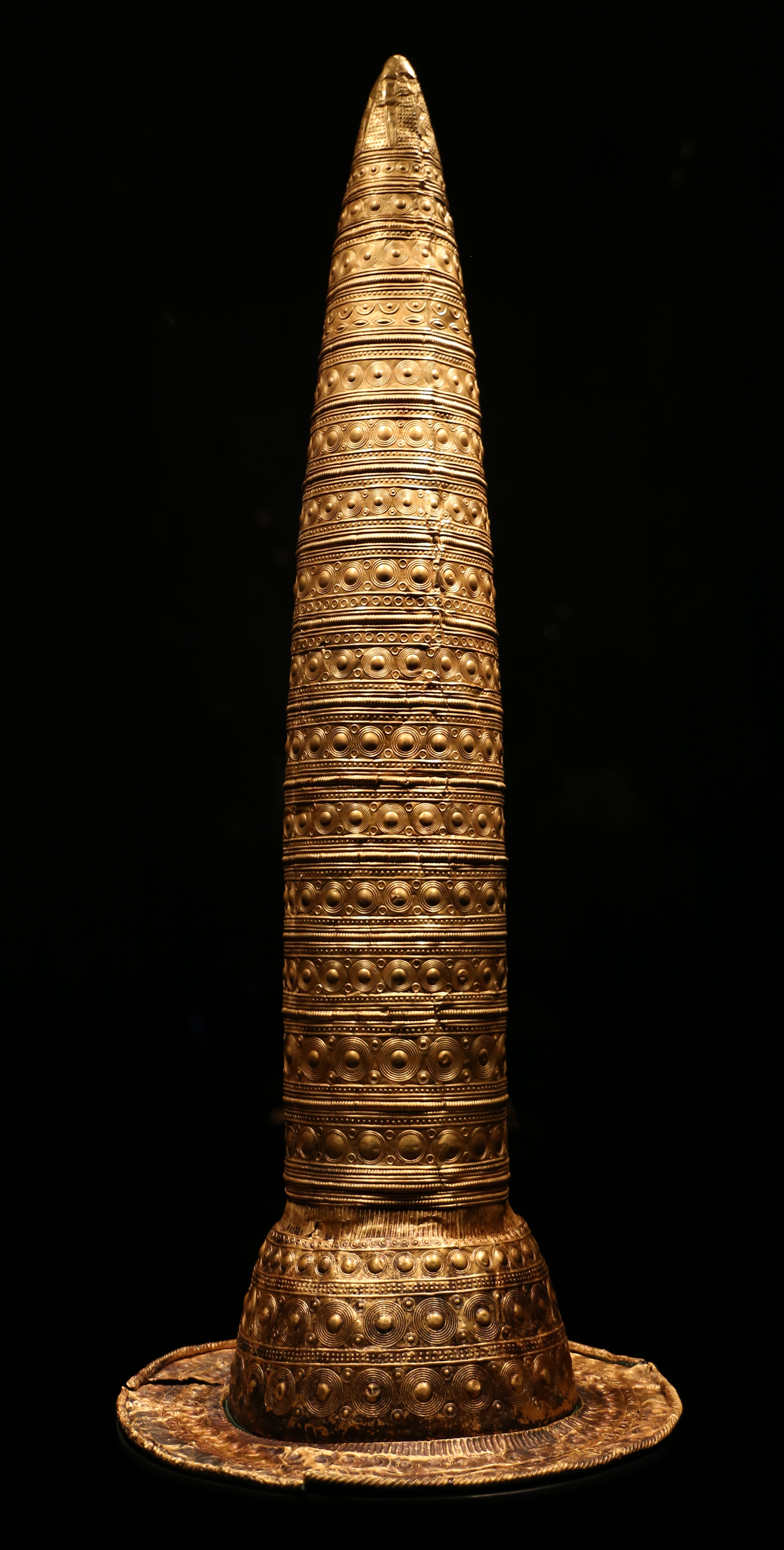
Berlin Gold Hat

The gold cones are covered in bands of ornaments along their whole length and extent. The ornaments - mostly disks and concentric circles, sometimes wheels - were punched using stamps, rolls or combs. The older examples (Avanton, Schifferstadt) show a more restricted range of ornaments than the later ones.

It appears to be the case that the ornaments on all known gold hats represent systematic sequences in terms of number and types of ornaments per band.

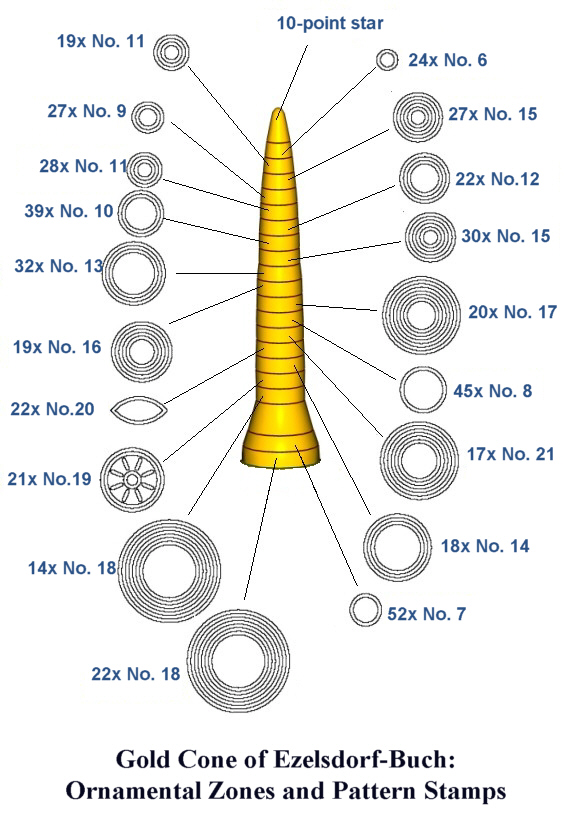
Ezelsdorf-Buch

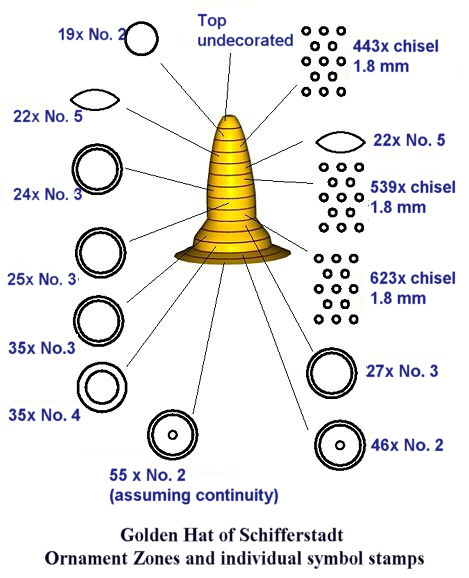
Schifferstadt

A detailed study of the Berlin example, which is fully preserved, claimed that the symbols possibly represent a lunisolar calendar. The object may have permitted the determination of dates or periods in both lunar and solar calendars.

Since an exact knowledge of the solar year was of special interest for the determination of religiously important events, such as the summer and winter solstices, if astronomical knowledge was depicted on the gold hats, it would have been of high value to Bronze Age society. Whether the hats themselves were indeed used for determining such dates, or whether they even represented such knowledge, remains unknown.

The functions hypothesised so far would permit the counting of temporal units of up to 57 lunar months. A simple multiplication of such values could also permit the calculation of longer periods, e.g. metonic cycles.

Each symbol, or each ring of a symbol, may represent a single day. Apart from ornament bands incorporating differing numbers of rings there are seemingly special symbols and zones in intercalary areas, which may have had to be added to or subtracted from the periods in question.

The system of this mathematical function incorporated into the artistic ornamentation has not been fully deciphered so far, but a schematic study of the Berlin Golden Hat and the periods it may delimit has been attempted.

In principle, according to this theory, starting with zone Z_{i} , a sum is achieved by adding a relevant contiguous number of neighbouring sections: Z_{i} ... Z_{i+n} . To reach the equivalent lunar or solar value, from this initial sum must be subtracted the sum of symbols from the intercalary zone(s) within the area counted.

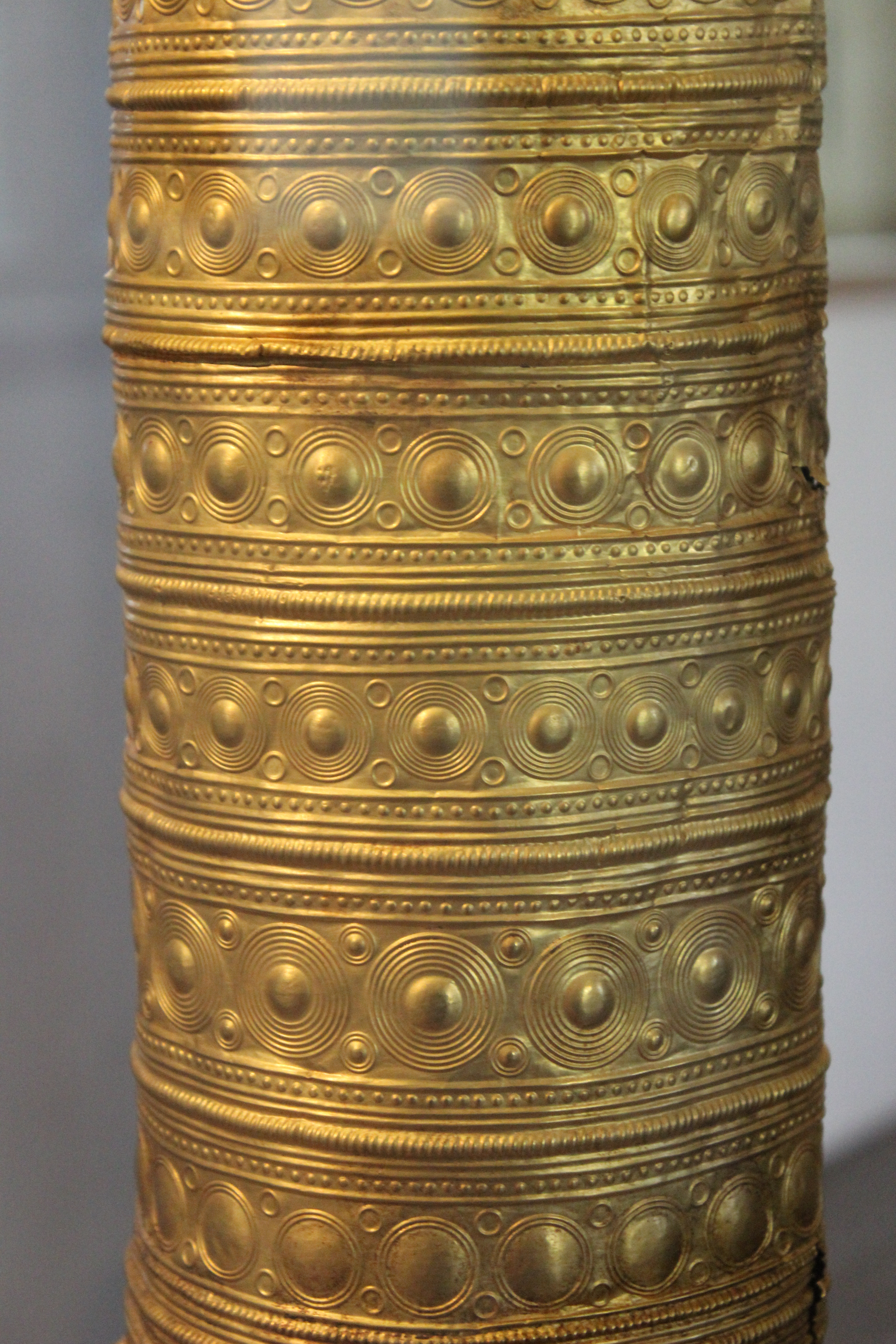
Berlin Gold Hat, detail

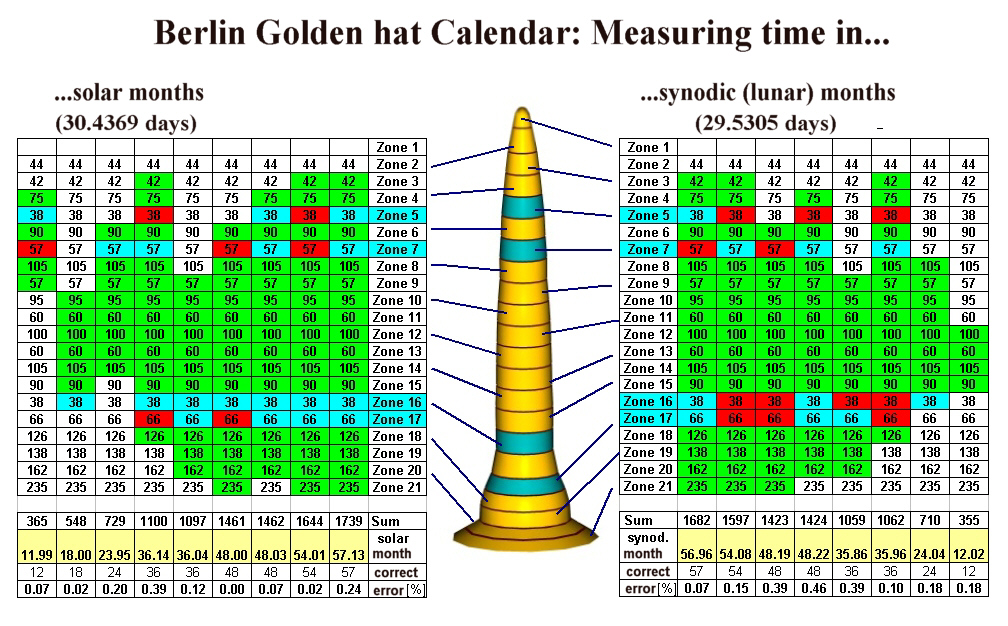
The Calendar theory.

The illustration depicts the solar representation on the left and the lunar one on the right. The red or blue fields in zones 5, 7, 16, and 17 are intercalary zones.

The values in the individual fields are reached by multiplying the number of symbols per zone with the number of rings or circles incorporated in each predominant symbol. The special symbols in zone 5 are assigned the value of "38", as indicated by their number.

(For example: Zone 12 is dominated by 20 repetitions of punched symbol No. 14, a circular disc symbol surrounded by 5 concentric circles. Thus, the symbol has the value of 20 × 5 = 100 . The smaller ring symbols placed between the larger repetitions of No. 14 are considered as mere ornaments and thus not counted.)

Through this system, the hats could be used to calculate a lunisolar calendar system, i.e. a direct reading in either lunar or solar dates, as well as the conversion between them.

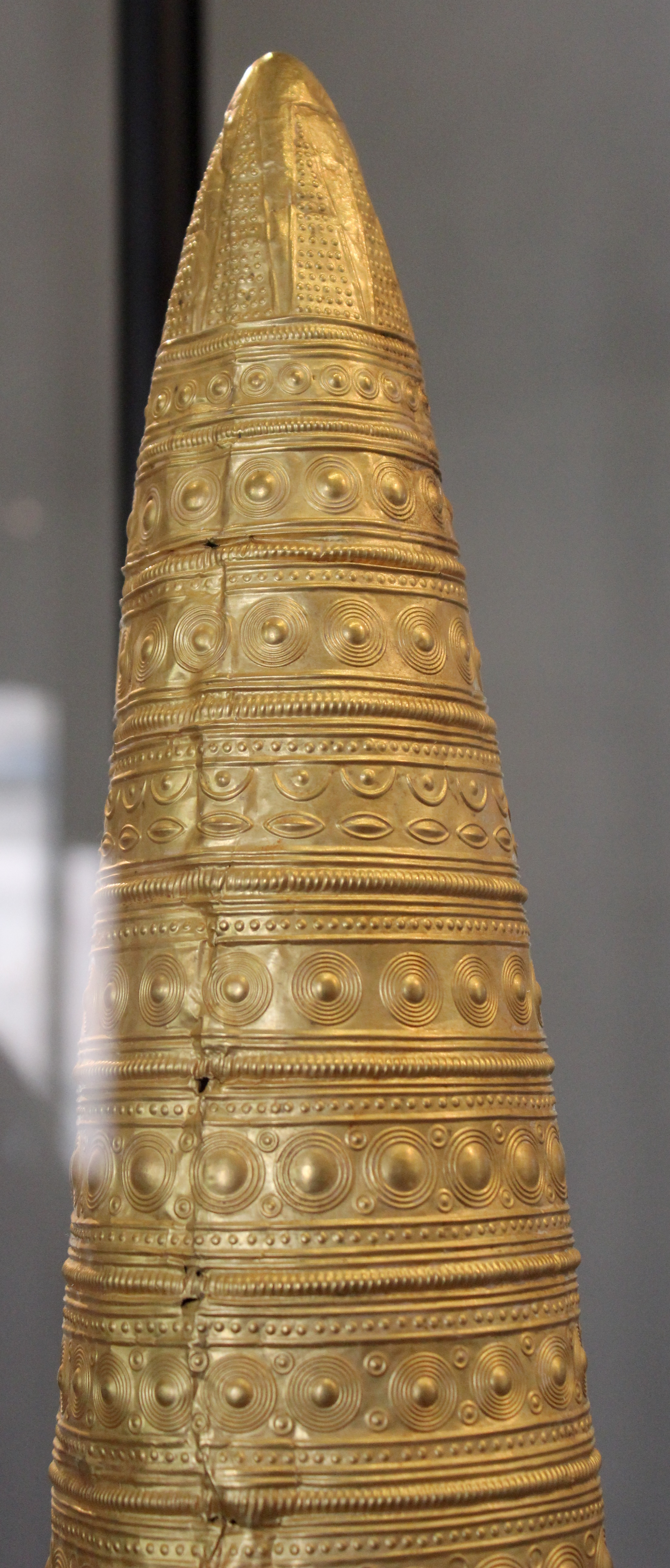
Berlin Gold Hat, detail

The table can be used in the same way as the original gold hats may have been. To determine the number of days in a specific time period (yellow fields), the values of the coloured fields above are added, reaching an intermediate sum. If any of the red intercalary zones are included, their sum has to be subtracted. This allows the calculation of 12, 24, 36, 48, 54, and 57 synodic months in the lunar system and of 12, 18, 24, 36, 48, 54, and 57 solar months (i.e. twelfths of a tropical year).

(For example: To determine a 54 month cycle in the lunar system, the numerical values of the green or blue zones 3 to 21 are added, reaching a sum of 1,739 days. From this, the values of the red 'intercalary' fields 5, 16, and 17 are subtracted, The result is 1739 - 142 = 1597 days, or 54 synodic months of 29.5305 days each.)

The overall discrepancy of 2 days to the astronomically accurate value is probably the result of a slight imprecision in the Bronze Age observation of synodic and solar month.

Similar symbols are found on the gold bowls of the Eberswalde hoard. According to the Neues Museum, Berlin: “Gold vessels in the Eberswalde hoard bear sun and circular symbols like those on the Berlin gold hat. Some of these contain calendrical information as well."

== Manufacture ==
The gold hats known so far are made from a gold alloy containing 85–90% gold, about 10% silver and traces of copper and tin (< 1% each). They are made of seamless single pieces of gold sheet, hammered to a thinness between 0.25 millimetres (0.0098 in) (Schifferstadt) and 0.6 millimetres (0.024 in) (Berlin). Thus, the cones are surprisingly light considering their size. The Ezelsdorf example, measuring 89 centimetres (35 in) in height, weighs only 280 grams (9.9 oz).

Because of the tribological characteristics of the material, it tends to harden with increasing deformation (see ductility), increasing its potential to crack. To avoid cracking, an extremely even deformation would have been necessary. Additionally, the material would have had to be softened by repeatedly heating it to a temperature of at least 750 °C (1,380 °F).

Since gold alloy has a relatively low melting point of about 960 °C (1,760 °F), a very careful temperature control and an isothermal heating process would have been required, so as to avoid melting any of the surface. For this, the Bronze Age artisans presumably used a charcoal fire or oven similar to those used for pottery. The temperature could only be controlled through the addition of air, using a bellows.

Considering the tribologic conditions and the technical means available at the time, the production even of an undecorated gold hat would represent an immense technical achievement.

In the course of their further manufacture, the gold hats were embellished with rows of radial ornamental bands, chased into the metal. To make this possible, they were probably filled with a putty or pitch based on tree resin and wax; in the Schifferstadt specimen, traces of this have survived. The thin gold leaf was structured by chasing: stamp-like tools or moulds depicting the individual symbols were repeatedly pressed into (or rolled along) the exterior of the gold. Combs were also used.

== Similar artefacts ==
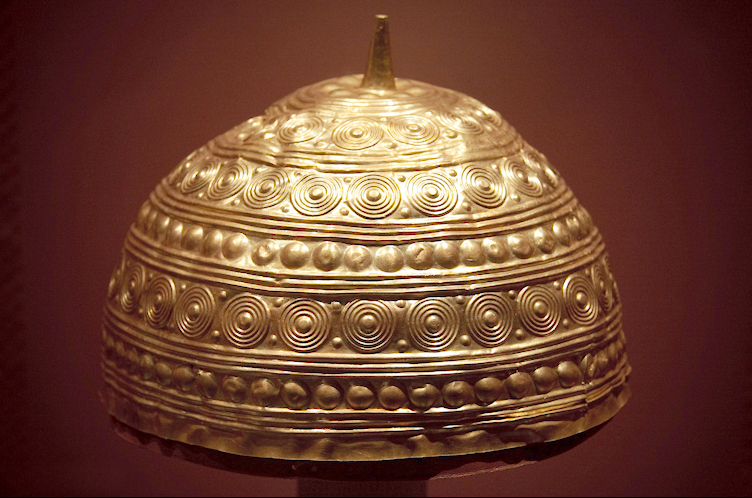
Gold Casco de Leiro, Galicia (Spain), 1400–1300 BC

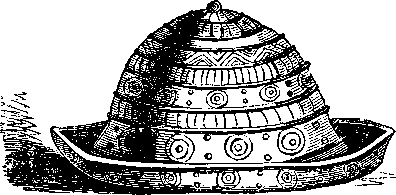
Gold Commerford Crown, Ireland

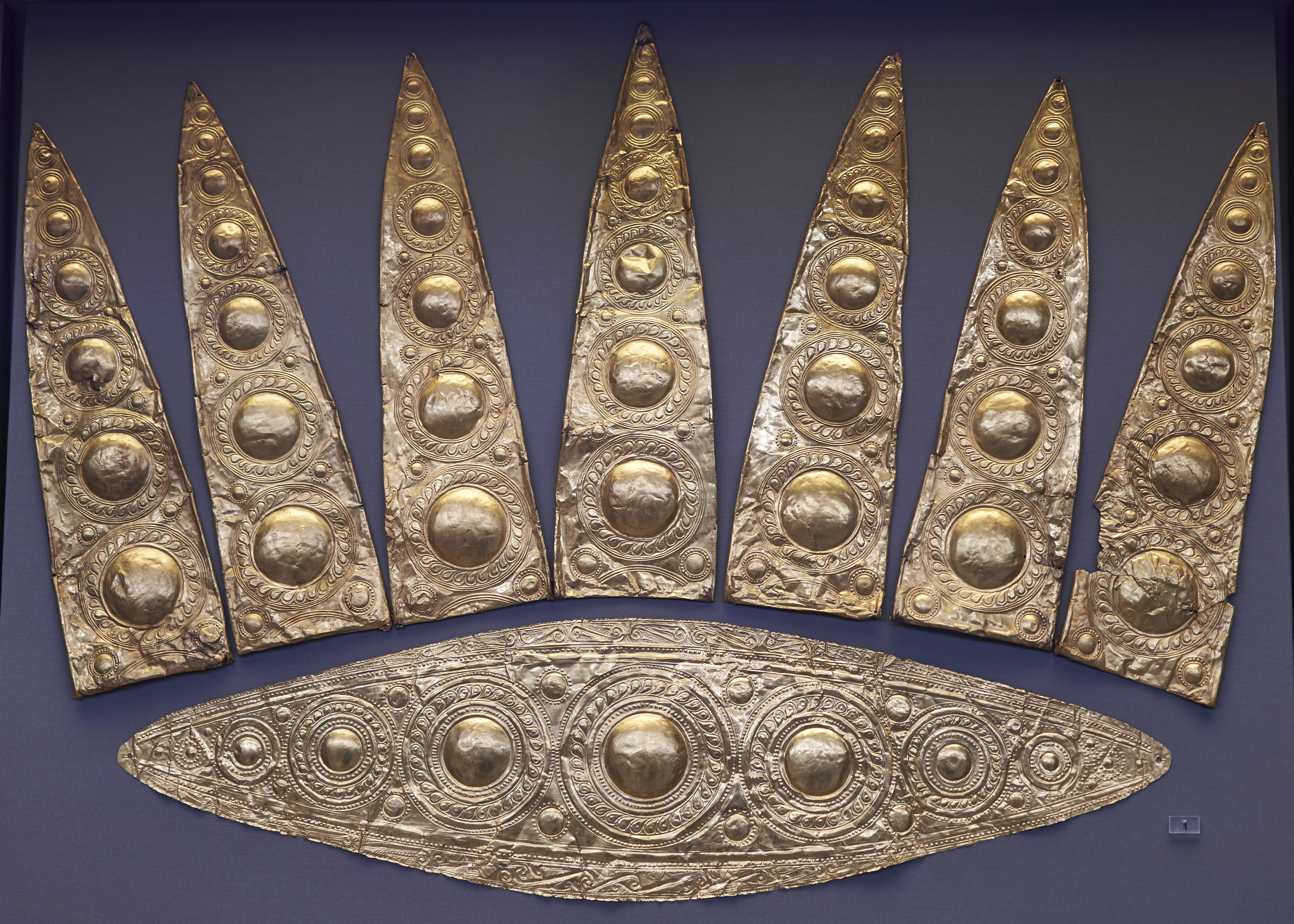
Gold diadem from Mycenae, Greece.

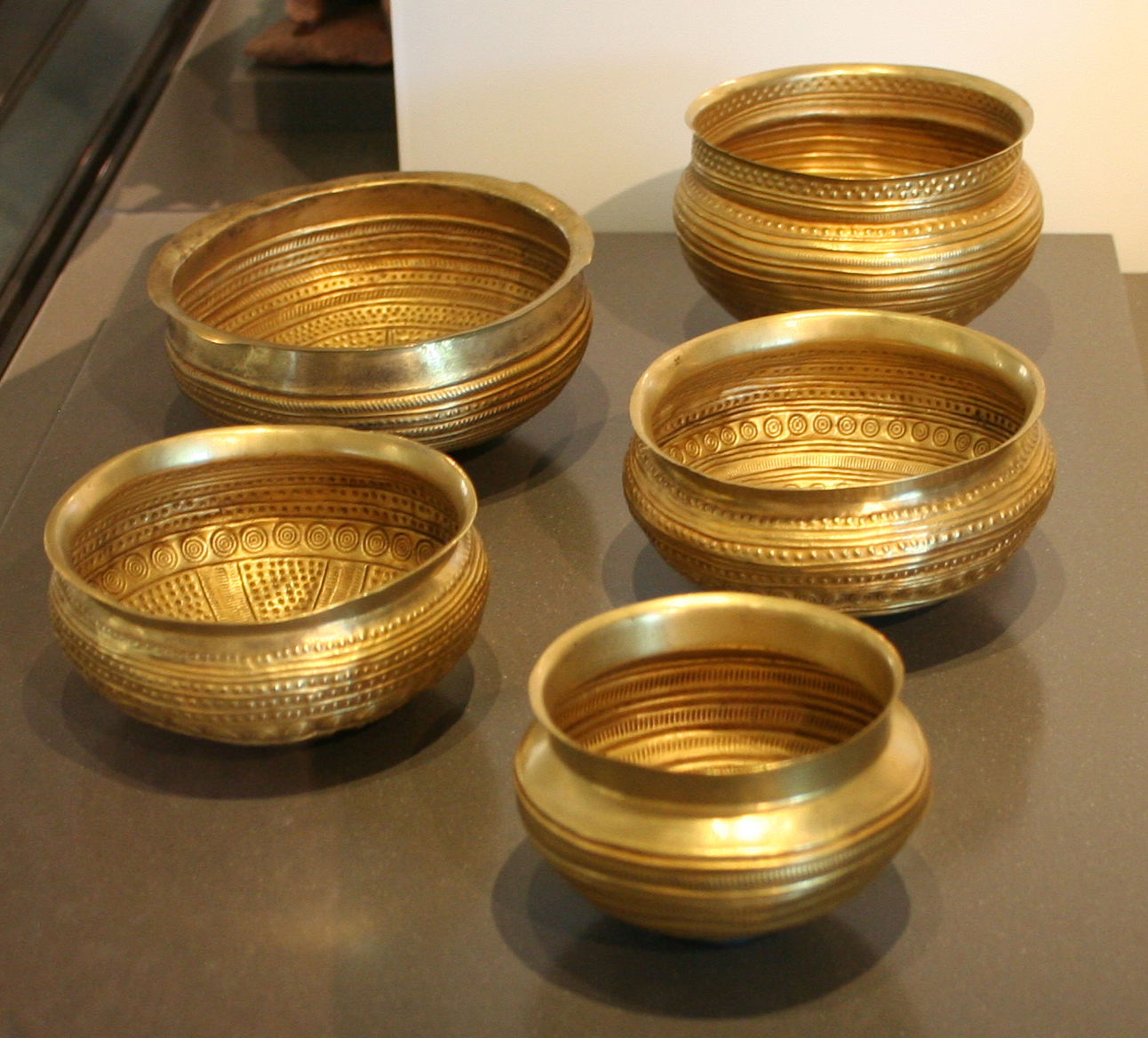
Eberswalde Hoard gold bowls, Germany

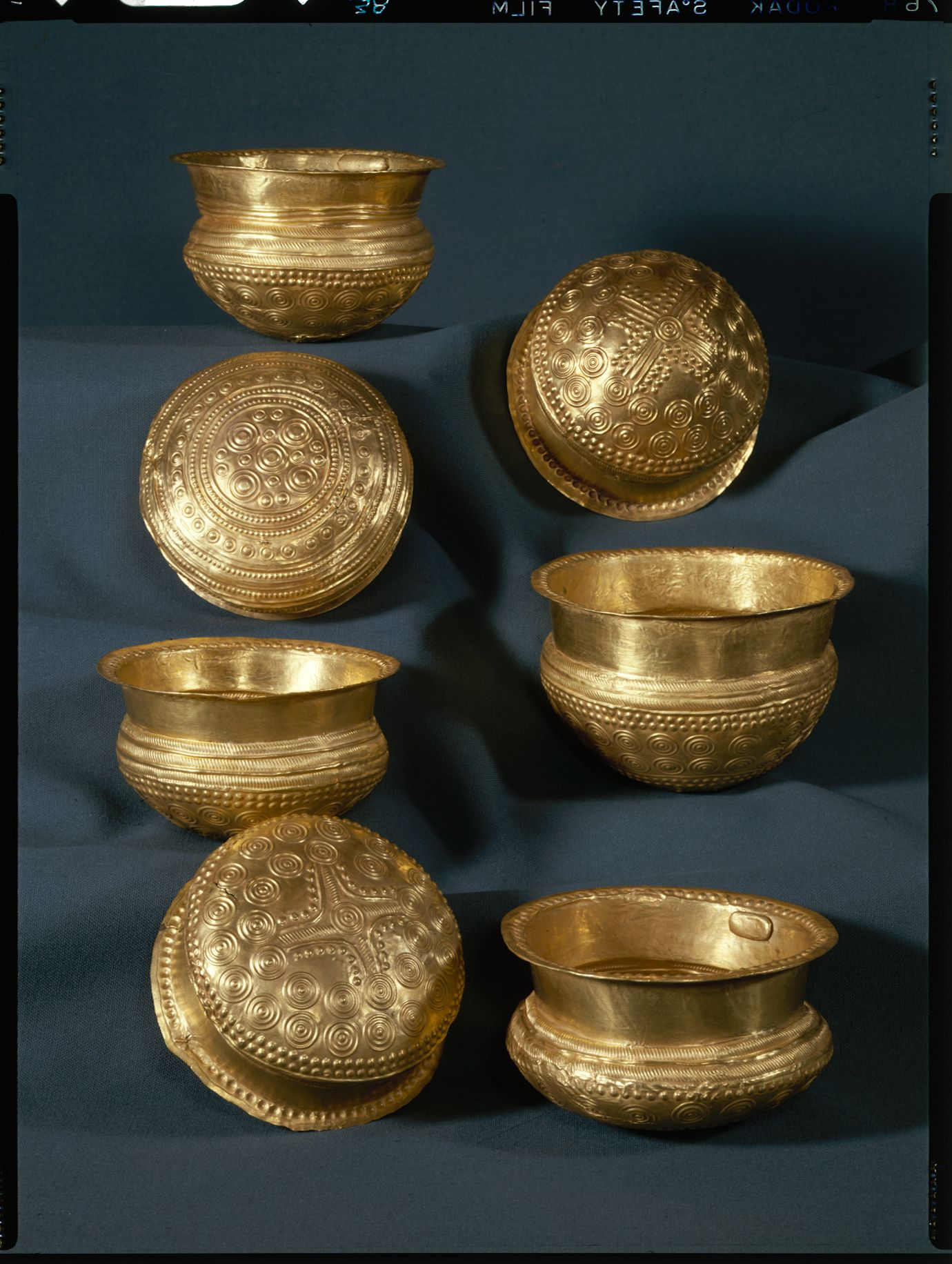
Gold bowls from Midskov, Denmark, c. 1000 BC.

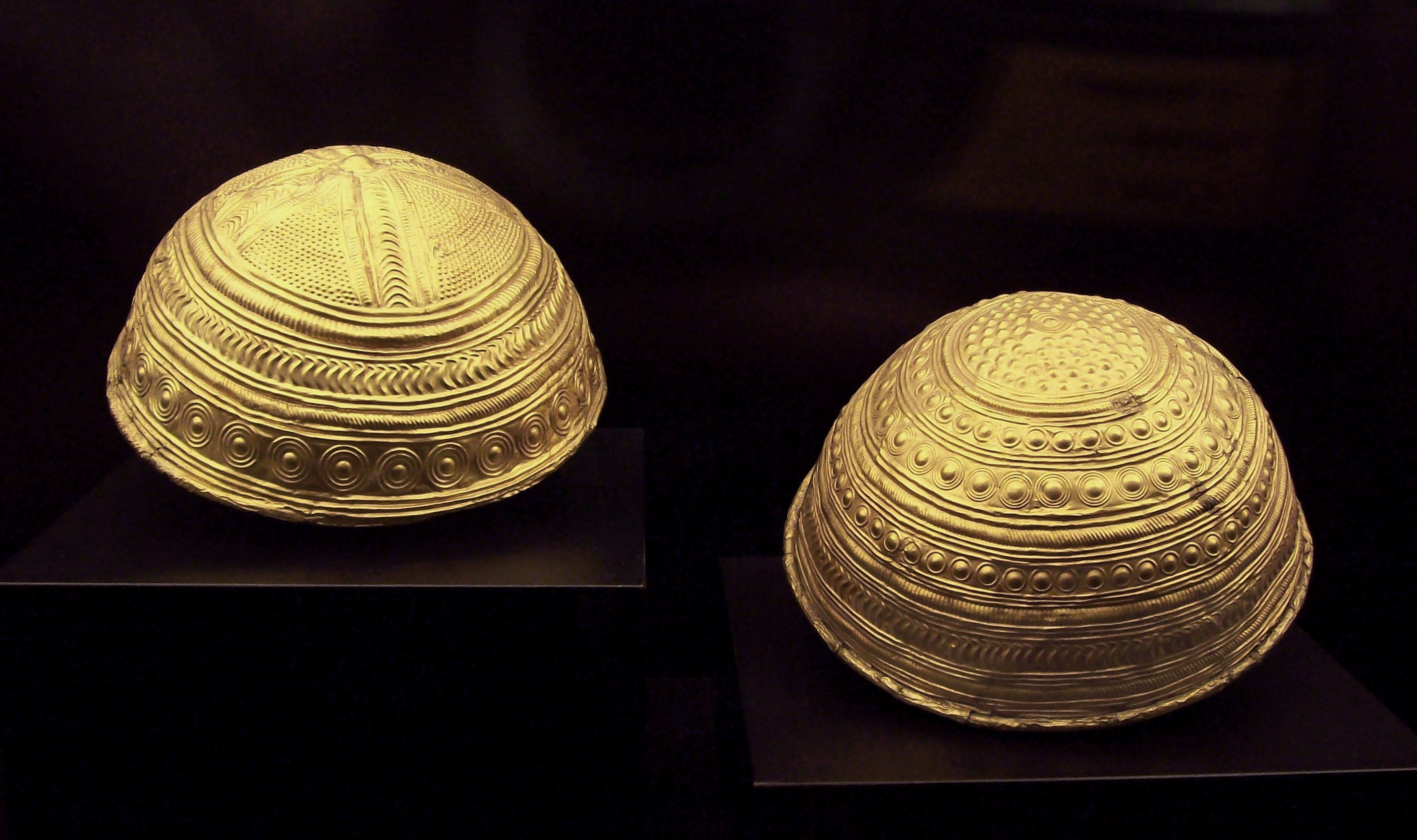
Gold bowls from Axtroki, Basque Country, Spain

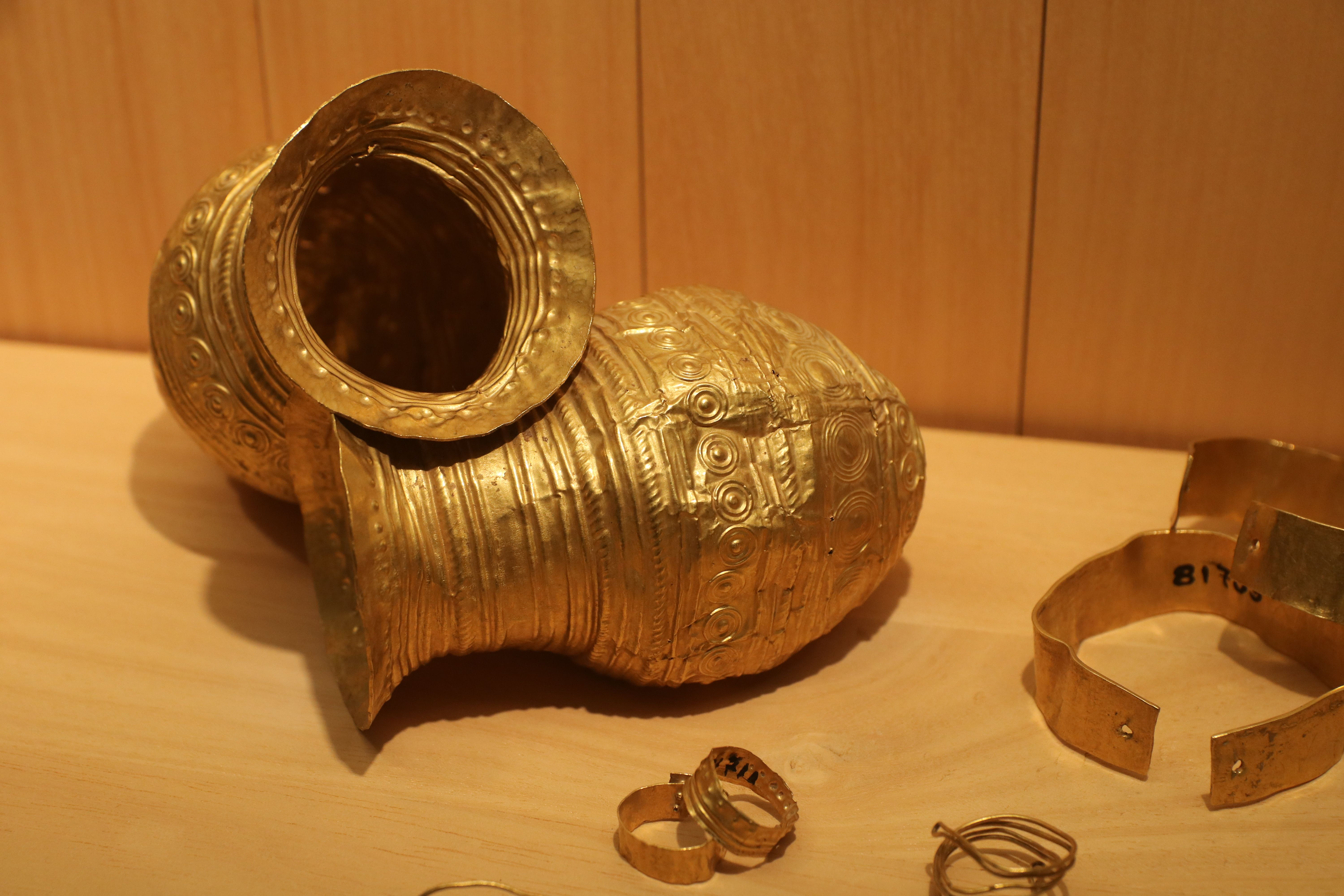
Gold vessels, France, c. 1400 BC

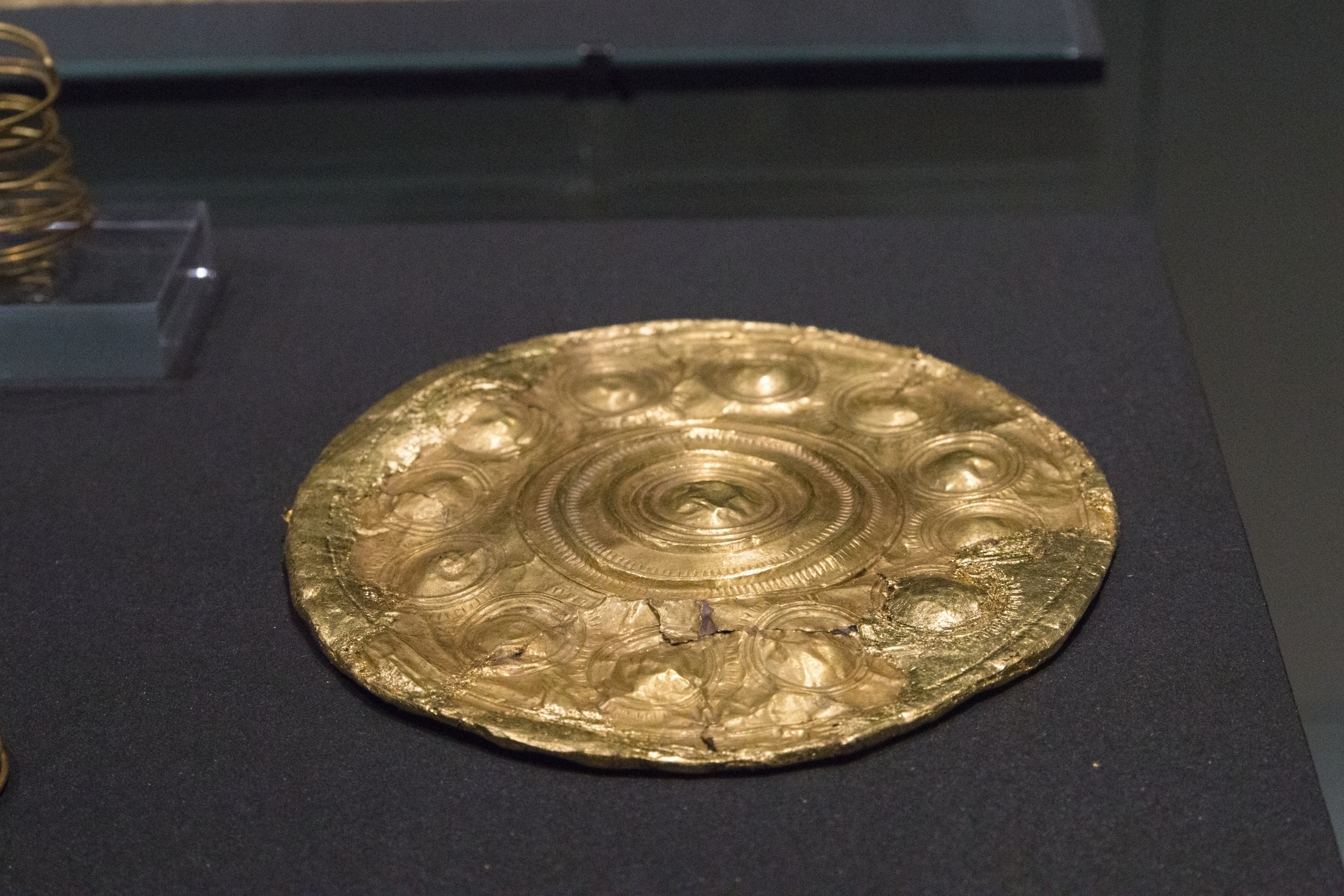
Gold disc, Czech Republic, 1650–1250 BC.

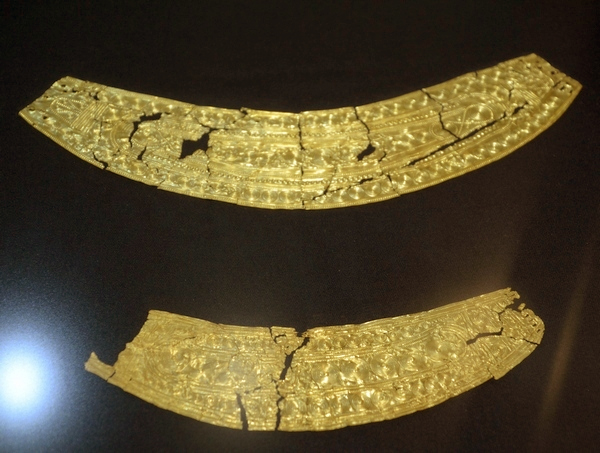
Gold appliqués from Lake Bled, Slovenia, 13th–12th century BC.

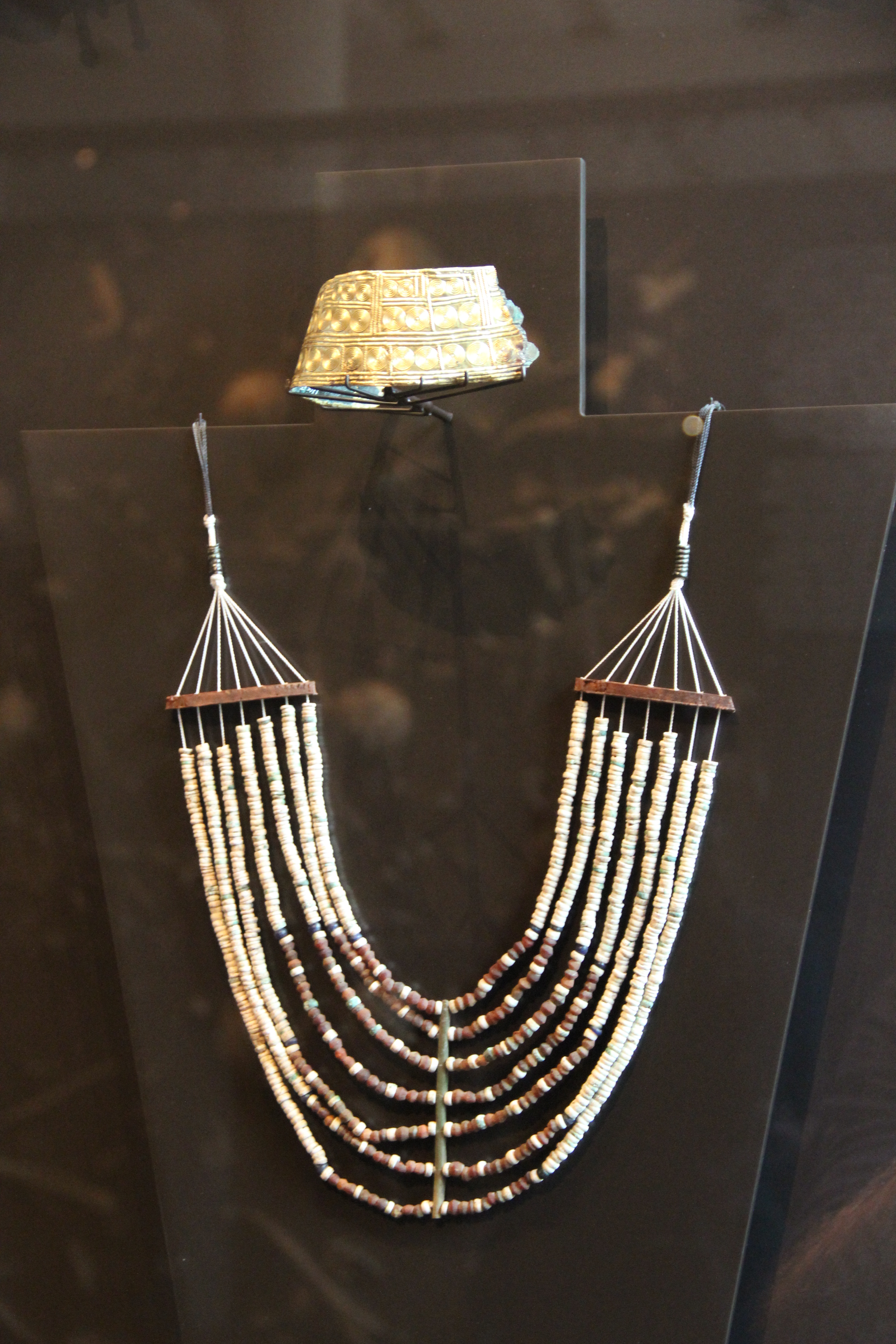
Gold collar from Austria, c. 900 BC.

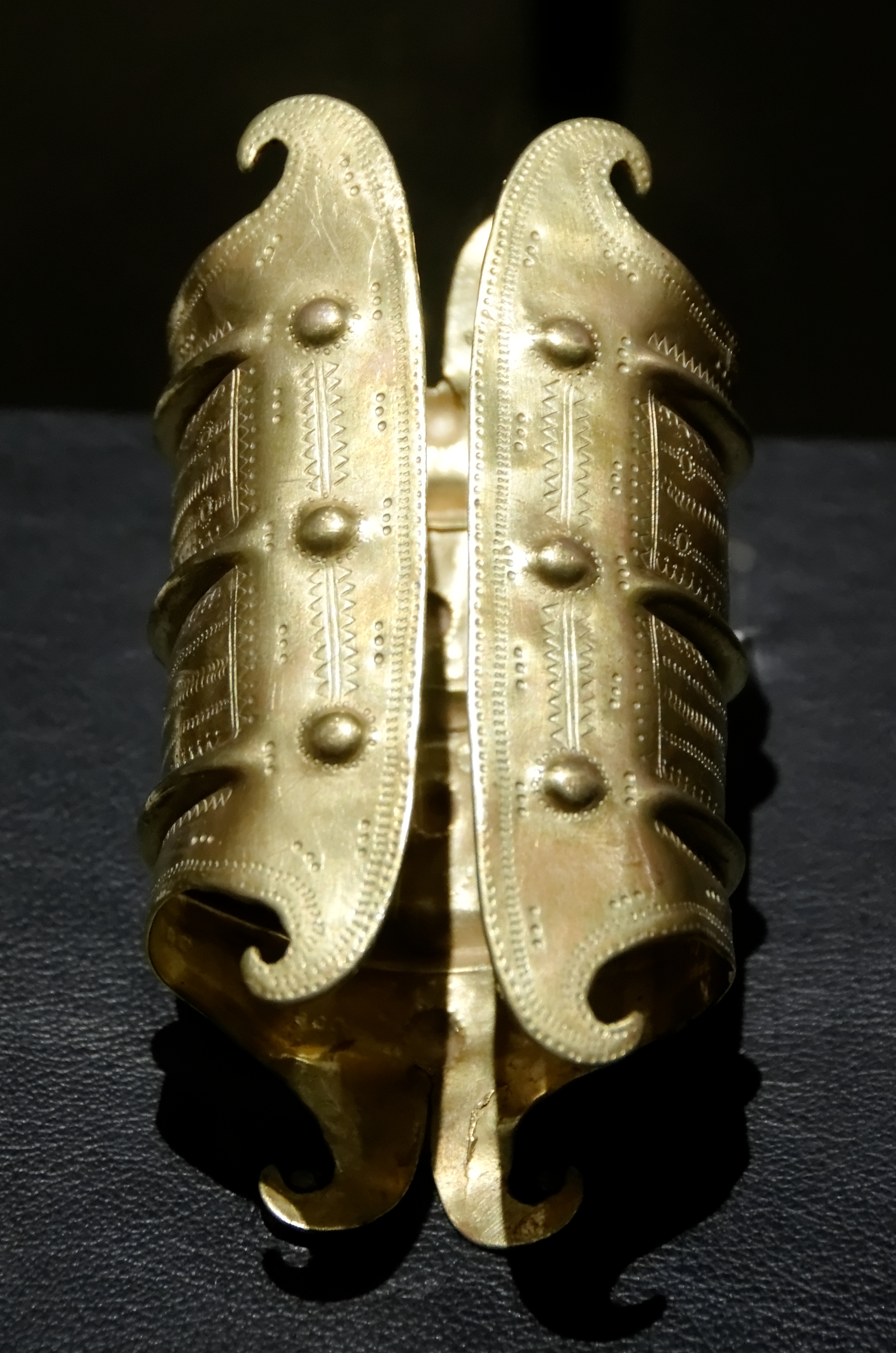
Gold bracelet from Dunavecse, Hungary, c. 1500 BC.

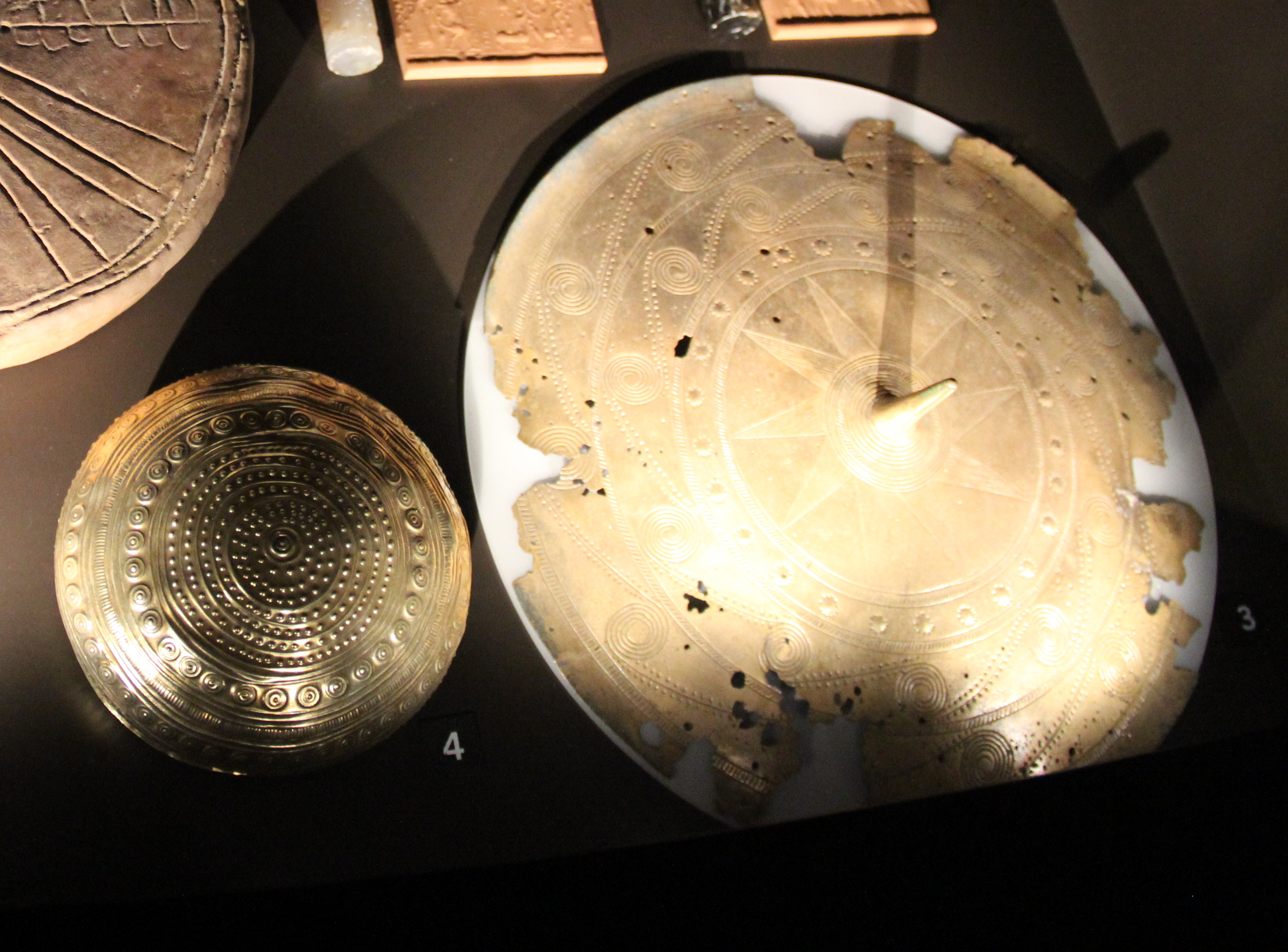
Heegermühle disc and Eberswalde bowl, Germany.

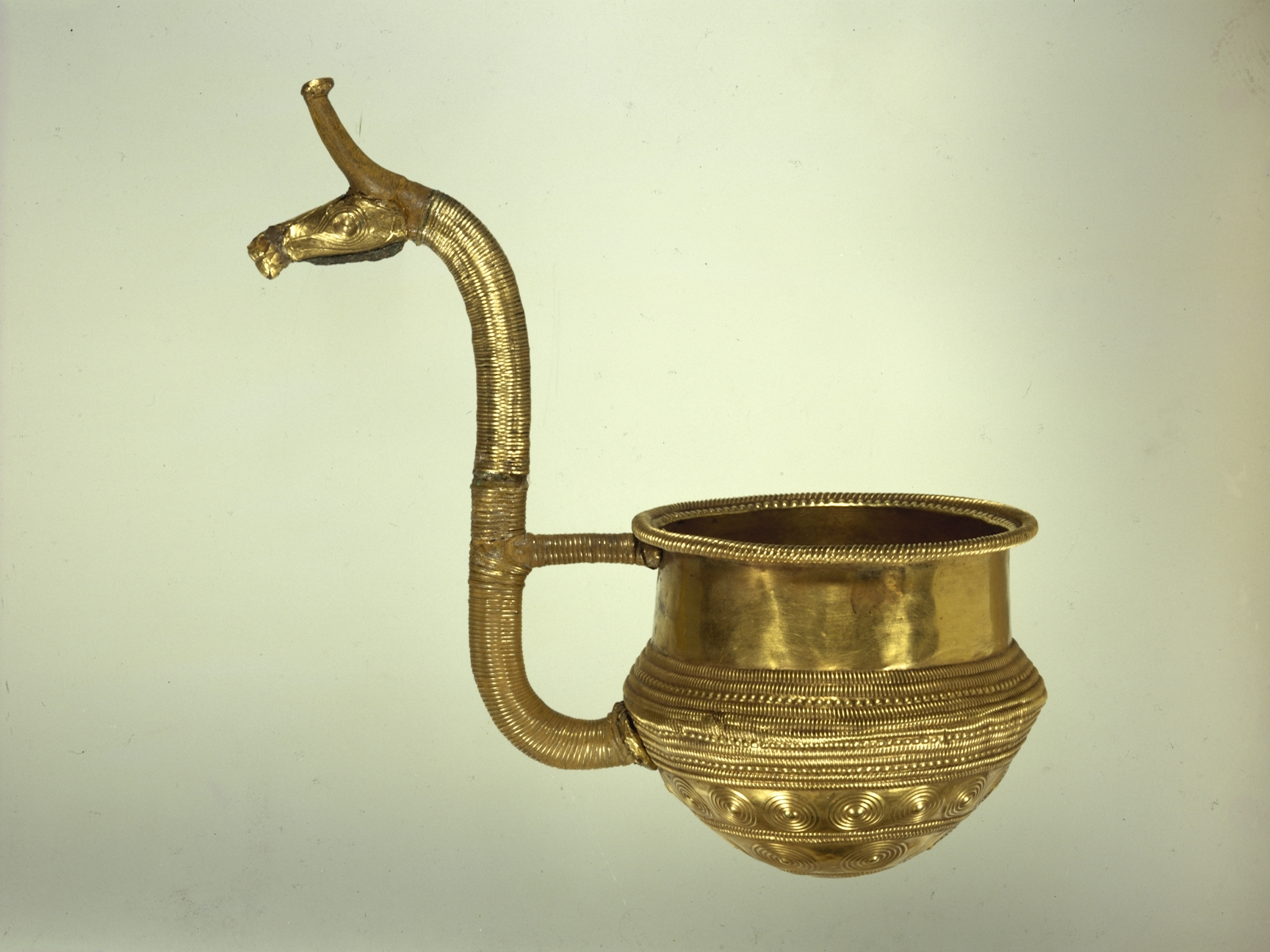
Boeslunde hoard gold bowl, Denmark, 1000-800 BC

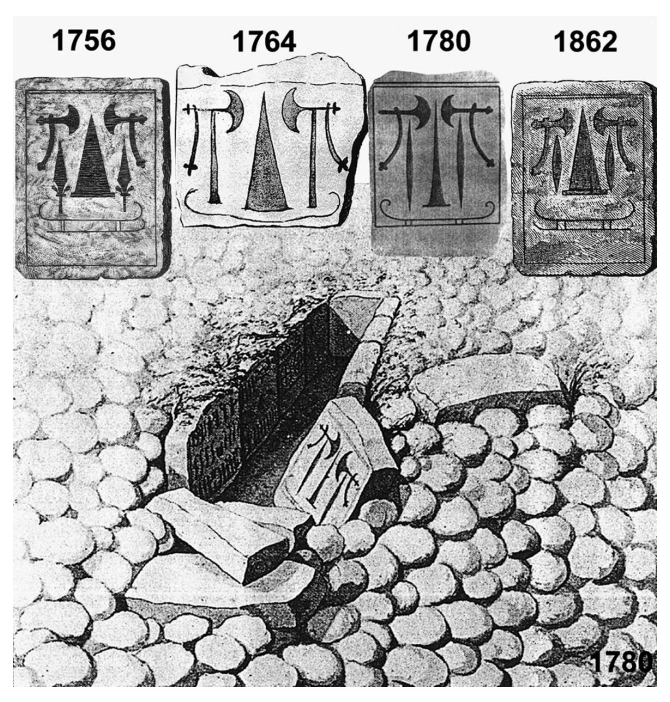
Drawings of one of the petroglyph steles in the Kivik King's Grave, Sweden, c. 1400 BC.

== Exhibitions ==
The gold hats were first brought together for comparison and set in the broader context of the culture of Bronze Age Europe in a 1999 exhibition in Bonn, Gods and heroes of the Bronze Age: Europe in the time of Odysseus. Normally they reside in separate museums, at Berlin (Museum für Vor- und Frühgeschichte), Speyer (Historisches Museum der Pfalz, the Schifferstadt specimen), Nuremberg (Germanisches Nationalmuseum, the Ezelsdorf one), and Saint-Germain-en-Laye (Musée d'Archéologie Nationale).

== See also ==
- List of hats and headgear
- Casco de Leiro – a Bronze Age gold helmet from Galicia, NW Iberia
- Nebra sky disc – another Central European metal object from the Bronze Age expressing advanced knowledge of astronomy, between 1700 and 2100 BC.
- Pointed hat
- Trundholm sun chariot
- Tumulus culture
- Urnfield culture
- Head cone

== Bibliography ==
1. Gold und Kult der Bronzezeit. (Exhibition catalogue). Germanisches Nationalmuseum, Nürnberg 2003. ISBN 3-926982-95-0
2. Wilfried Menghin (ed.): Acta Praehistorica et Archaeologica. Unze, Potsdam 32.2000, p. 31-108. ISSN 0341-1184
3. Peter Schauer: Die Goldblechkegel der Bronzezeit – Ein Beitrag zur Kulturverbindung zwischen Orient und Mitteleuropa. Habelt, Bonn 1986. ISBN 3-7749-2238-1
4. Gerhard Bott (ed.): Der Goldblechkegel von Ezelsdorf. (Exhibition cat.). Theiß, Stuttgart 1983. ISBN 3-8062-0390-3
5. Mark Schmidt: Von Hüten, Kegeln und Kalendern oder Das blendende Licht des Orients. in: Ethnographisch-Archäologische Zeitschrift. Berlin 43.2002, p. 499-541. ISSN 0012-7477
6. Werner Schröter, Karl-Friedrich Lebkücher, Alexander Koch (ed.), Lothar Sperber: Der Goldene Hut von Schifferstadt (Museum Book), Historisches Museum der Pfalz Speyer, Speyer 2008
