= Comerford Crown =

Bronze Age ritual gold hat

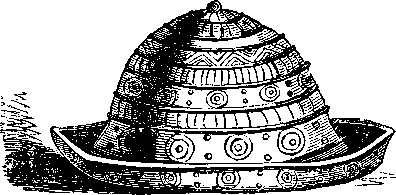
Comerford Crown, picture from: Dublin Penny Journal, Vol. 1, No. 9, August 25, 1832

The Comerford Crown or Ikerrin Crown is the name of a lost archaeological relic probably dating from the Bronze Age that was in the possession of the noble Comerford Family from its discovery in 1692 in Ireland, later removal from Ireland, and possibly lost by that family while living in exile in France during the Reign of Terror (c. 1793).

The crown was an encased gold cap or crown that was discovered 10 ft underground, by turf-cutters, at the Devil's Bit, County Tipperary, in 1692. Joseph Comerford bought it and saved it from being melted down. Other similar antiquities (see: Golden hat) have been discovered elsewhere in Europe and have dated from the Bronze Age.

The crown weighed about five troy ounces (156 grams), and may have been melted down for its intrinsic value during the Reign of Terror.

The eventual fate of the crown rescued by Comerford remains a mystery. The crown appears to have survived in safe hands for a long time after his death. In his Histoire d’Irlande (1758), the Abbé MacGeoghegan, described this gold crown as being in the shape of a bonnet, and added: “This curious part of antiquity was sold to Joseph Comerford and must be preserved in the Castle of Anglure, where he had bought the estate.”

Supporting the theory the crown survived the Reign of Terror is a contributor to the Dublin Penny Journal who in August 1832 claimed that the crown was then still preserved in the Château d’Anglure. However, Dr Czernicki, whose father bought the Château d’Anglure in 1832 from Monsieur Tissandier, said: “I never heard anyone speak about the piece of antiquity that you refer to."

It is therefore generally considered to have been lost and probably melted down during the French Revolution.
