= Urnfield culture =

c. 1300–750 BC archaeological culture of Central Europe

- Geographical range: Europe
- Period: Late Bronze Age
- Dates: c. 1300–750 BC
- Major sites: Burgstallkogel (Sulm valley), Ipf (mountain), Ehrenbürg
- Preceded by: Tumulus culture, Vatya culture, Encrusted Pottery culture, Vatin culture, Terramare culture, Apennine culture, Nordic Bronze Age, Noua culture, Ottomány culture
- Followed by: Hallstatt culture, Lusatian culture, Proto-Villanovan culture, Villanovan culture, Canegrate culture, Golasecca culture, Este culture, Luco culture, Iron Age France, Iron Age Britain, Iron Age Iberia, Basarabi culture, Cimmerians, Thracians, Dacians, Iron Age Greece

The Urnfield culture (c. 1300–750 BCE) was a late Bronze Age culture of Central Europe, often divided into several local cultures within a broader Urnfield tradition. The name comes from the custom of cremating the dead and placing their ashes in urns, which were then buried in fields. The first usage of the name occurred in publications over grave sites in southern Germany in the late 19th century. Over much of Europe, the Urnfield culture followed the Tumulus culture and was succeeded by the Hallstatt culture. Some linguists and archaeologists have associated this culture with a pre-Celtic language or Proto-Celtic language family. By the end of the 2nd millennium BC, the Urnfield Tradition had spread through Italy, northwestern Europe, and as far west as the Pyrenees. It is at this time that fortified hilltop settlements and sheet‐bronze metalworking also spread widely across Europe, leading some authorities to equate these changes with the expansion of the Celts. These links are no longer accepted.

== Chronology ==
Central European Bronze Age
Late Bronze Age
Ha B2/3	800–950 BC
Ha B1	950–1050 BC
Ha A2	1050–1100 BC
Ha A1	1100–1200 BC
Bz D	1200–1300 BC
Middle Bronze Age
Bz C2	1300–1400 BC
Bz C1	1400–1500 BC
Bz B	1500–1600 BC
Early Bronze Age
Bz A2	1600–2000 BC
Bz A1	2000–2300 BC

It is believed that in some areas, such as in southwestern Germany, the Urnfield culture was in existence around 1200 BC (beginning of Hallstatt A or Ha A), but the Bronze D Riegsee-phase already contains cremations. As the transition from the Middle Bronze Age to the Urnfield culture was gradual, there are questions regarding how to define it.

The Urnfield culture covers the phases Hallstatt A and B (Ha A and B) in Paul Reinecke's chronological system, not to be confused with the Hallstatt culture (Ha C and D) of the following Iron Age. This corresponds to the Phases Montelius III-IV of the Northern Bronze Age. Whether Reinecke's Bronze D is included varies according to the author and region.

The Urnfield culture is divided into the following sub-phases (based on Müller-Karpe sen.):

	date BC
BzD	1300–1200
Ha A1	1200–1100
Ha A2	1100–1000
HaB1	1000–800
HaB2	900–800
Ha B3	800–750

The existence of the Ha B3-phase is contested, as the material consists of female burials only. As can be seen by the arbitrary 100-year ranges, the dating of the phases is highly schematic. The phases are based on typological changes, which means that they do not have to be strictly contemporaneous across the whole distribution. All in all, more radiocarbon and dendro-dates would be highly desirable.

== Origin ==
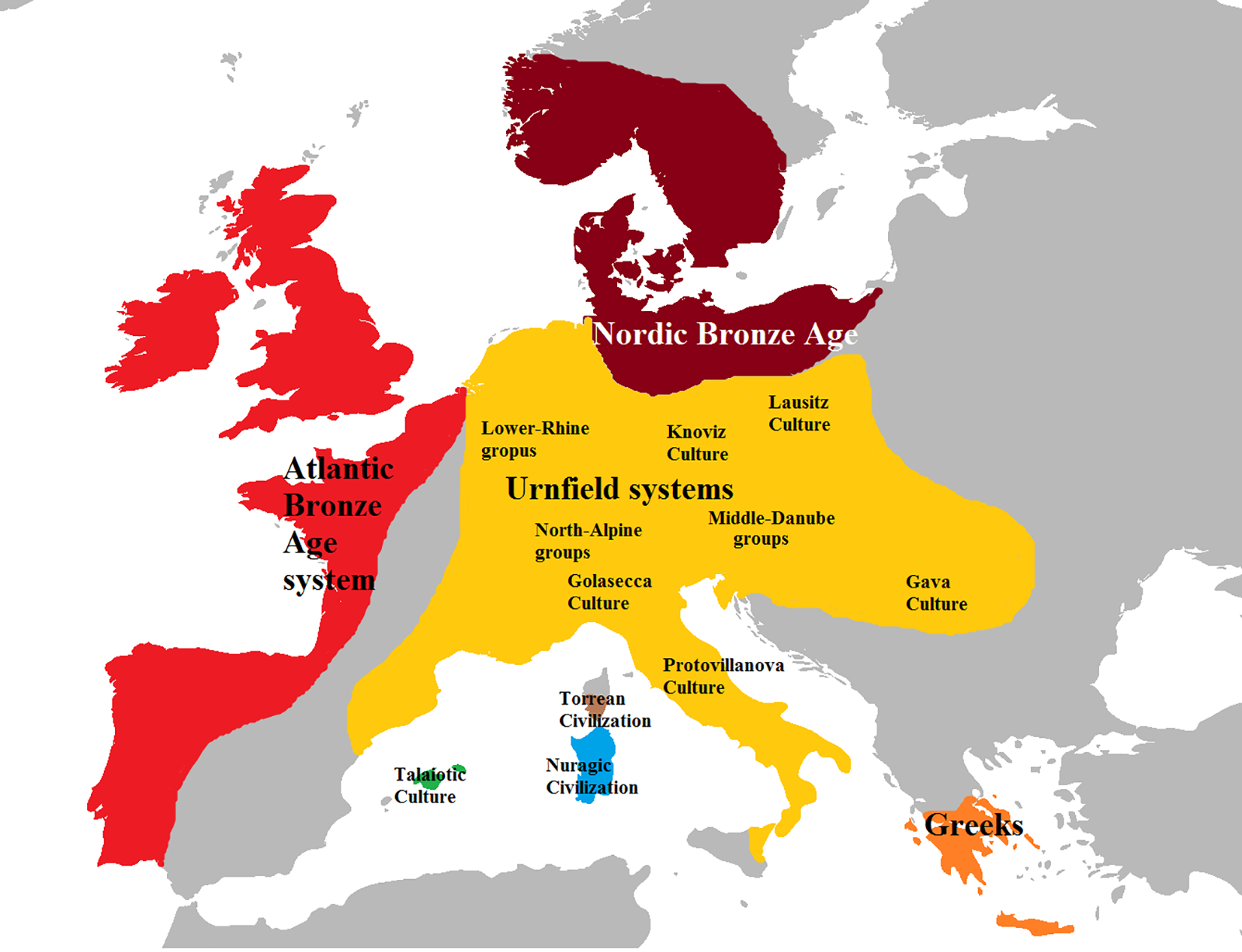
Europe in the late Bronze Age.

The Urnfield culture grew from the preceding Tumulus culture. The transition is gradual, in the pottery as well as the burial rites. In some parts of Germany, cremation and inhumation existed simultaneously (facies Wölfersheim). Some graves contain a combination of Tumulus-culture pottery and Urnfield swords (Kressbronn, Bodenseekreis) or Tumulus culture incised pottery together with early Urnfield types (Mengen). In the North, the Urnfield culture was only adopted in the HaA2 period. 16 pins deposited in a swamp in Ellmoosen (Kr. Bad Aibling, Germany) cover the whole chronological range from Bronze B to the early Urnfield period (Ha A). This demonstrates a considerable ritual continuity. In the Loire, Seine, and Rhône, certain fords contain deposits from the late Neolithic onward up to the Urnfield period.

The cremation rite is commonly believed to have originated in Hungary, where it was widespread since the first half of the second millennium BC. The neolithic Cucuteni–Trypillia culture of modern-day northeastern Romania and Ukraine were also practicing cremation rituals as early as approximately 5500 BC. Some cremations begin to be found in the Proto-Lusatian and Trzciniec culture.

== Distribution and local groups ==
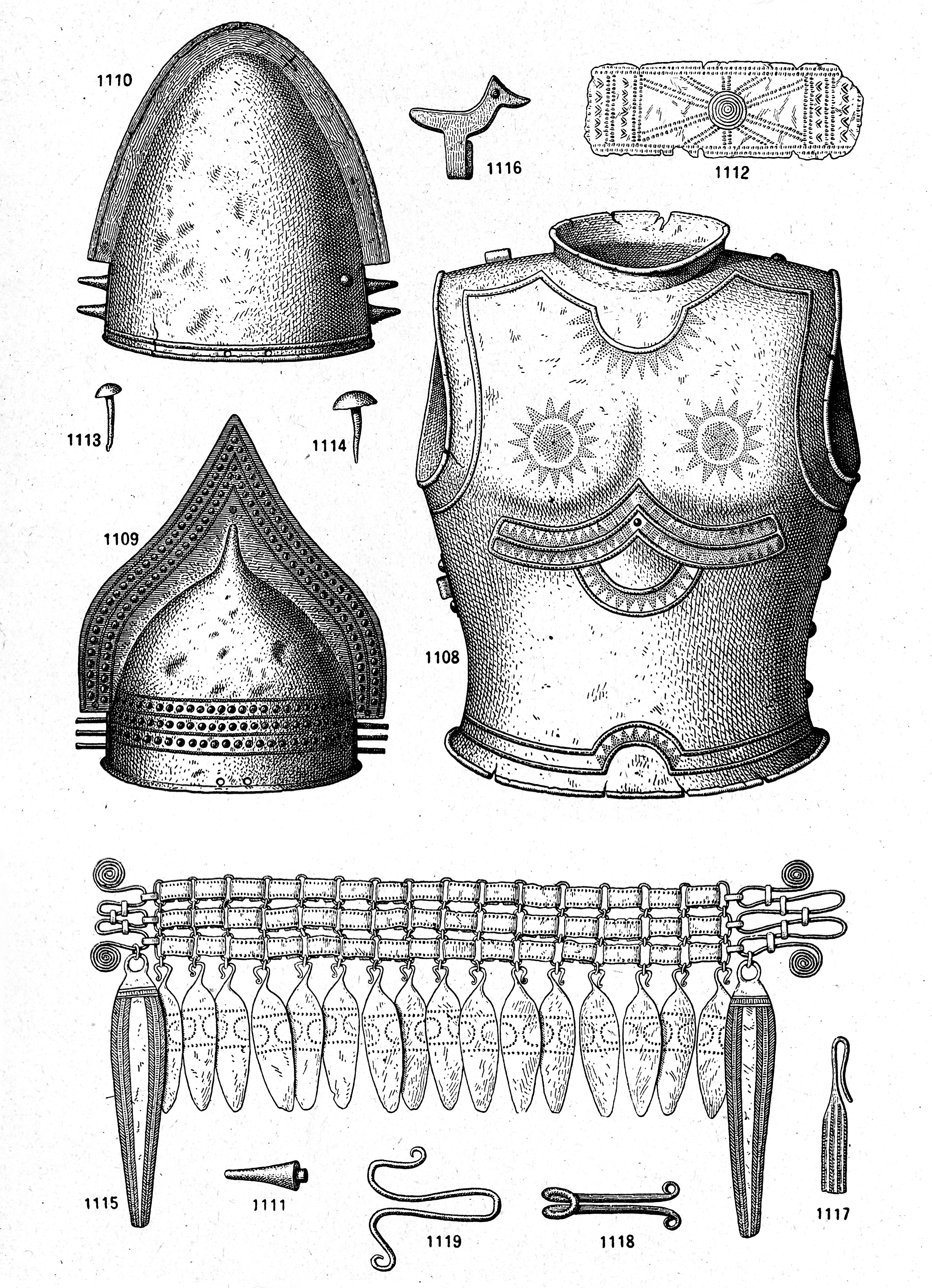
Urnfield culture bronze cuirasse, helmets and ornaments

The Urnfield culture was located in an area stretching from western Hungary to eastern France, from the Alps to near the North Sea. Local groups, mainly differentiated by pottery, include:

South-German Urnfield culture

- Northeast-Bavarian Group, divided into a lower Bavarian and an upper Palatinate group
- Lower-Main-Swabian group in southern Hesse and Baden-Württemberg, including the Marburger, Hanauer, lower Main and Friedberger facies
- Rhenish-Swiss group in Rhineland-Palatinate, Switzerland and eastern France, (abbreviated RSFO in French)

Lower-Rhine Urnfield culture

- Lower Hessian Group
- North-Netherlands-Westphalian group
- Northwest-Group in the Dutch Delta region

Middle-Danube Urnfield culture

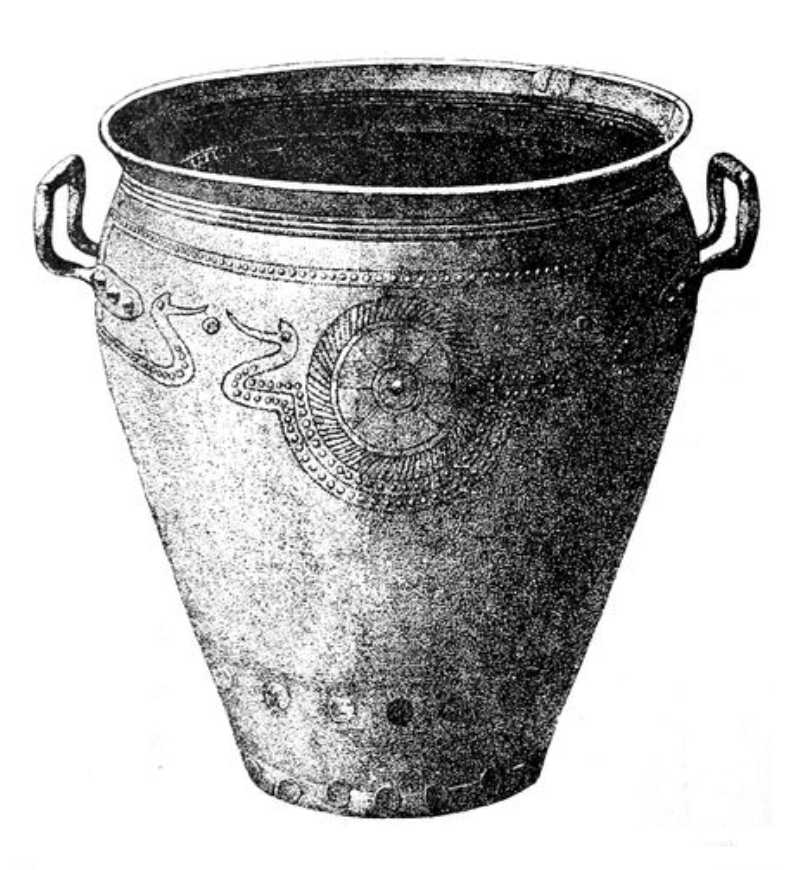
Urnfield culture, bronze situla with bird-headed sun ship motif, Hungary, c. 1000 BC.

- Velatice-Baierdorf in Moravia and Austria
- Čaka culture in western Slovakia
- Gáva culture
- Belegiš culture
- Piliny culture
- Knovíz culture
- Kyjatice culture
- Milavce culture in southwestern Bohemia
- Unstrut culture in Thuringia
- Virovitica in Slovenia and Croatia
- Lusatian culture in northern Bohemia, Lusatia and Poland

Sometimes the distribution of artifacts belonging to these groups shows sharp and consistent borders, which might indicate some political structures, like tribes. Metalwork is commonly of a much more widespread distribution than pottery and does not conform to these borders. It may have been produced at specialised workshops catering for the elite of a large area.

Important French cemeteries include Châtenay and Lingolsheim (Alsace). An unusual earthwork was constructed at Goloring near Koblenz in Germany.

== Related cultures ==
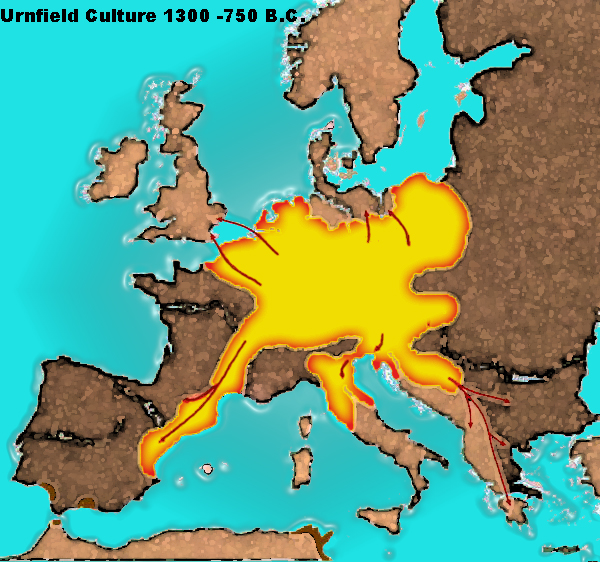
Urnfield-related migrations

The central European Lusatian culture forms part of the Urnfield tradition, but continues into the Iron Age without a notable break.

The Piliny culture in northern Hungary and Slovakia grew from the Tumulus culture, but used urn burials as well. The pottery shows strong links to the Gáva culture, but in the later phases, a strong influence of the Lusatian culture is found.

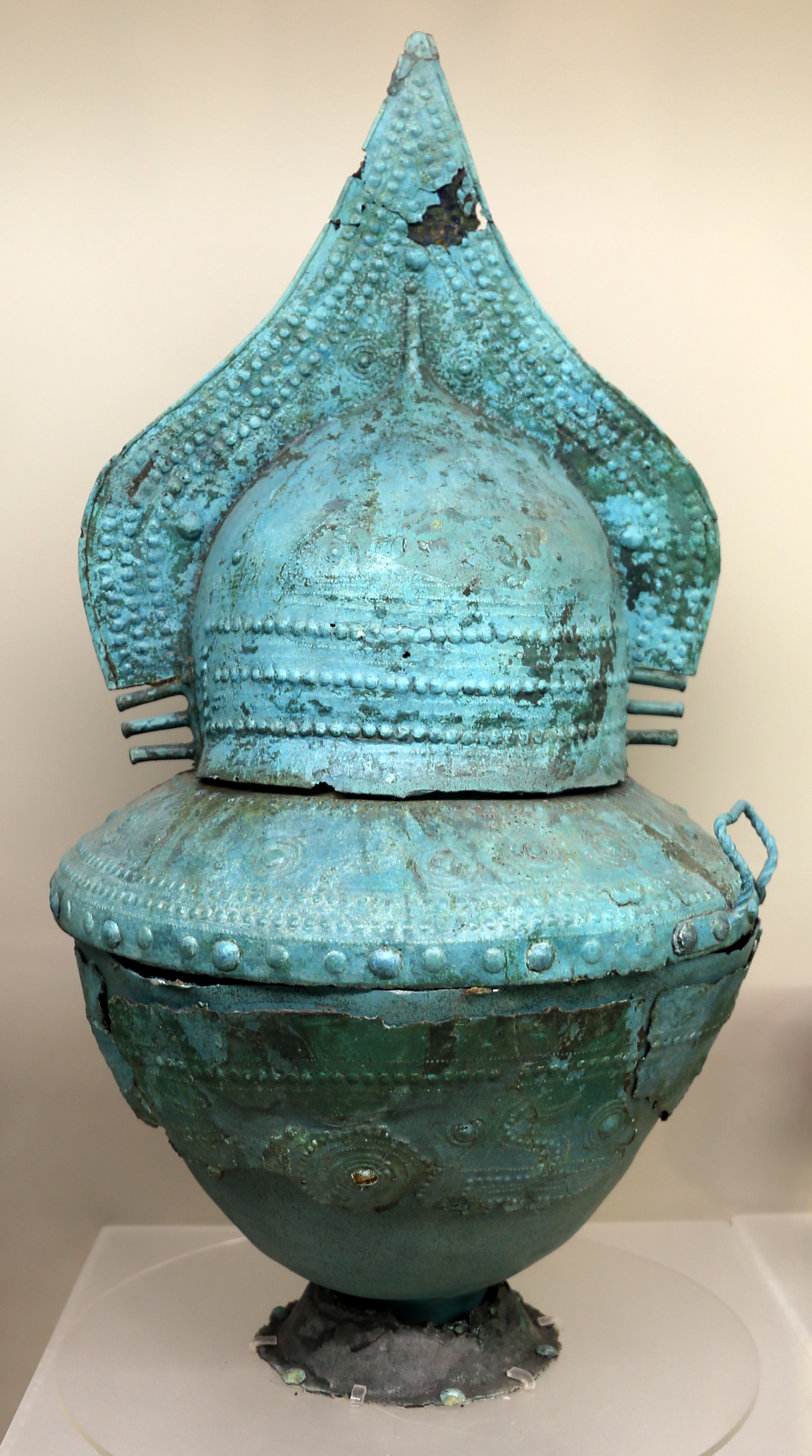
Villanovan cinerary urn with sun-bird-ship motifs, Italy, 8th century BC.

In Italy, the late Bronze Age Canegrate and Proto-Villanovan cultures and the early Iron Age Villanovan culture show similarities with the urnfields of central Europe. The Italic peoples are descended from the Urnfield and Tumulus culture, who inhabited Italy from at least the second millennium BC onwards. Latins achieved a dominant position among these tribes, establishing the ancient Roman civilization. During this development, other Italic tribes adopted the Latin language and culture in a process known as Romanization.

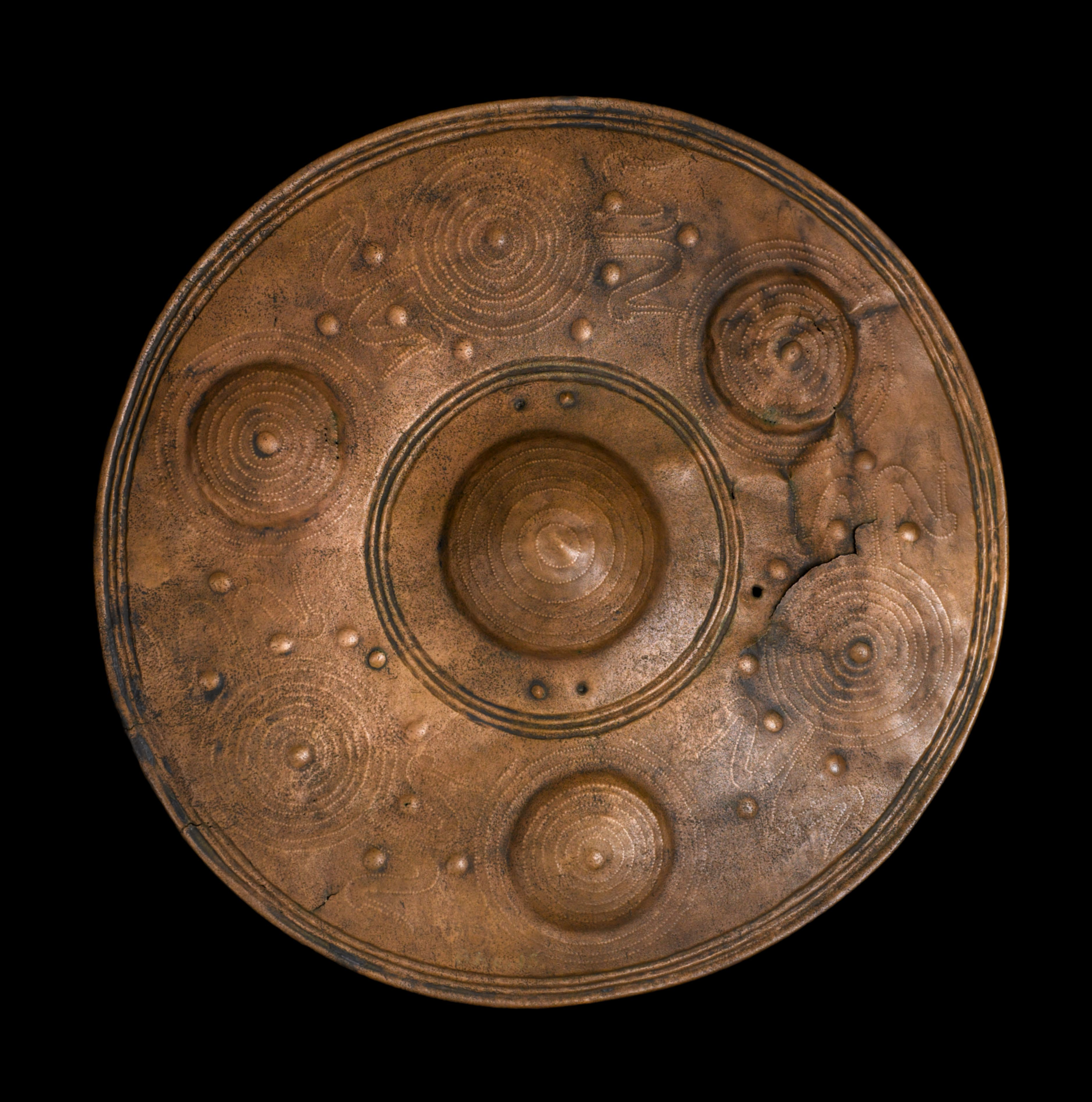
Bronze shield from Denmark with sun-bird-ship motifs, Nordic Bronze Age, c. 1100-700 BC.

Urnfields are found in the French Languedoc and Catalonia from the 9th to 8th centuries. The change in burial customs was most probably influenced by developments further east.

Evidence for an association between the Urnfield culture and a hypothetical Italo-Celtic language group has been discussed by scholars such as Peter Schrijver.

Placename evidence has also been used to point to an association of the Urnfield materials with the Proto-Celtic language group in central Europe, and it has been argued that it was the ancestral culture of the Celts. The Urnfield layers of the Hallstatt culture, "Ha A" and "Ha B", are succeeded by the Iron Age "Hallstatt period" proper: "Ha C" and "Ha D" (8th-6th centuries BC), associated with the early Celts; "Ha D" is in turn succeeded by the La Tène culture, the archaeological culture associated with the Continental Celts of antiquity.

The Golasecca culture in northern Italy developed with continuity from the Canegrate culture. Canegrate represented a completely new cultural dynamic to the area expressed in pottery and bronzework, making it a typical western example of the Urnfield culture, in particular the Rhine-Switzerland-Eastern France (RSFO) Urnfield culture. The Lepontic Celtic language inscriptions of the area show the language of the Golasecca culture was clearly Celtic, making it probable that the 13th-century BC language of at least the RSEF area of the western urnfields was also Celtic or a precursor to it.

The influence of the Urnfield culture spread widely and found its way to the northeastern Iberian coast, where the nearby Celtiberians of the interior adapted it for use in their cemeteries. Evidence for east-to-west early Urnfield (Bronze D-Hallstatt A) elite contacts such as rilled-ware, swords and crested helmets has been found in the southwest of the Iberian peninsula. The appearance of such elite status markers provides the simplest explanation for the spread of Celtic languages in this area from prestigious, proto-Celtic, early-Urnfield metalworkers.

== Migrations ==
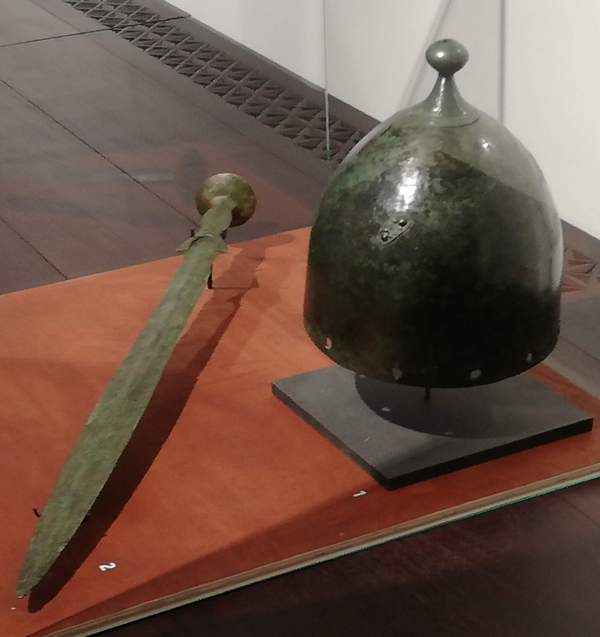
Urnfield culture sword and helmet, Romania

The numerous hoards of the Urnfield culture and the existence of fortified settlements (hill forts) were taken as evidence for widespread warfare and upheaval by some scholars.

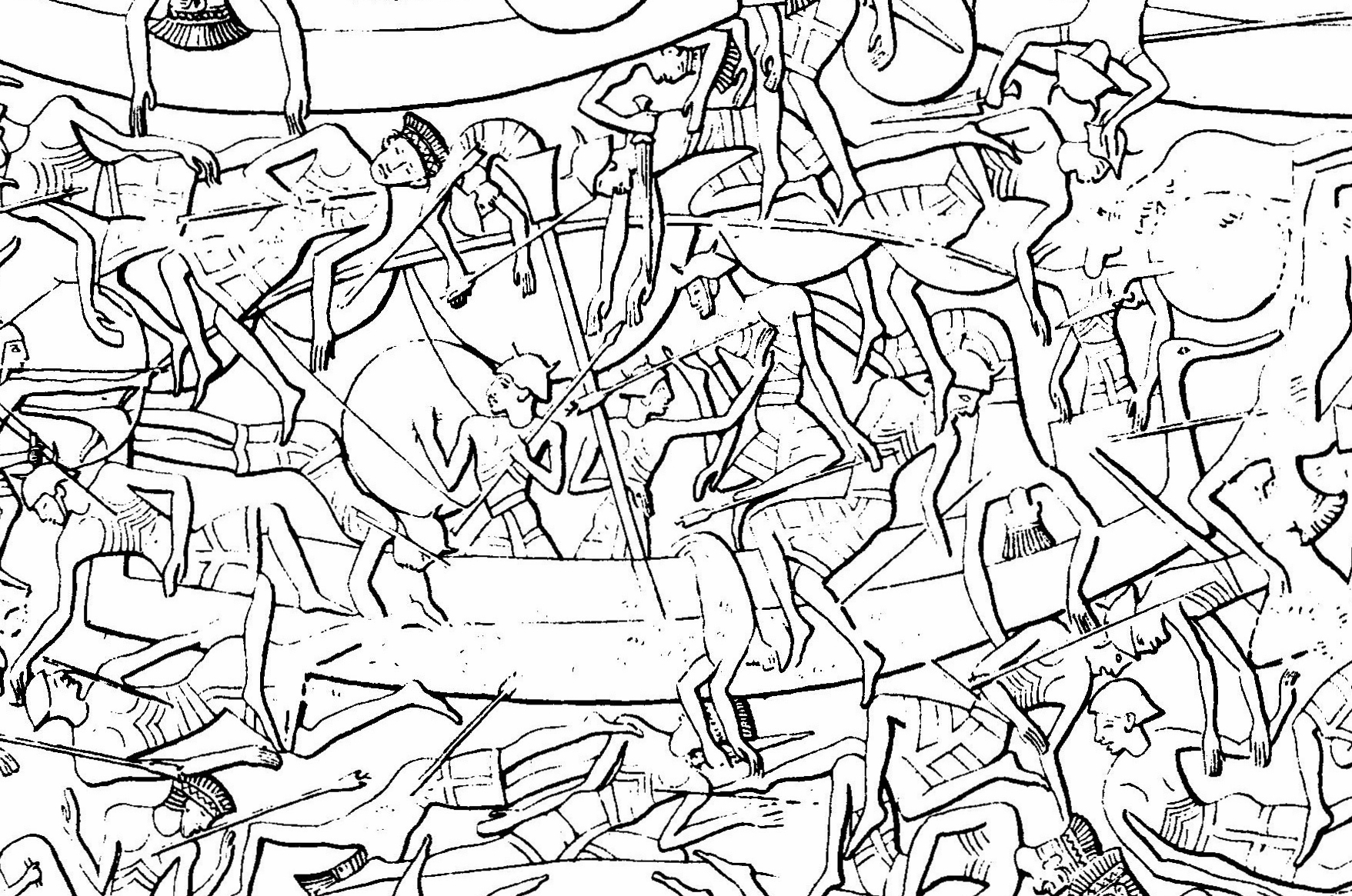
Depiction of the Sea Peoples with bird-headed ship. Medinet Habu, Egypt.

Written sources describe several collapses and upheavals in the Eastern Mediterranean, Anatolia and the Levant around the time of the Urnfield origins:

- End of the Mycenean culture with a conventional date of c. 1200 BC
- Destruction of Troy VI c. 1200 BC
- Battles of Ramses III against the Sea Peoples, 1195–1190 BC
- End of the Hittite empire 1180 BC
- Settlement of the Philistines in Canaan c. 1170 BC

Some scholars, among them Wolfgang Kimmig and P. Bosch-Gimpera have postulated a Europe-wide wave of migrations. The so-called Dorian invasion of Greece was placed in this context as well (although more recent evidence suggests that the Dorians moved in 1100 BC into a post-Mycenaean vacuum, rather than precipitating the collapse).

== Ethnicity ==
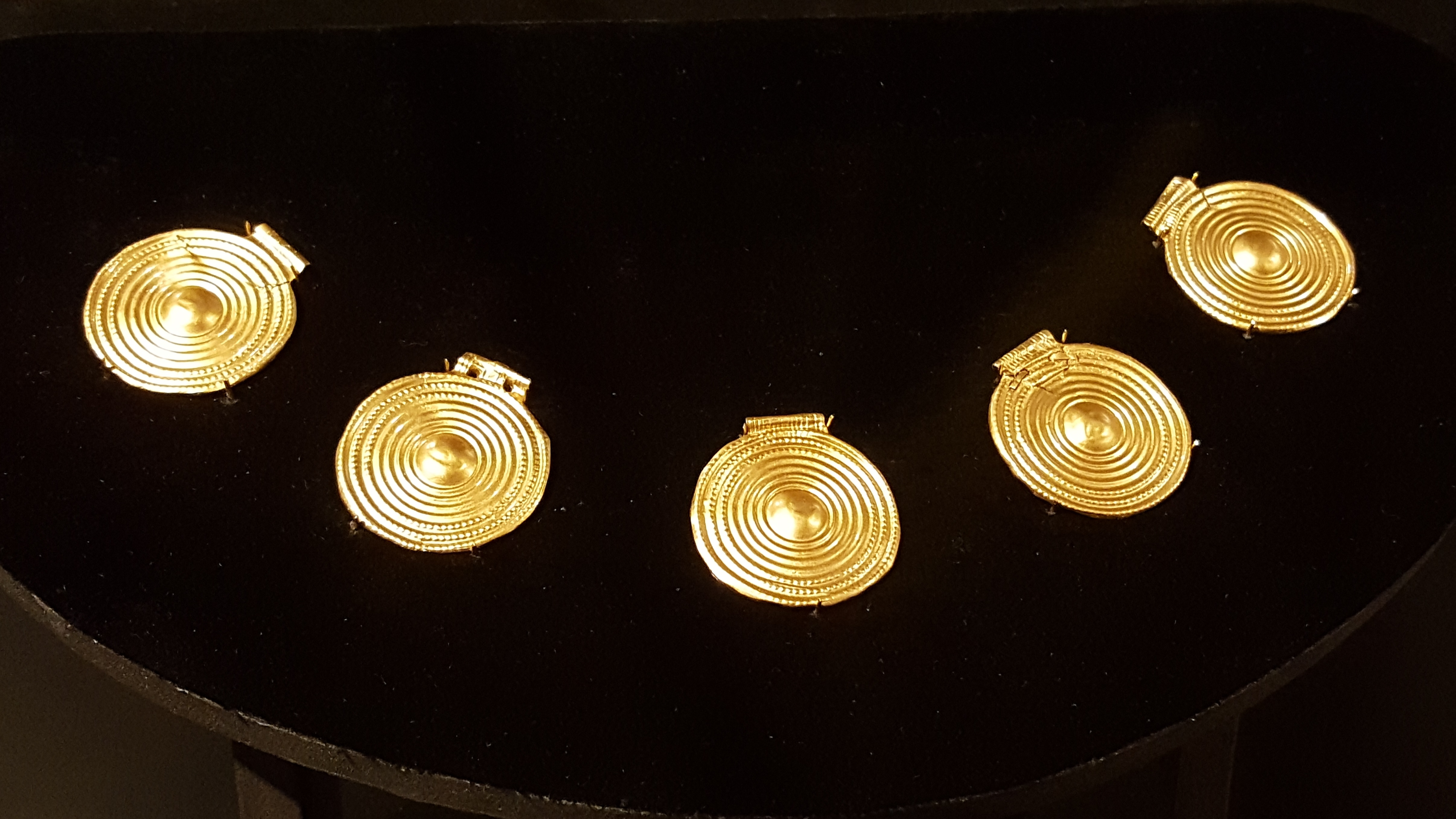
Gold necklace, Belgium, c. 1000 BC

While it is agreed that the Urnfield culture was, at least in part, linguistically Indo-European, the significant variety of regional sub-groups in the material culture is strongly suggestive of ethnic diversity. Marija Gimbutas proposed connections between Urnfield in Central Europe to later ethnolinguistic groups, in other parts of Europe: proto-Celts, proto-Italics, proto-Veneti, proto-Illyrians, proto-Phrygians, proto-Thracians, and proto-Dorians. While it is unclear whether mass migrations out of the Urnfield heartland occurred, they may have taken place during the so-called Bronze Age collapse. During that period, communities in various parts of western and southern Europe introduced the new rite of cremation, new ceramic styles, and the mass production of metal objects, as well as a new religion and Indo-European languages.

== Settlements ==
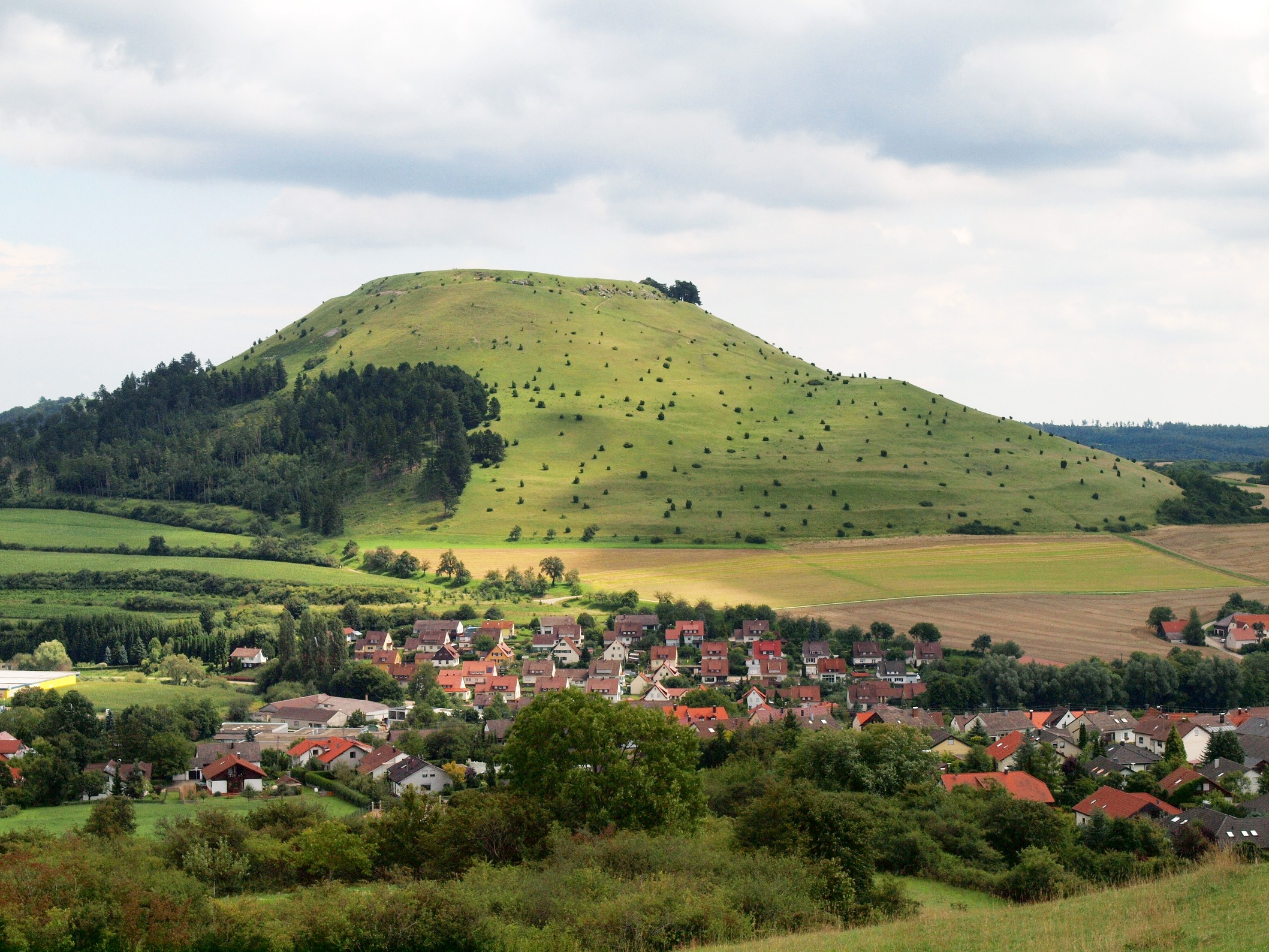
Ipf hillfort, Germany. The summit was levelled and fortified in the Urnfield period.

The number of settlements increased sharply in comparison with the preceding Tumulus culture. Few of them have been comprehensively excavated. Fortified settlements, often on hilltops or in river-bends, are typical for the Urnfield culture. They are heavily fortified with dry-stone or wooden ramparts. Excavations of open settlements are rare, but they show that large 3-4 aisled houses built with wooden posts and wall of wattle and daub were common. Pit dwellings are known as well; they might have served as cellars.

=== Fortified settlements ===
Model of fortifications on the Bullenheimer Berg, Germany.

Fortified hilltop settlements became common in the Urnfield period. Often, a steep spur was used, where only part of the circumference had to be fortified. Depending on the locally available materials, dry-stone walls, gridded timbers filled with stones or soil, or plank and palisade type pfostenschlitzmauer fortifications were used. Other fortified settlements used river-bends and swampy areas.

Metalworking is concentrated in the fortified settlements. On the Runder Berg near Urach, Germany, 25 stone moulds have been found.

Hillforts are interpreted as central places. Some scholars see the emergence of hill forts as a sign of increased warfare. Most hillforts were abandoned at the end of the Bronze Age.

Examples of fortified settlements include Bullenheimer Berg, Ehrenbürg, Hünenburg bei Watenstedt, Heunischenburg, Hesselberg, Bürgstadter Berg, Farrenberg, Gelbe Burg, Heidenschanze and Ipf in Germany, Burgstallkogel, Thunau am Kamp, Oberleiserberg and Stillfried in Austria, Corent and Gannat in France, Hořovice and Plešivec in the Czech Republic, Biskupin in Poland, Ormož in Slovenia, Corneşti-Iarcuri, Sântana and Teleac in Romania, Gradište Idoš in Serbia, Velem and Csanádpalota–Földvár in Hungary, and Udine in Italy.

The 30.5-hectare plateau of the Bullenheimer Berg in Germany was the site of a "large, walled, city-like fortification" in the later Urnfield period. Excavations have revealed a dense settlement across the whole plateau, including courtyard-type buildings located on artificially raised terraces. The fortified settlement on the Ehrenbürg, also covering about 30 ha and surrounded by a timber and stone wall, was another regional centre and the residence of a regional elite. At the hill fort of Hořovice near Beroun (Czech Republic), 50 ha were surrounded by a stone wall. Most settlements were much smaller, however.

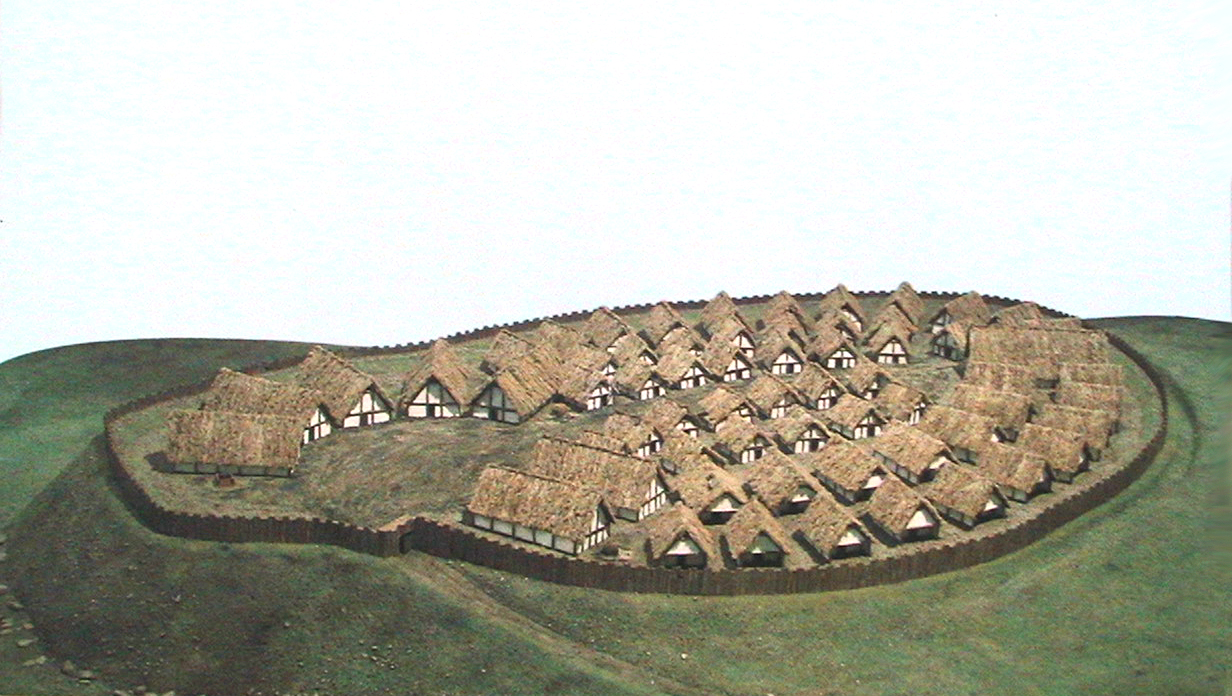
Hühnenburg bei Watenstedt, Germany

Corneşti-Iarcuri in Romania was the largest prehistoric settlement in Europe, at almost 6 km across, with four fortification lines and an inner settlement with a diameter of c. 2 km. Magnetic mapping and excavations have indicated the existence of a well-organised settlement of proto-urban character during the Urnfield period. An estimated 824,00 tonnes of earth had to be moved for the construction of the fortification walls alone. Magnetometric surveys at Sântana have revealed the existence of buildings with lengths exceeding 40 m, including a building approximately 60 m long and 40 m wide.

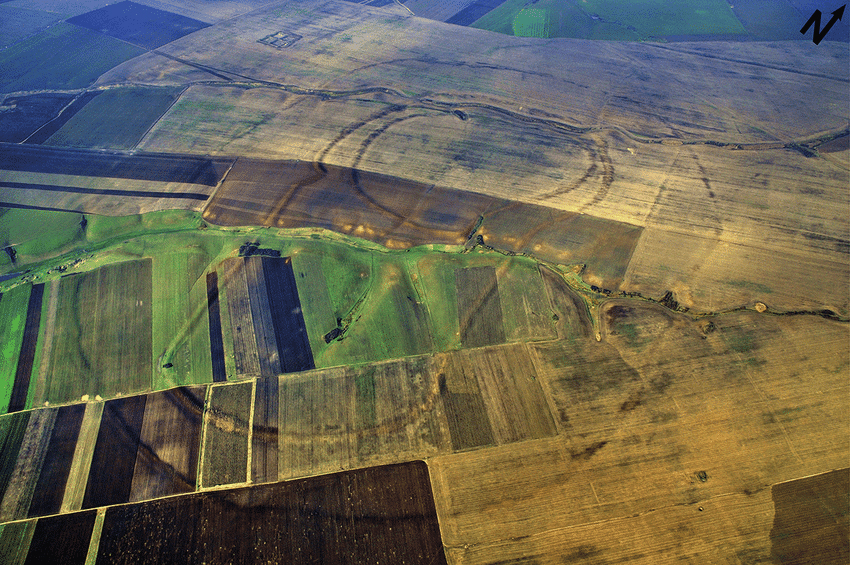
Corneşti-Iarcuri ramparts, Romania

"Mega forts" such as Corneşti-Iarcuri, Sântana and Gradište Idoš were surrounded by numerous smaller settlements, including fortified sites. They formed part of a general movement towards large fortified sites across Europe in the Late Bronze Age, possibly in response to new styles of warfare. The general uniformity in design, material culture, and the density of settlements in Romania and Serbia at this time is indicative of societies that were organized under a common political framework. Kristiansen and Suchowska-Ducke (2015) describe these mega-sites as "part of a political centralisation process, a complex chiefdom, or archaic state".

In 2018, the remains of a Late Bronze Age 'feasting hall' were excavated at the site of Lăpuş in Romania.

=== Open settlements ===
Urnfield period houses were one or two-aisled. Some were quite small, 4.5 m × 5 m at the Runder Berg (Urach, Germany), 5-8m long in Künzig (Bavaria, Germany), others up to 20 m long. They were built with wooden posts and walls of wattle and daub. At the Velatice-settlement of Lovčičky (Moravia, Czech Republic) 44 houses have been excavated. Large bell shaped storage pits are known from the Knovíz culture. The settlement of Radonice (Louny) contained over 100 pits. They were most probably used to store grain and demonstrate a considerable surplus-production.

=== Pile dwellings ===
On lakes of southern Germany and Switzerland, numerous pile dwellings were constructed. They consist either of simple houses made of wattle and daub, or log-built. The settlement at Zug, Switzerland, was destroyed by fire and gives important insights into the material culture and the settlement organisation of this period. It has yielded a number of dendro-dates as well.

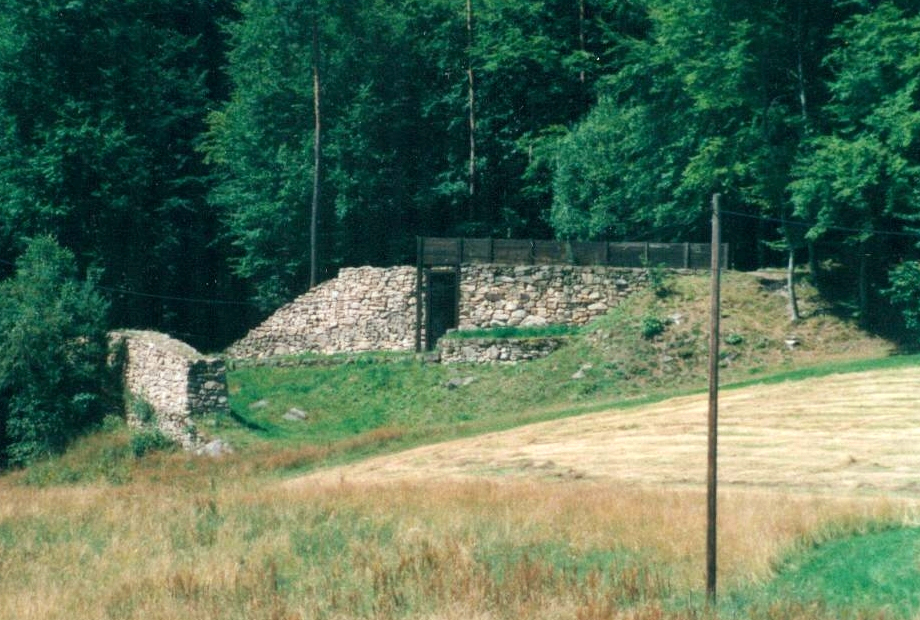
Heunischenburg fortifications, Germany

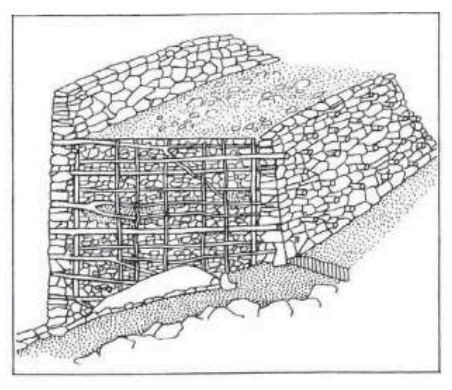
Stone fortification wall, reconstruction.

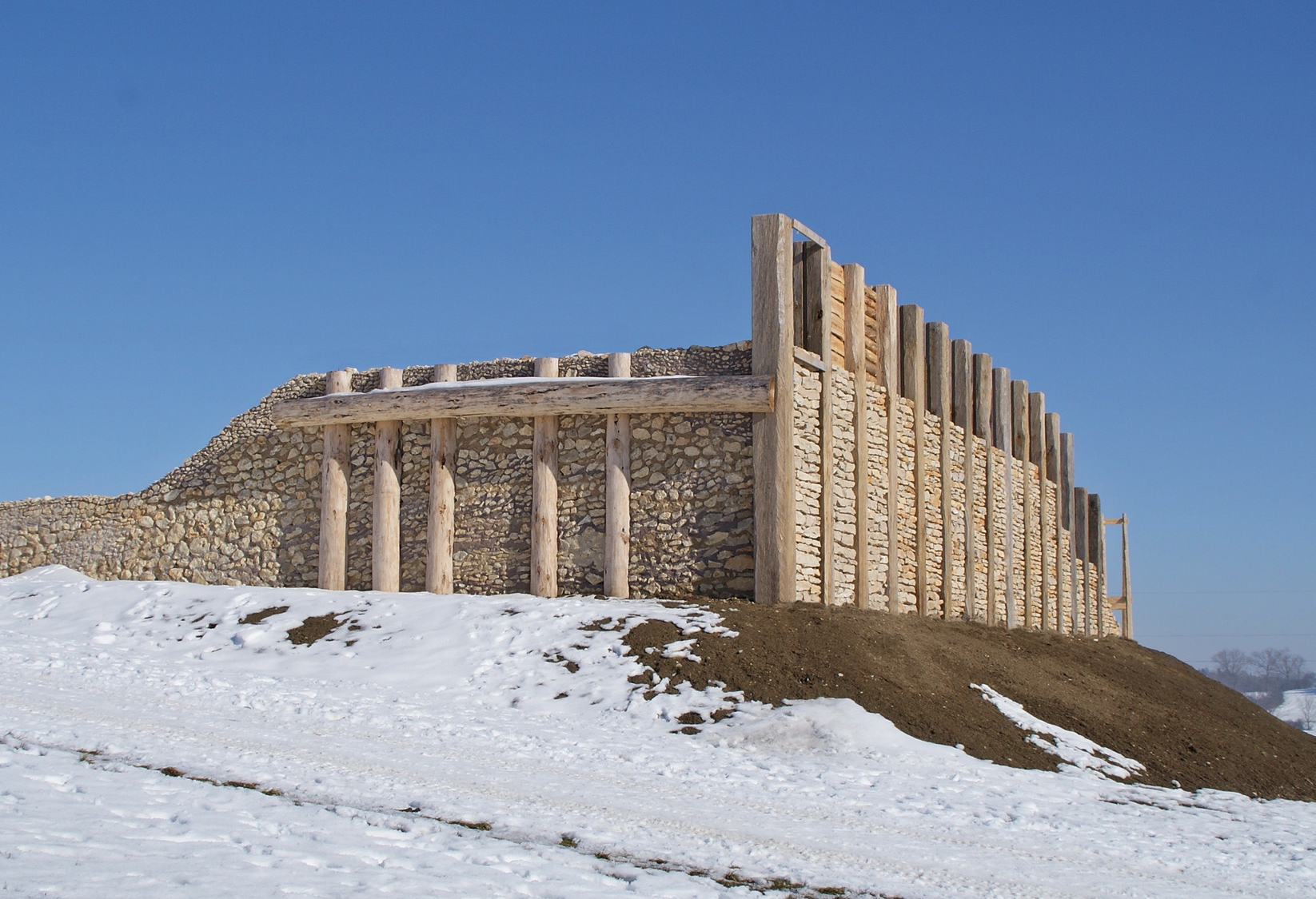
Reconstruction of a pfostenschlitzmauer wall at Ipf, Germany

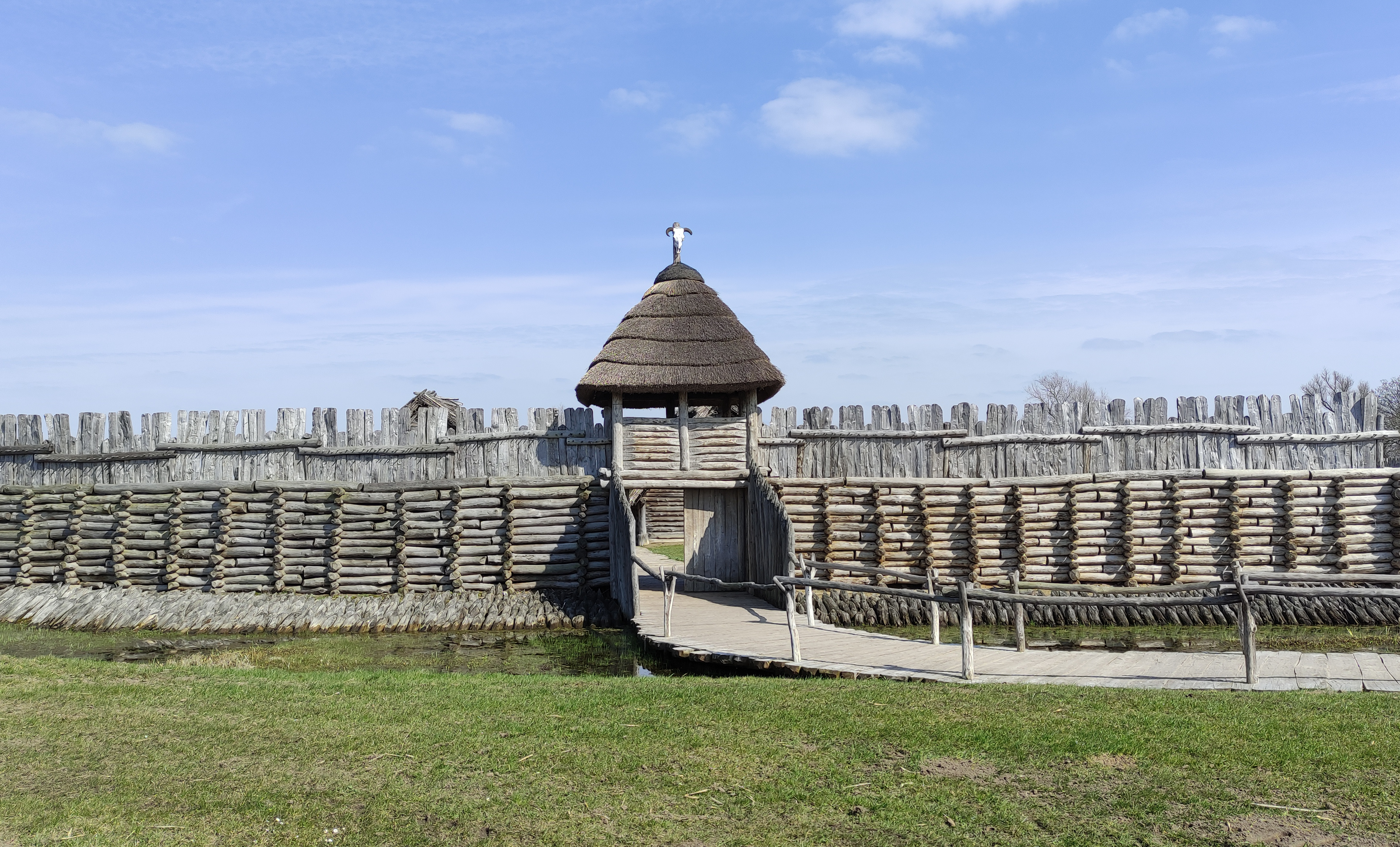
Biskupin fortified settlement reconstruction, Poland

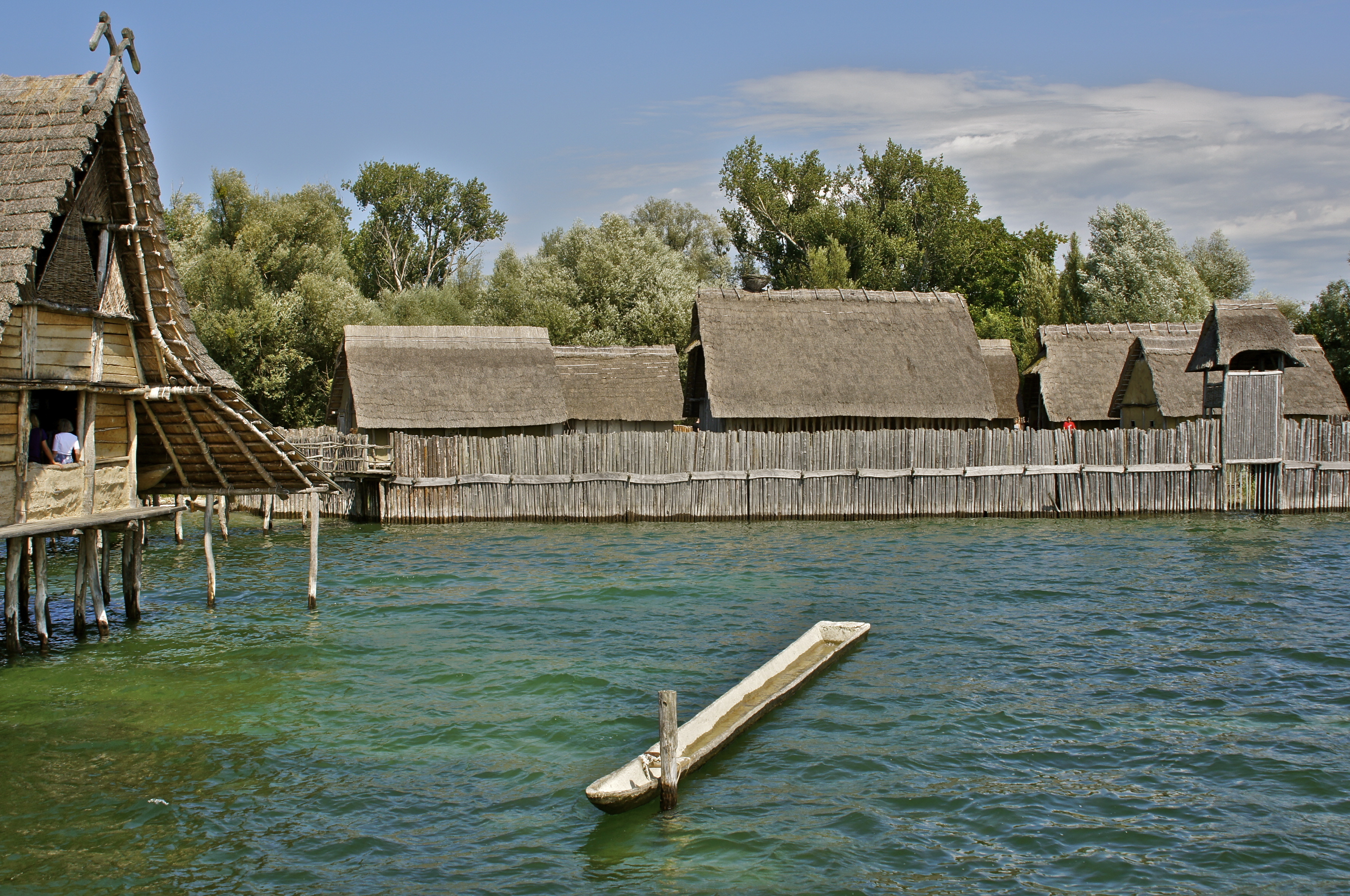
Lake Constance settlement reconstruction, Germany

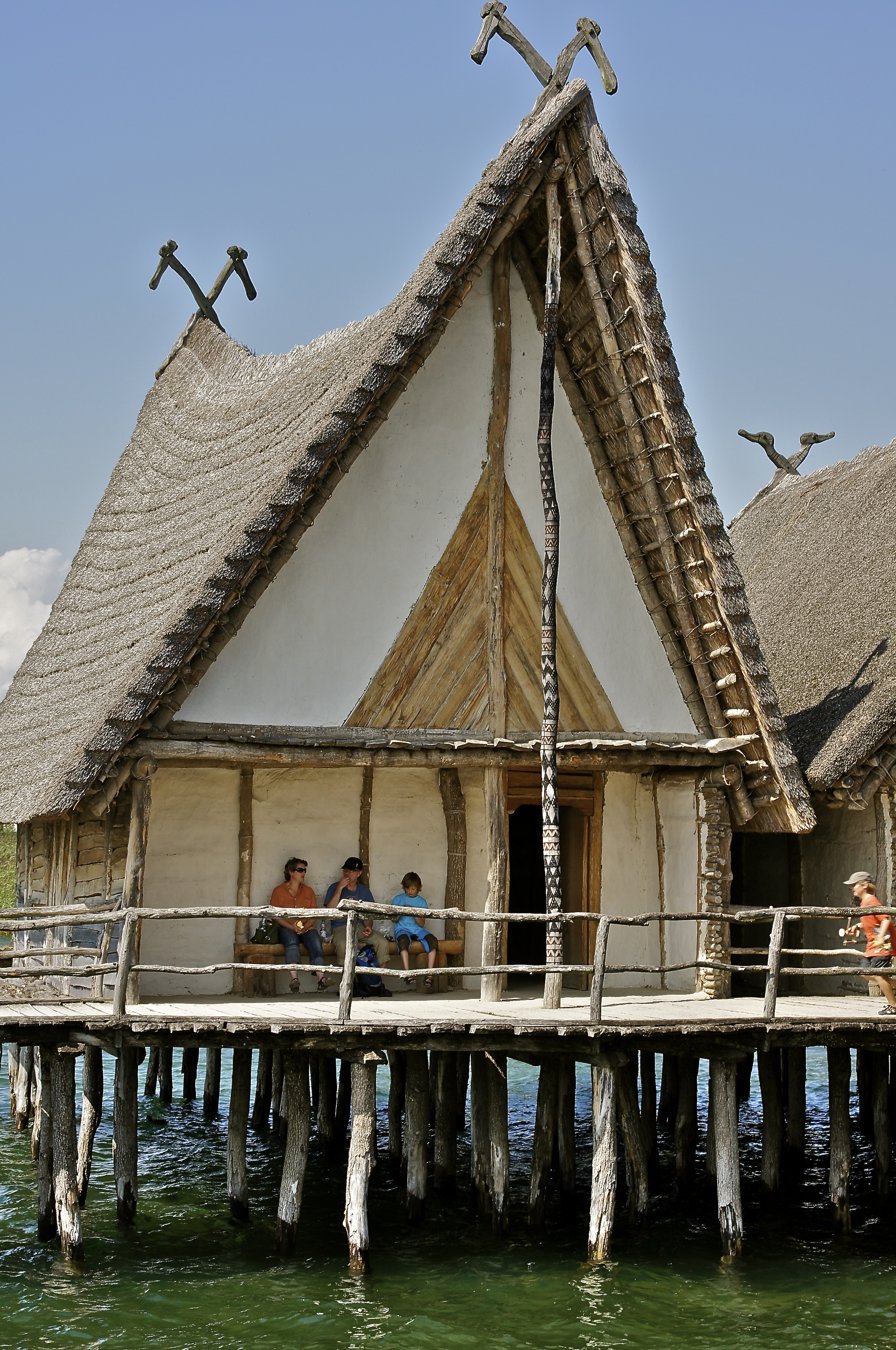
House reconstruction at Lake Constance, Germany

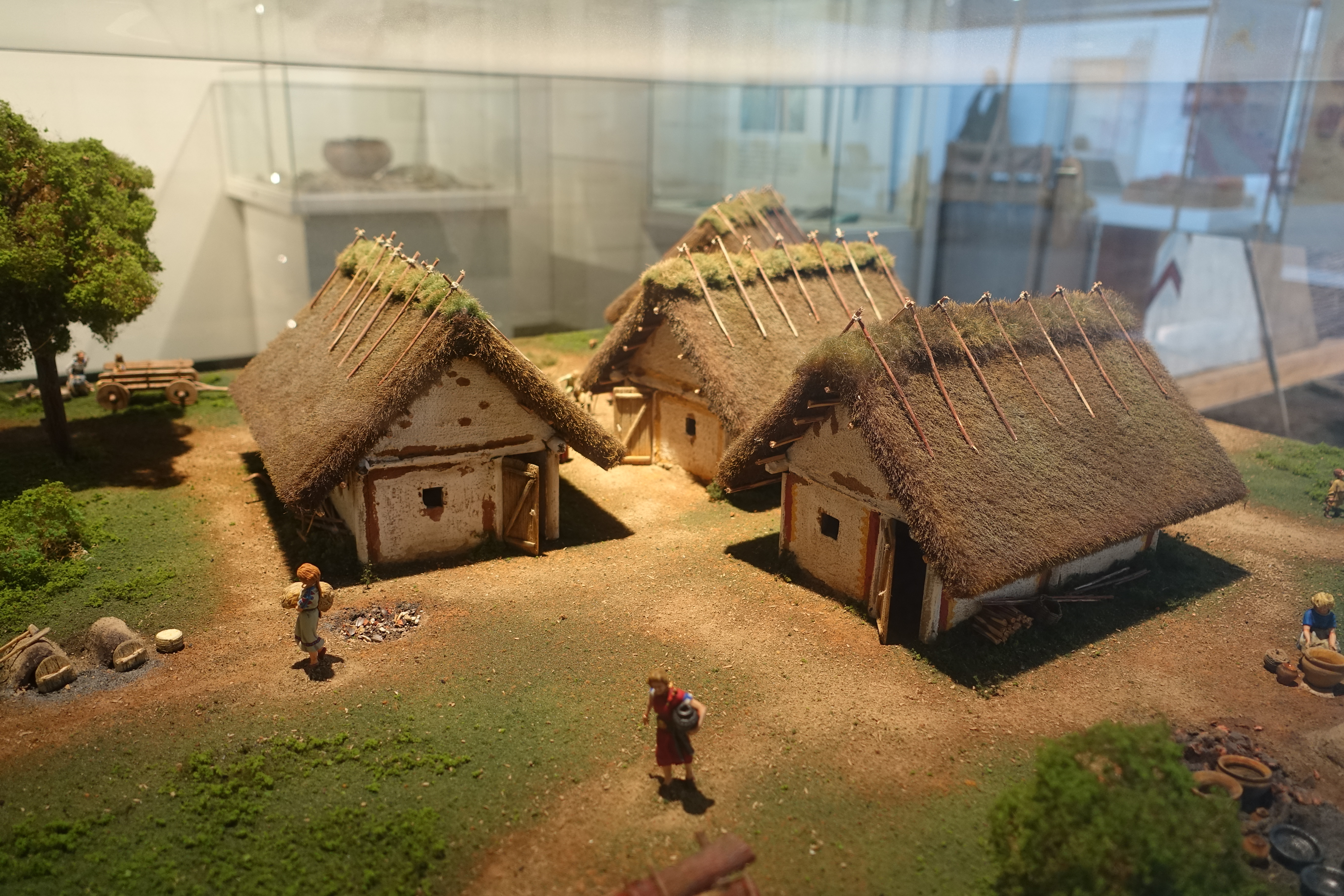
Urnfield period village model

== Material culture ==
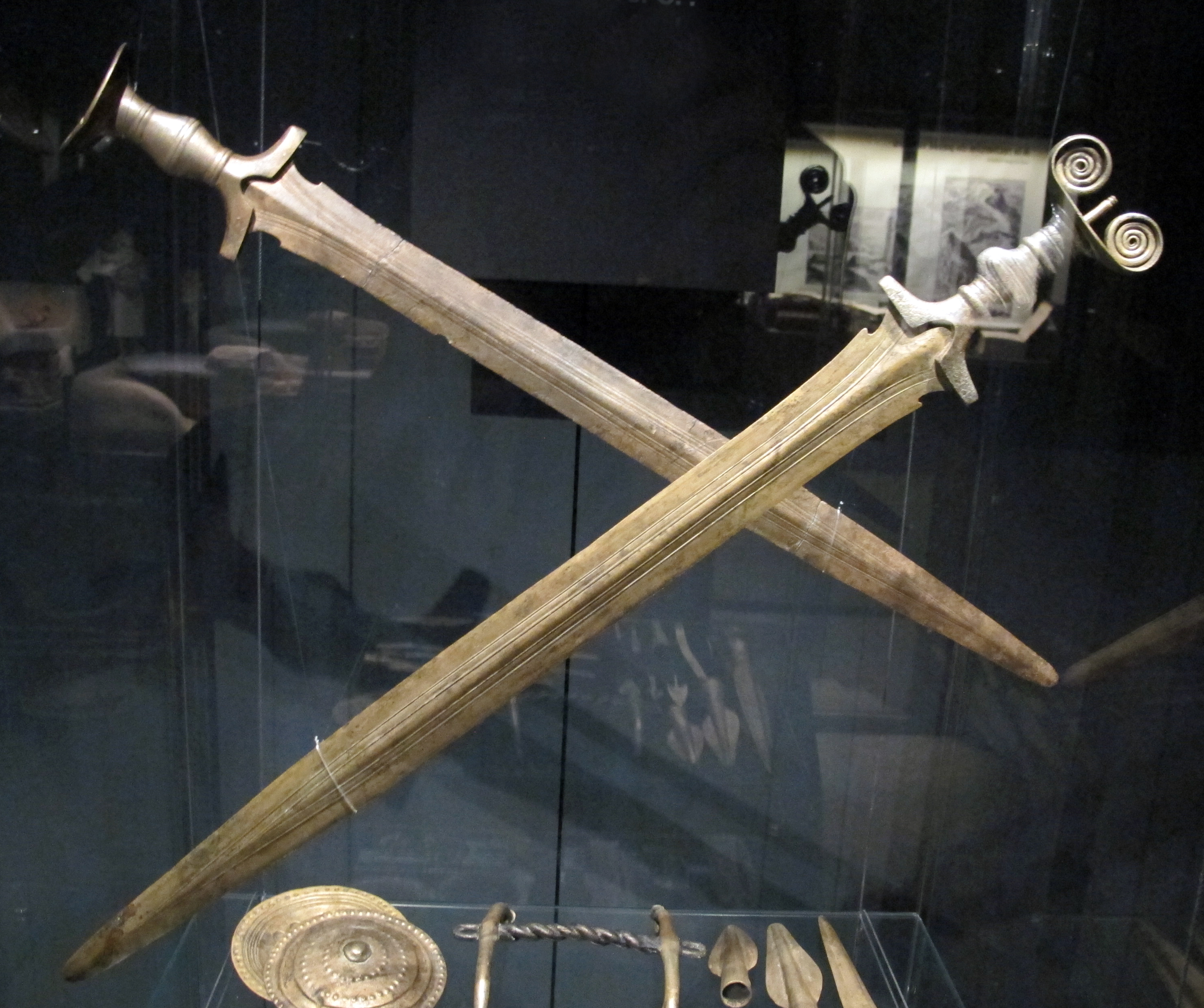
Late Bronze Age swords, Switzerland, c. 10th century BC. Cantonal Museum of Archeology and History

=== Pottery ===
The pottery is normally well-made, with a smooth surface and a normally sharply carinated profile. Some forms are thought to imitate metal prototypes. Biconical pots with cylindrical necks are especially characteristic. There is some incised decoration, but a large part of the surface was normally left plain. Fluted decoration is common. In the Swiss pile dwellings, the incised decoration was sometimes inlaid with tin foil. Pottery kilns were already known (Elchinger Kreuz, Bavaria), as is indicated by the homogeneous surface of the vessels as well. Other vessels include cups of beaten sheet-bronze with riveted handles (type Jenišovice) and large cauldrons with cross attachments. Wooden vessels have only been preserved in waterlogged contexts, for example, from Auvernier (Neuchâtel), but may have been quite widespread.

=== Tools and weapons ===
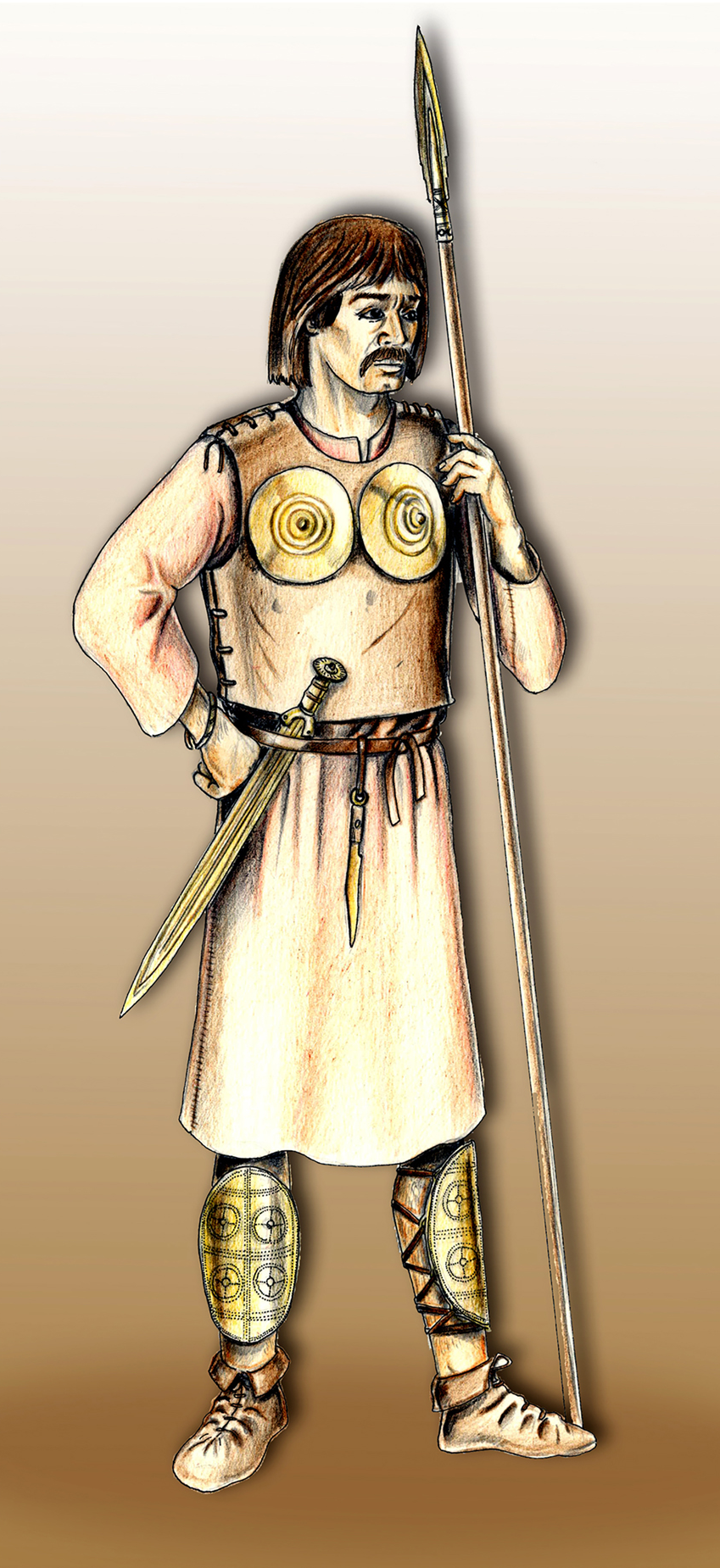
Urnfield period warrior, Hungary.

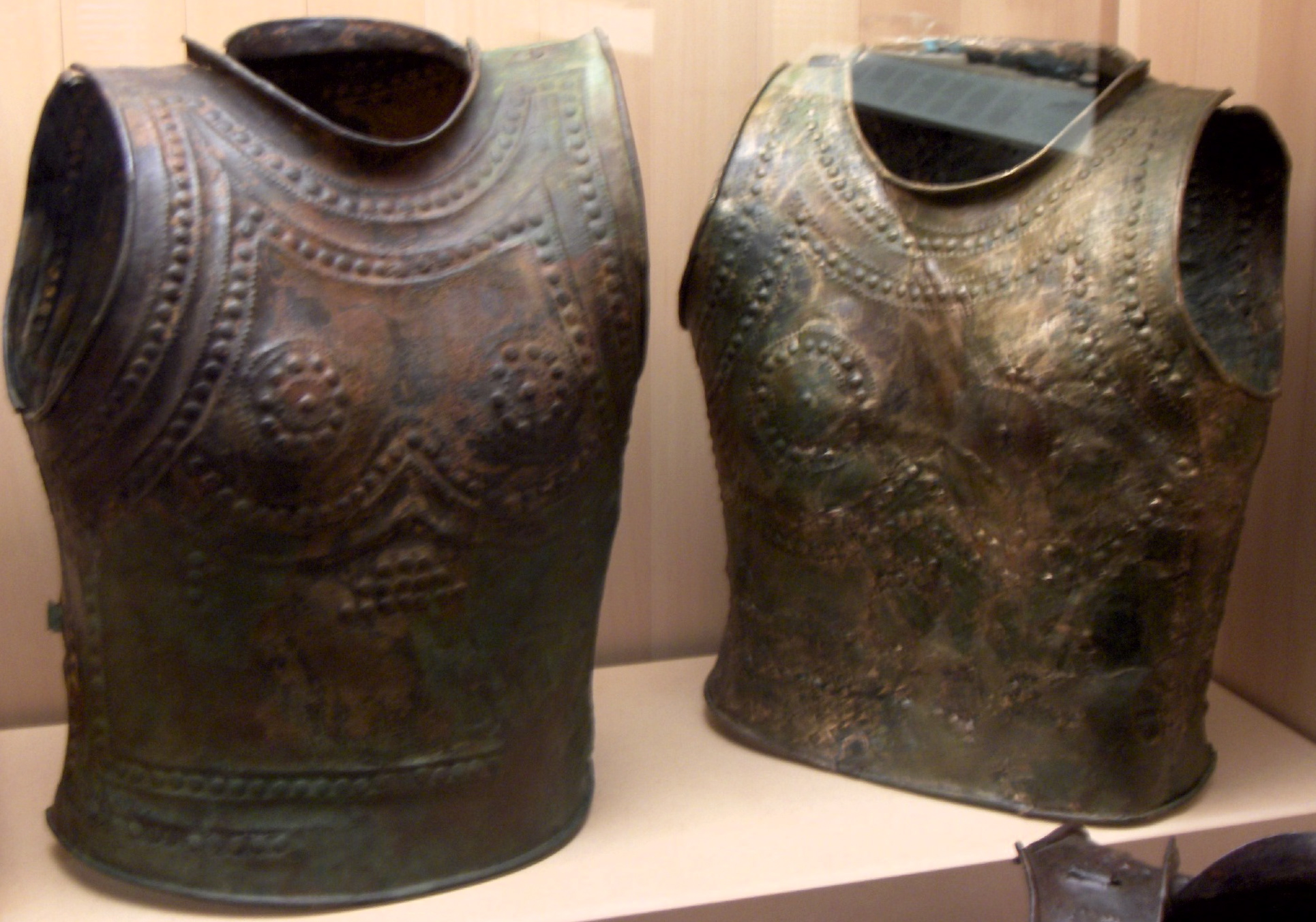
Bronze cuirasses from Marmesse in France, 9th century BC. National Archaeological Museum, France

The early Urnfield period (1300 BC) was a time when the warriors of central Europe could be heavily armored with body armor, helmets and shields all made of bronze, most likely borrowing the idea from Mycenaean Greece.

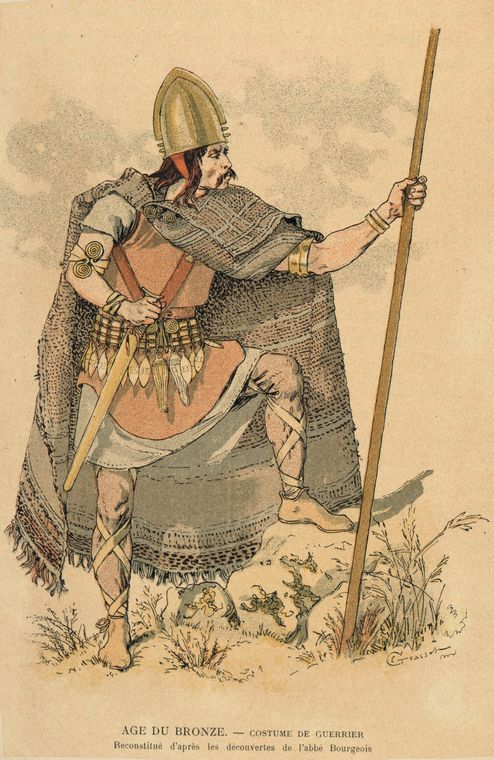
Urnfield warrior, France, illustration (1910)

The leaf-shaped Urnfield sword could be used for slashing, in contrast to the stabbing swords of the preceding Tumulus culture. It commonly possessed a ricasso. The hilt was normally made from bronze as well. It was cast separately and consisted of a different alloy. These solid-hilted swords were known since Bronze D (Rixheim swords). Other swords have tanged blades and probably had a wood, bone, or antler hilt. Flange-hilted swords had organic inlays in the hilt. Swords include Auvernier, Kressborn-Hemigkofen, Erbenheim, Möhringen, Weltenburg, Hemigkofen, and Tachlovice-types.

Protective gear like shields, cuirasses, greaves, and helmets are rare and rarely found in burials. The best-known example of a bronze shield comes from Plzeň in Bohemia and has a riveted handhold. Comparable pieces have been found in Germany, Western Poland, Denmark, Great Britain, and Ireland. They are supposed to have been made in upper Italy or the Eastern Alps and imitate wooden shields. Irish bogs have yielded examples of leather shields (Clonbrinn, Co. Wexford). Bronze cuirasses are known since Bronze D (Čaka, grave II, Slovakia).

Complete bronze cuirasses have been found in Saint Germain du Plain, nine examples, one inside the other, in Marmesse, Haute Marne (France), and fragments in Albstadt-Pfeffingen (Germany). Bronze dishes (phalerae) may have been sewn on a leather armour. Greaves of richly decorated sheet-bronze are known from Kloštar Ivanić (Croatia) and the Paulus cave near Beuron (Germany).

=== Chariots and wagons ===
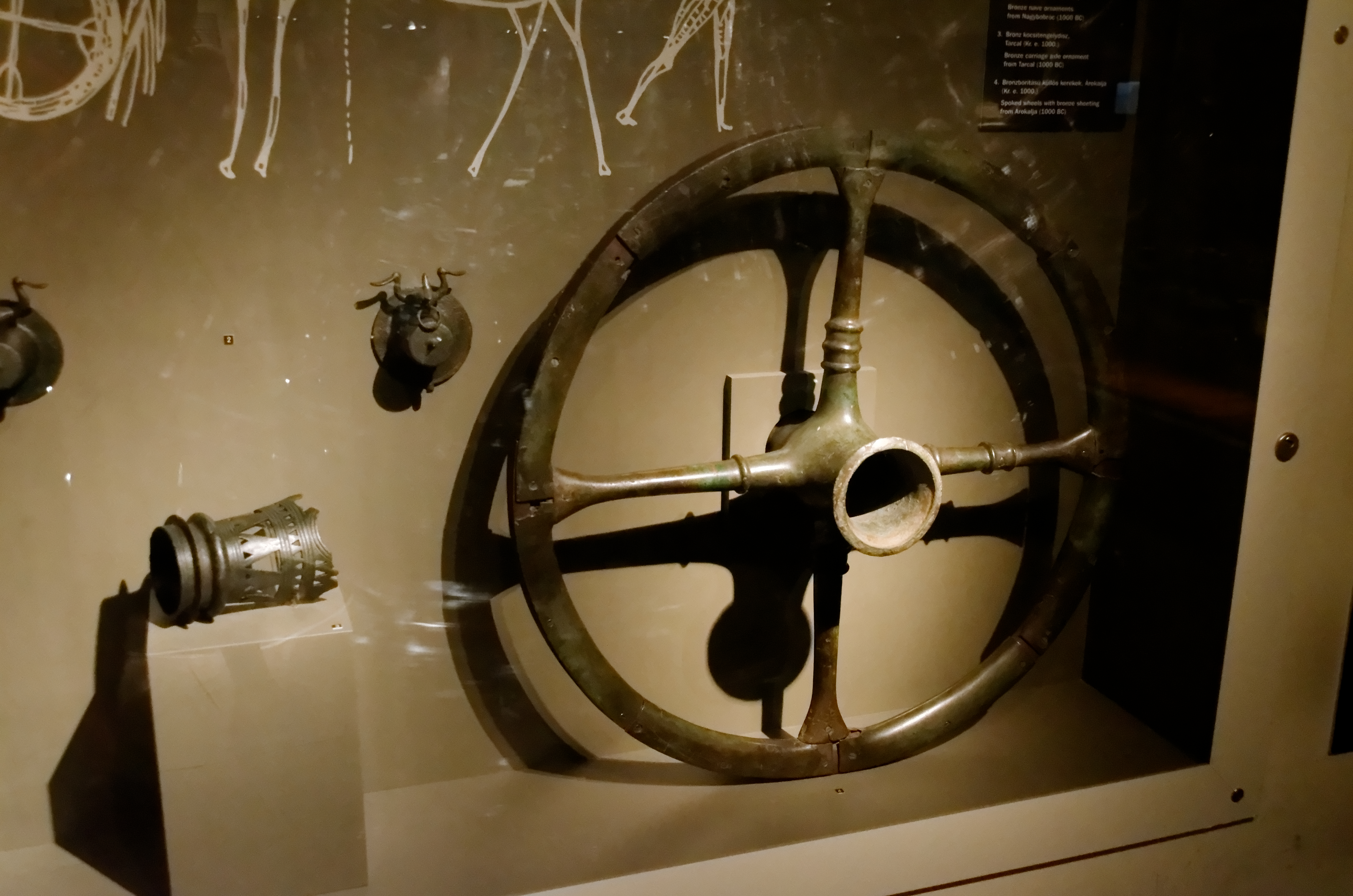
One of a pair of bronze chariot wheels from Arokalja in Romania, c. 13th-12th centuries BC

About a dozen wagon-burials of four-wheeled wagons with bronze fittings are known from the early Urnfield period. They include Hart an der Altz (Kr. Altötting), Mengen (Kr. Sigmaringen), Poing (Kr. Ebersberg), Königsbronn (Kr. Heidenheim) from Germany, and St. Sulpice (Vaud), Switzerland. In Alz, the chariot had been placed on the pyre, and pieces of bone were attached to the partially melted metal of the axles. Bronze (one-part) bits appear at the same time. Two-part horse bits are only known from late Urnfield contexts and may be due to eastern influence. Wood- and bronze-spoked wheels are known from Stade (Germany), a wooden spoked wheel from Mercurago, Italy. Wooden dish-wheels have been excavated at Courcelettes, Switzerland, and the Wasserburg Buchau, Germany (diameter 80 cm).

Bronze spoked wheels from Hassloch and Stade (in Germany) have been described as "the most ambitious craft endeavour of all Bronze Age bronze objects", representing "the highest achievement of prehistoric bronze casters in non-Greek Europe ... In terms of casting technique, they are on a par with the casting of a Greek bronze statue."

==== Cult wagon models ====
In Milavče near Domažlice, Bohemia, a four-wheeled miniature bronze wagon bearing a large cauldron (diameter 30 cm) contained a cremation. This exceptionally rich burial was covered by a barrow. The bronze wagon model from Acholshausen in (Bavaria) comes from a male burial.

Such wagons are also known from the Nordic Bronze Age. The Skallerup wagon, Denmark, contained a cremation as well. At Peckatel (Kr. Schwerin) in Mecklenburg a cauldron-wagon and other rich grave goods accompanied an inhumation under a barrow (Montelius III/IV). Another example comes from Ystad in Sweden. South-eastern European examples include Kanya in Hungary and Orăştie in Romania. Clay miniature wagons, sometimes with waterfowl, were known there since the middle Bronze Age (Dupljaja, Vojvodina, Serbia).

A Lusatian chariot model from Burg (Brandenburg, Germany) has three wheels on a single axle, on which waterfowl perch. The grave of Gammertingen (Kr. Sigmaringen, Germany) contained two socketed horned applications that probably belonged to a miniature wagon comparable to the Burg example, together with six miniature spoked wheels.

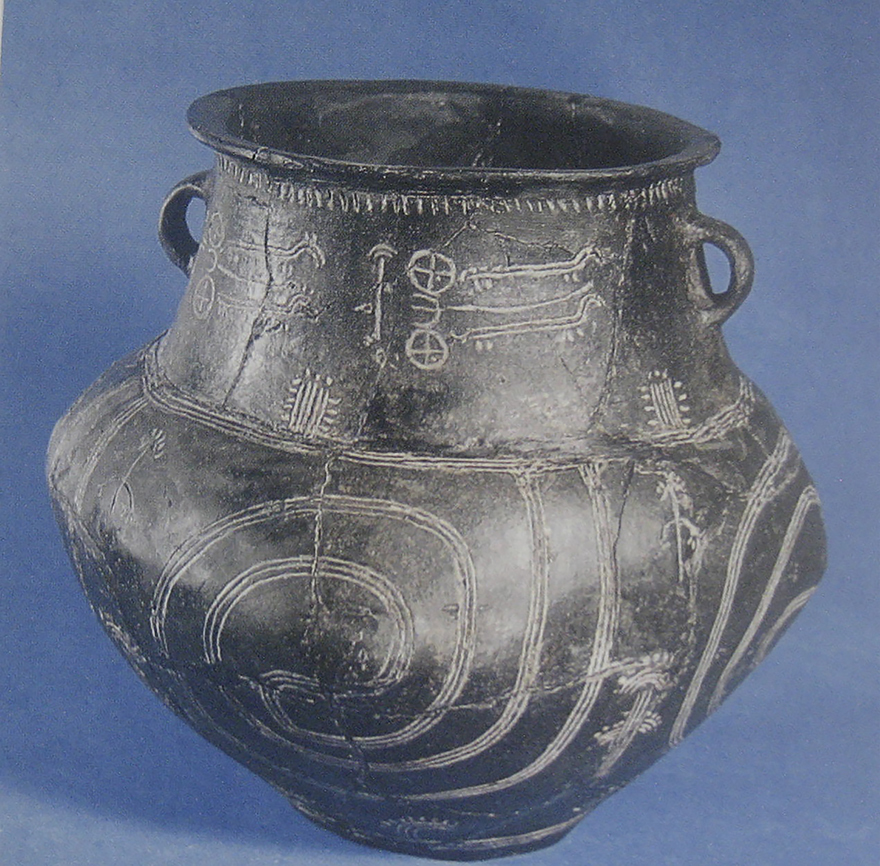
Urn with chariot depictions, Slovakia, 14th century BC.

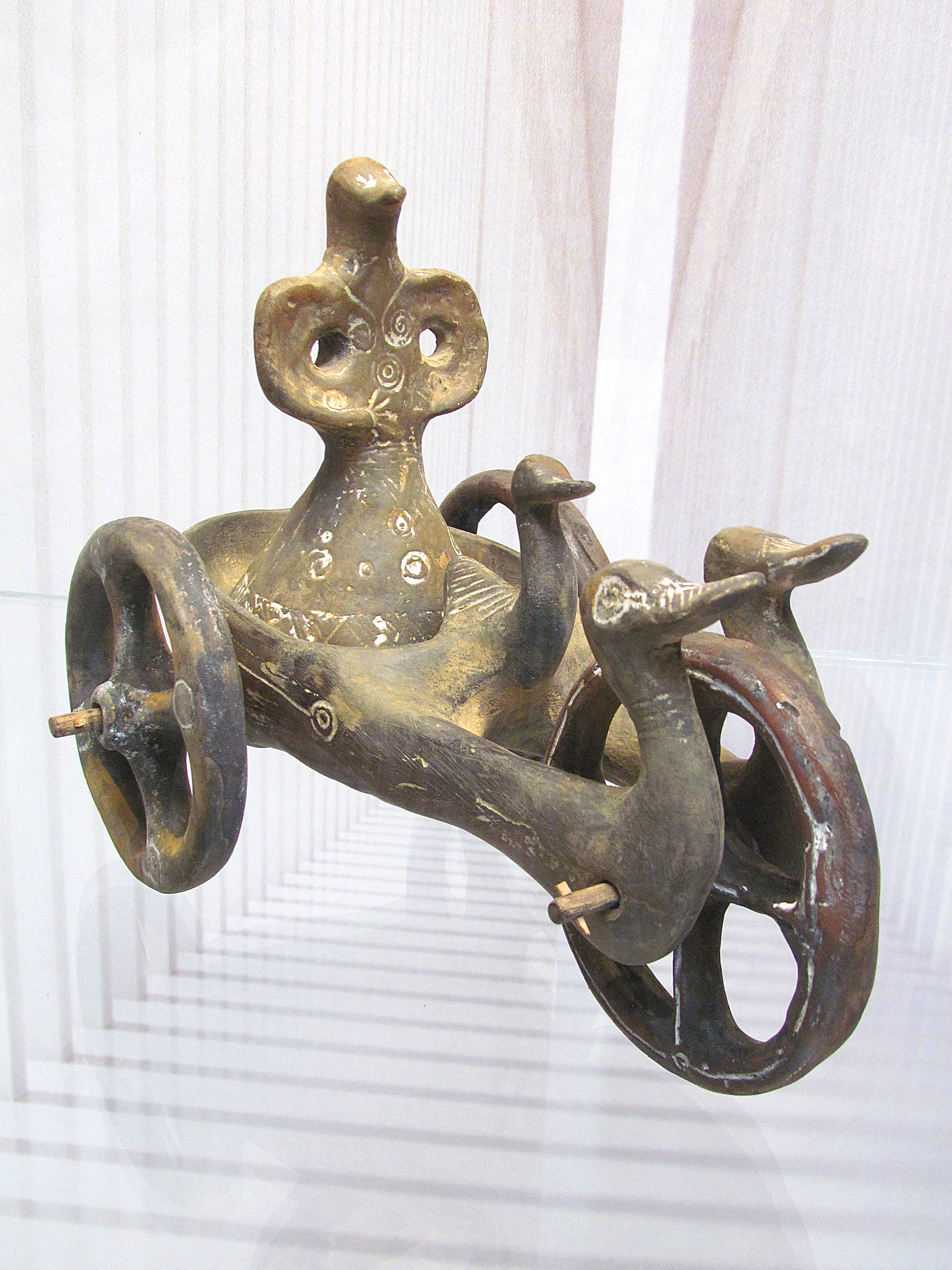
Cult chariot model from Dupljaja, Serbia, c. 1300 BC.

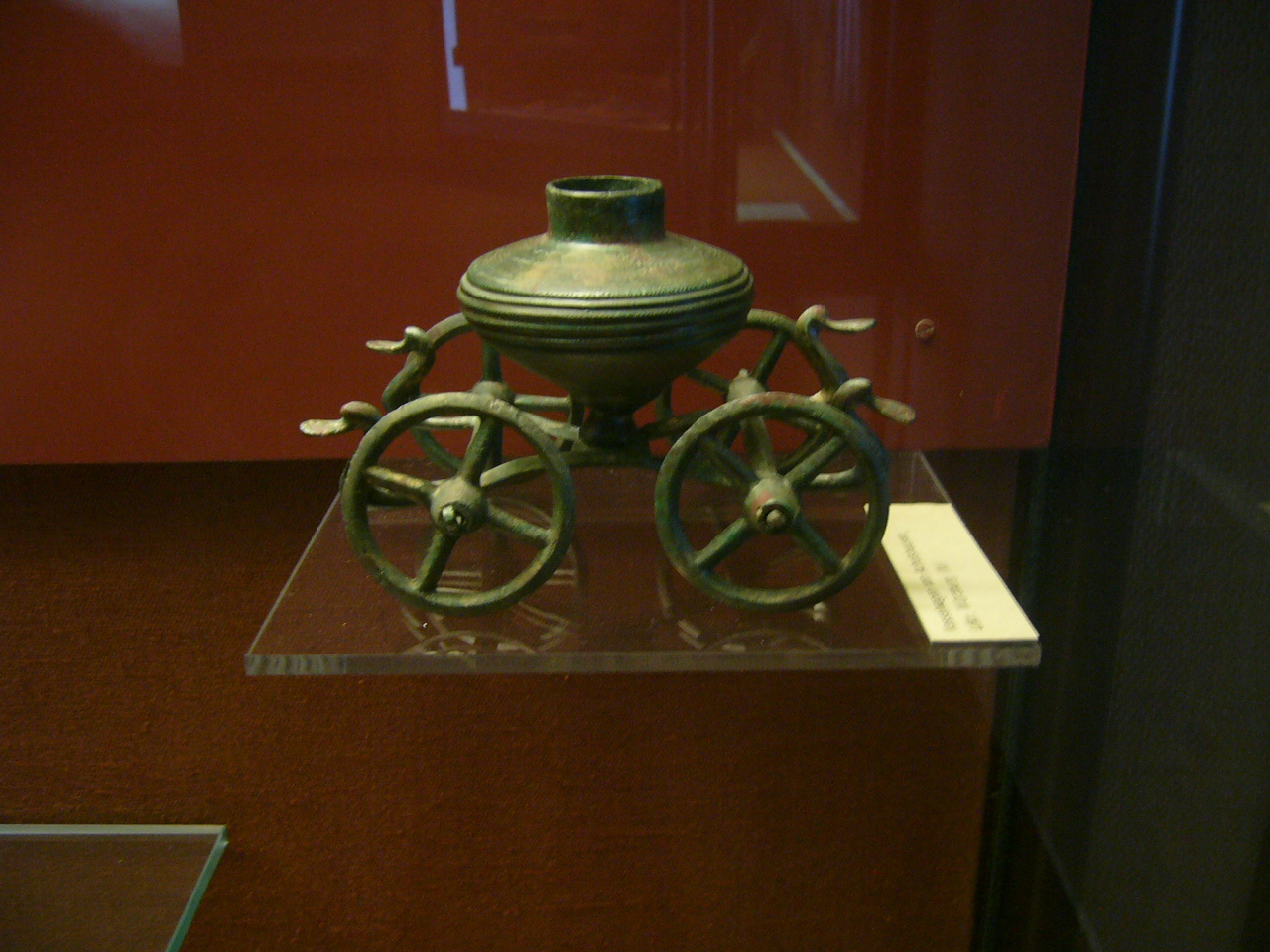
Bronze cult wagon model from Acholshausen in Germany c. 1000 BC.

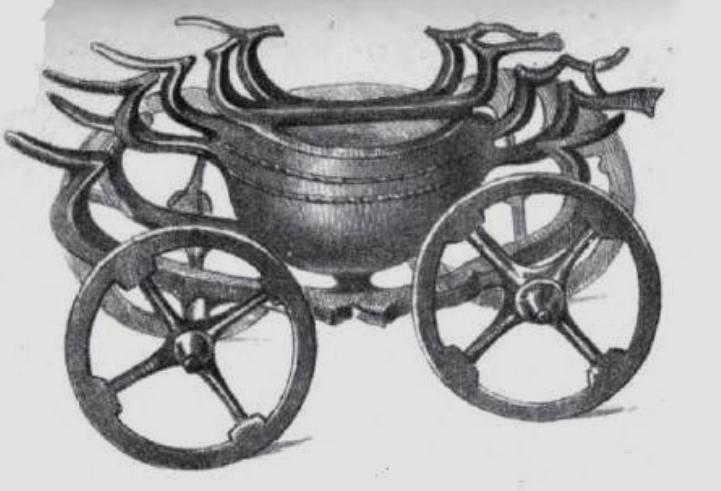
Bronze cult wagon model from Orăştie in Romania.

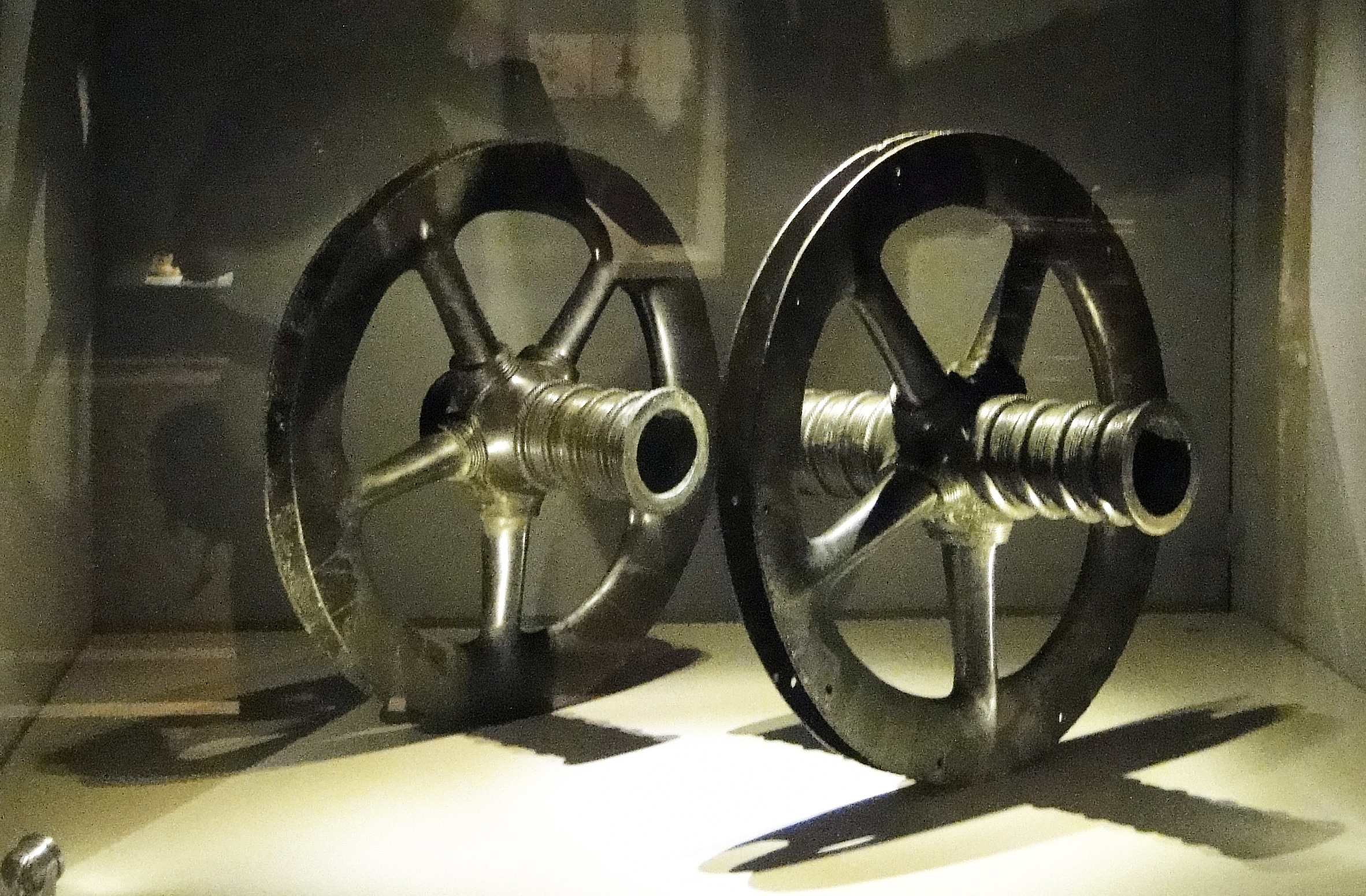
Bronze wheels from Hassloch in Germany, 900-800 BC

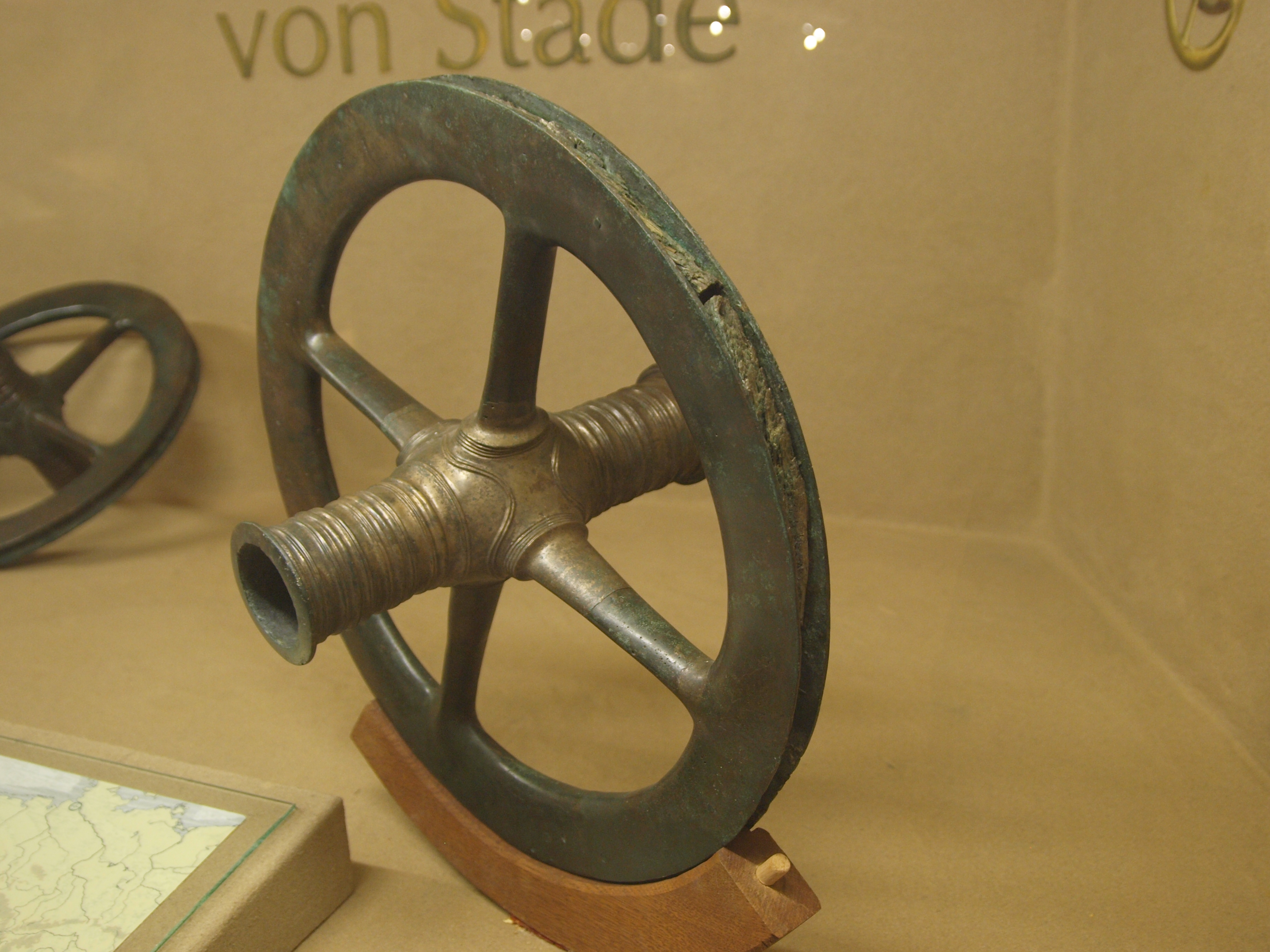
Bronze wheel from Stade, Germany, c. 1000 BC

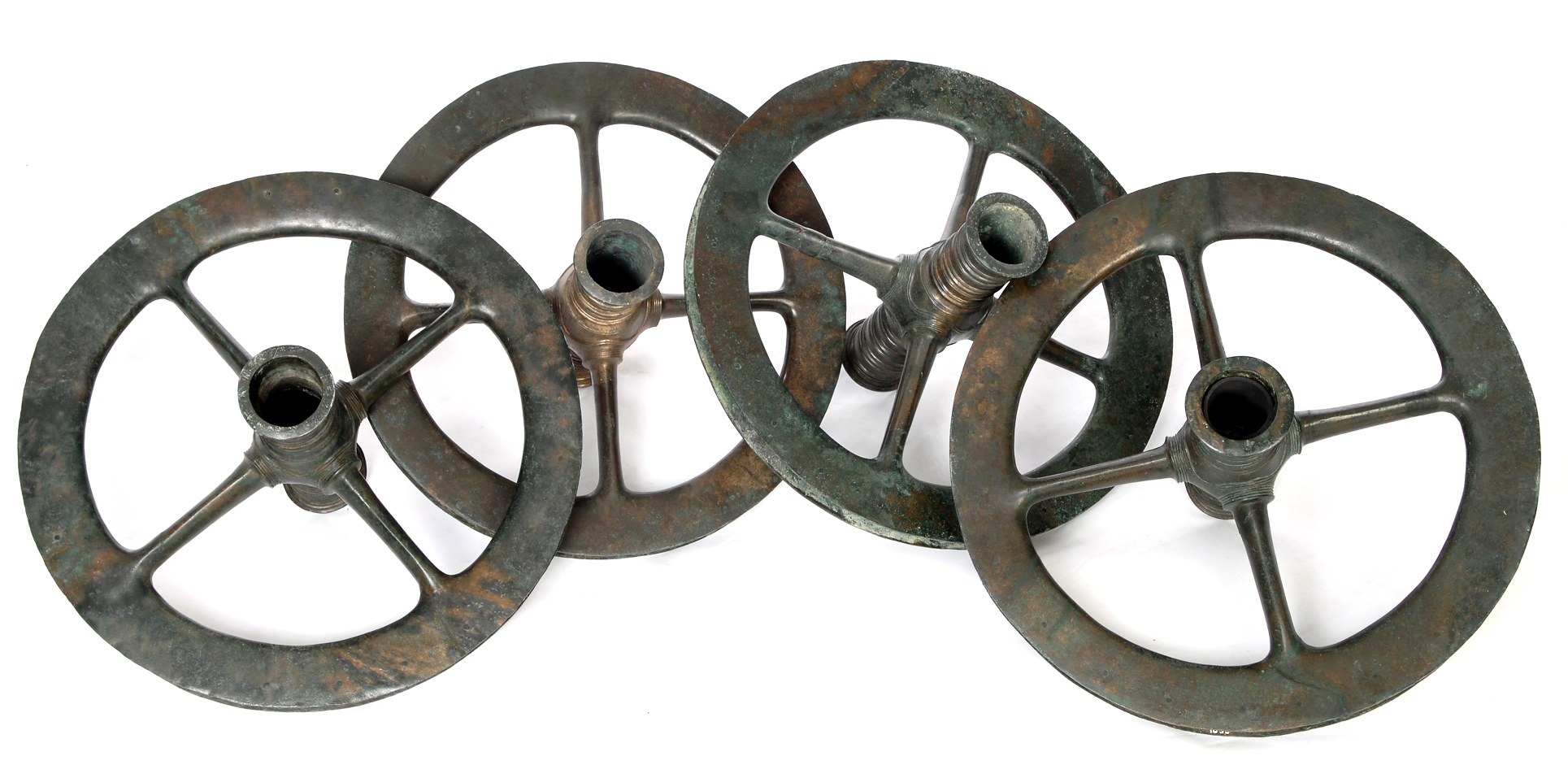
Bronze wheels from Stade, Germany, c. 1000 BC

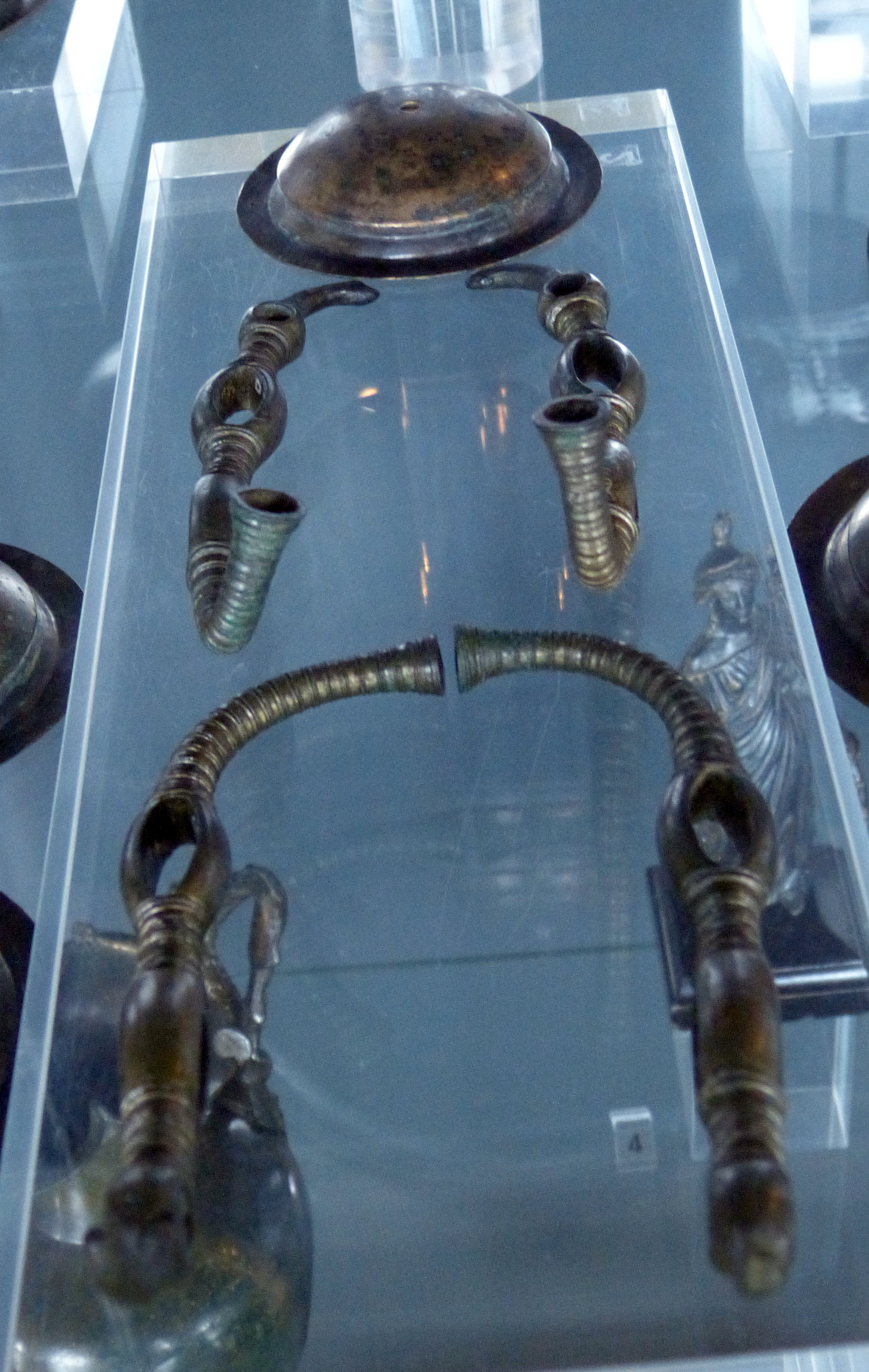
Chariot horse harness parts from Karbow, Germany.

=== Hoards ===
Hoards are very common in the Urnfield culture. The custom was abandoned at the end of the Bronze Age. They were often deposited in rivers and wet places like swamps. As these spots were often quite inaccessible, they most probably represent gifts to the gods. Other hoards contain either broken or miscast objects that were probably intended for reuse by bronze smiths. As Late Urnfield hoards often contain the same range of objects as earlier graves, some scholars interpret hoarding as a way to supply personal equipment for the hereafter. In the river Trieux, Côtes du Nord, complete swords were found together with numerous antlers of red deer that may have had a religious significance as well.

== Iron ==
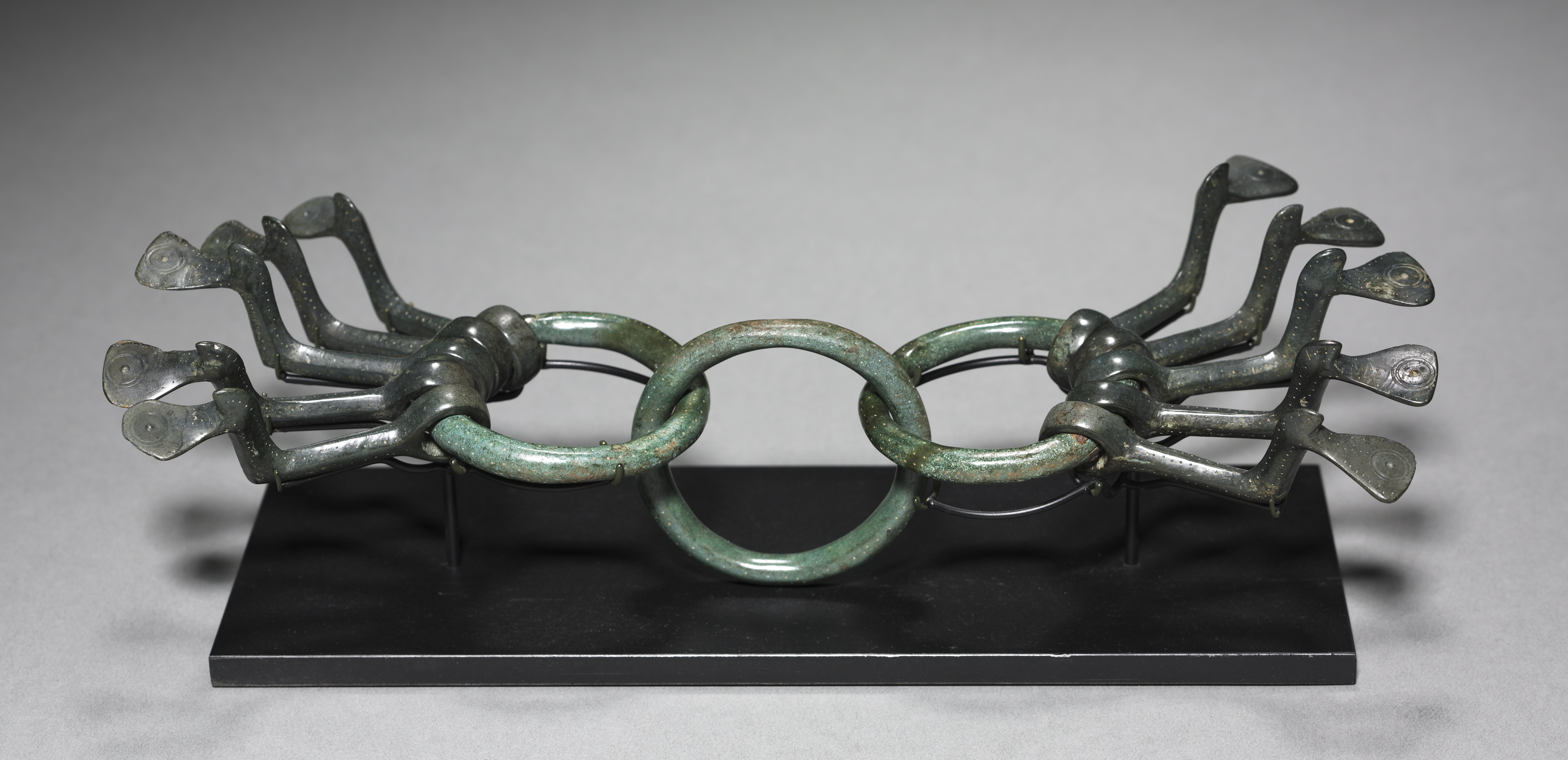
Bronze ornament with iron rivets, c. 1200 BC

An iron knife or sickle from Ganovce in Slovakia, possibly dating from the 18th century BC, may be the earliest evidence of smelted iron in Central Europe. Other early finds include an iron ring from Vorwohlde (Germany) dating from c. the 15th century BC (Reinecke B), and an iron chisel from Heegermühle (Germany) dating from c. 1000 BC. During the late Bronze Age, iron was used to decorate the hilts of swords (Schwäbisch-Hall-Gailenkirchen, Unterkrumbach, Kr. Hersbruck), knives (Dotternhausen, Plettenberg, Germany), pins and some other ornaments. The Carpathian Basin was an early centre of iron technology, with iron artefacts dating from the 10th century BC, and possibly as early as the 12th century BC. Regular use of iron for weapons and tools in Central Europe began with the Hallstatt culture.

== Economy ==
Cattle, pigs, sheep and goats were kept, as well as horses, dogs and geese. The cattle were rather small, with a height of 1.20 m at the withers. Horses were not much bigger with a mean of 1.25 m.

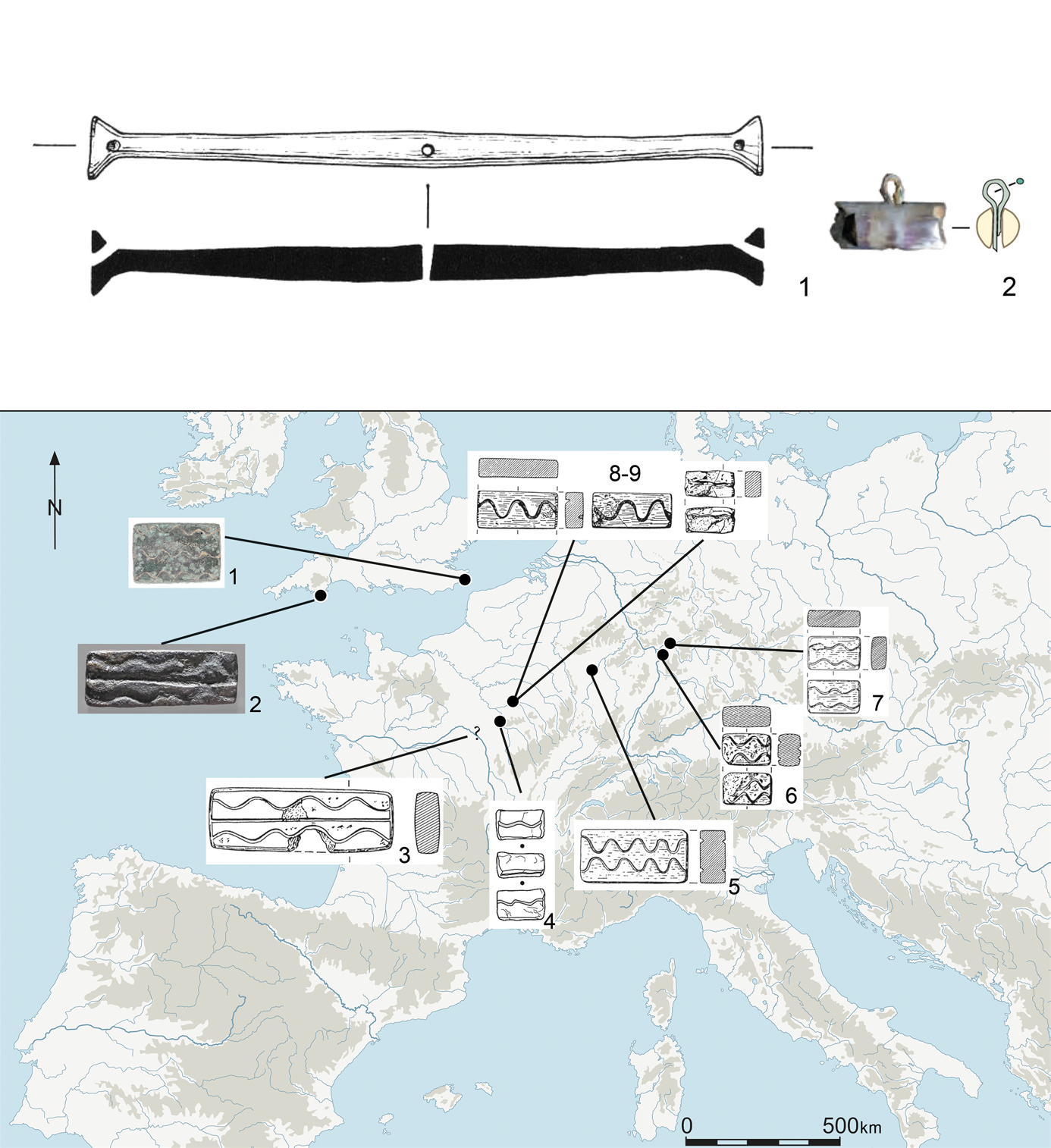
Weighing equipment from Germany, France and Britain, c. 1200-1000 BC

Forest clearance was intensive in the Urnfield period. Probably open meadows were created for the first time, as shown by pollen analysis. This led to increased erosion and sediment-load of the rivers. New crops and more intensive agrarian regimes are introduced, transforming landscapes on a large scale.

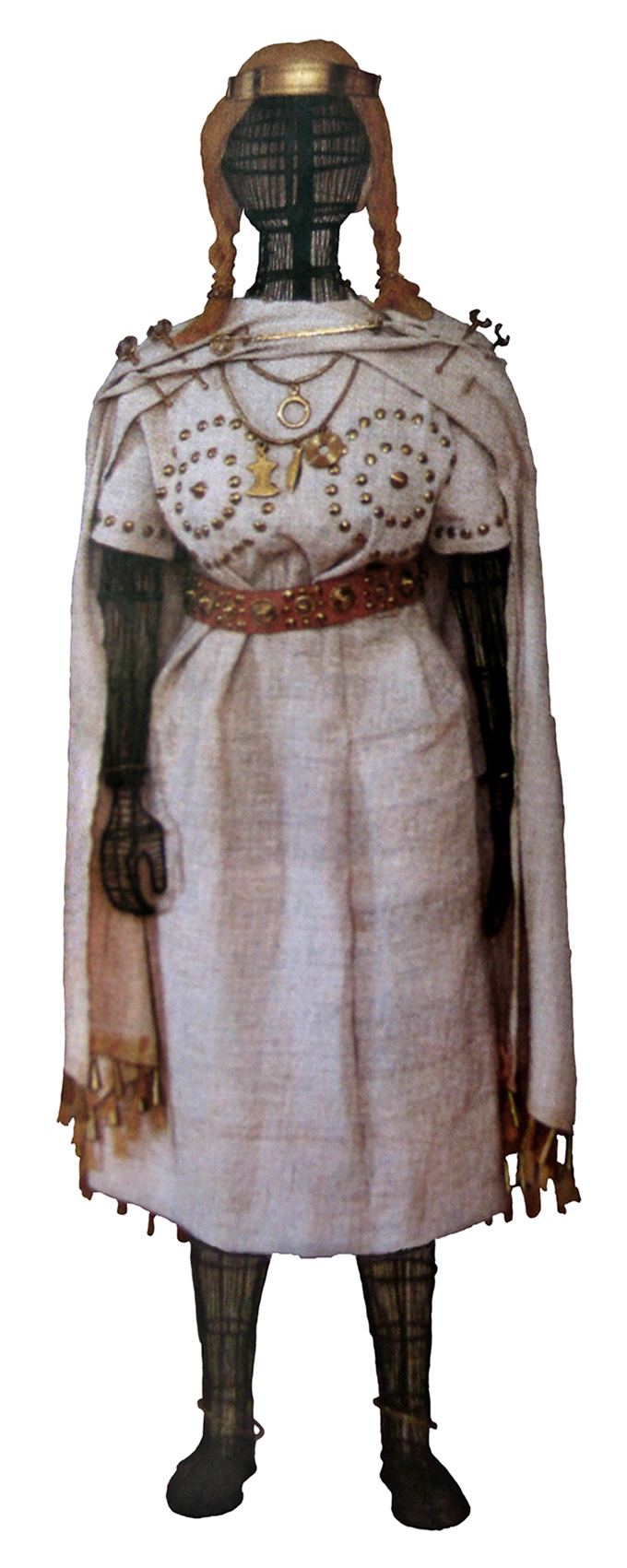
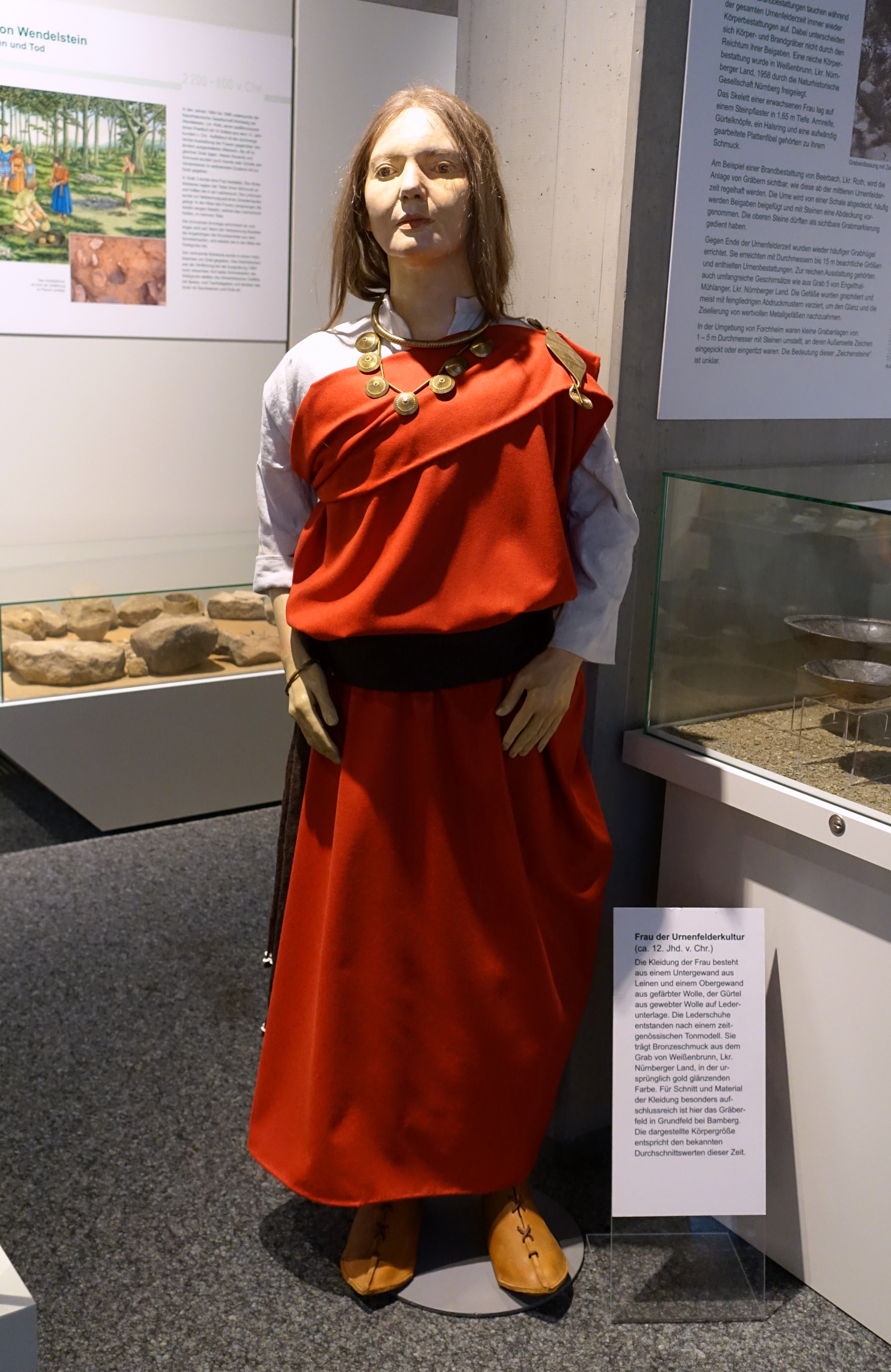
Left: High-status female, Slovakia. Right: Urnfield culture dress (reconstruction).

Wheat and barley were cultivated, together with pulses and the horse bean. Poppy seeds were used for oil or as a drug. Millet and oats were cultivated for the first time in Hungary and Bohemia, and rye was already cultivated; further west it was only a noxious weed. Flax seems to have been of reduced importance, maybe because mainly wool was used for clothes. Hazel nuts, apples, pears, sloes and acorns were collected. Some rich graves contain bronze sieves that have been interpreted as wine-sieves (Hart an der Alz). This beverage would have been imported from the South, but supporting evidence is lacking. In the lacustrine settlement of Zug, remains of a broth made of spelt and millet have been found. In the lower-Rhine urnfields, leavened bread was often placed on the pyre and burnt fragments have thus been preserved.

Wool was spun (finds of spindle whorls are common) and woven on the warp-weighted loom; bronze needles (Unteruhldingen) were used for sewing.

Copper mining was of great economic importance in the northern Eastern Alps. The Mitterberg and Kitzbühel Alps in Austria were of supra-regional significance. Numerous wooden tools were found in the Kelchalm district near Kitzbühel, situated at an altitude of 1500 meters, including tally sticks used for counting, indicating the beginnings of administrative management. In Altmännern, remains of timber framing, drainage troughs, and sieves were found, suggesting underground processing, along with a leather apron. In Wörgl, an industrial area with over 100 hearths was discovered. In Krumpenthal (Styria), a larger area for multi-stage smelting was found, featuring roasting beds and furnaces. Twin furnace systems with roasting beds on two work platforms are characteristic of the Eastern Alps.

Salt production in the Salzkammergut region in Austria dates back to the Middle Bronze Age. However, in the 13th century BC, underground mining of rock salt in solid form began. In Hallstatt, the finds extend to a depth of 215 meters below the earth's surface. Wooden tools such as troughs were manufactured in a completely uniform manner, suggesting industrial-style production.

Weighing scales were used for trade and weighed metal was used as a form of payment or money. Bronze sickles are also thought to have served as a form of commodity money.

There is some suggestion that the Urnfield culture is associated with a wetter climatic period than the earlier Tumulus cultures. This may be associated with the diversion of the mid-latitude winter storms north of the Pyrenees and the Alps, possibly associated with drier conditions in the Mediterranean basin.

== Numerals ==
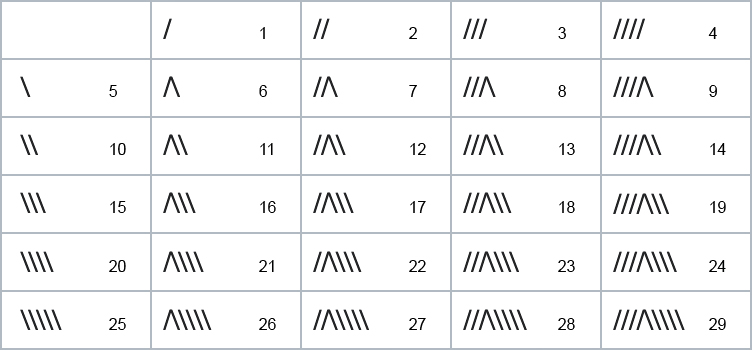
The cast mark numeral system

Large hoards of sickles dating from the Bronze Age have been excavated across central Europe which feature a range of cast markings. An analysis of the Frankleben hoard and other sickle hoards from Germany dating from the Tumulus and Urnfield periods found that markings on the sickles constitute a numeral system related to the lunar calendar. According to the Halle State Museum of Prehistory:

"Many sickles carry line-shaped markings. The scope and order of these brands follows a defined pattern. This sign language can be interpreted as a pre-form of a writing system. There are two types of symbols: line-shaped marks below the button and marks at the angle or at the base of the sickle body. The archaeologist Christoph Sommerfeld examined the rules and realized that the casting marks are composed of one to nine ribs. After four left-hand, individually counted strokes there follows a bundle as a group of five on the right side. This creates a counting system that reaches to 29. The Synodic Moon orbit lasts 29 days or nights. This number and the lunar shape of the sickle suggest that the stroke groups should be interpreted as pages of a calendar, as a point in the monthly cycle. The sickle marks are the oldest known sign system in Central Europe."

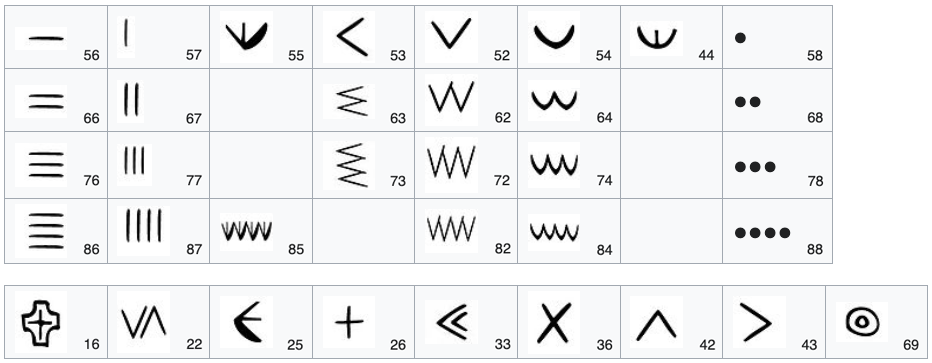
Some other symbols or marks found on the sickles

The sickles also feature other marks or symbols which the archaeologist Christoph Sommmerfeld (1994) suggests may represent 'conceptual signs', or a type of proto-writing. Markings on sickles and tools from across Bronze Age Europe have been interpreted by other authors as ownership marks, sign systems, number systems or "units of information" of unknown meaning.

'Counting marks' have also been identified on bronze armrings and ingots from the Urnfield period, possibly related to trade. Similar markings found on pottery have been interpreted as serving a calendar function.

Simple numerals in the form of lines and dots are found on identical 'ritual objects' from Haschendorf in Austria and Balkåkra in Sweden, which represent assembly instructions for the objects. The decorated discs on both objects have been interpreted as solar calendars. The repeated use of numbers 10, 20 and 30 in the construction of the Balkåkra and Haschendorf objects suggests the use of a ten-digit system.

The archaeologist Mikkel Hansen (2019) has suggested that the Urnfield sickle-numeral system may be related to 'hand signs' found among petroglyphs from the Nordic Bronze Age, which may have a similar numerical and calendrical meaning.

== Golden hats ==
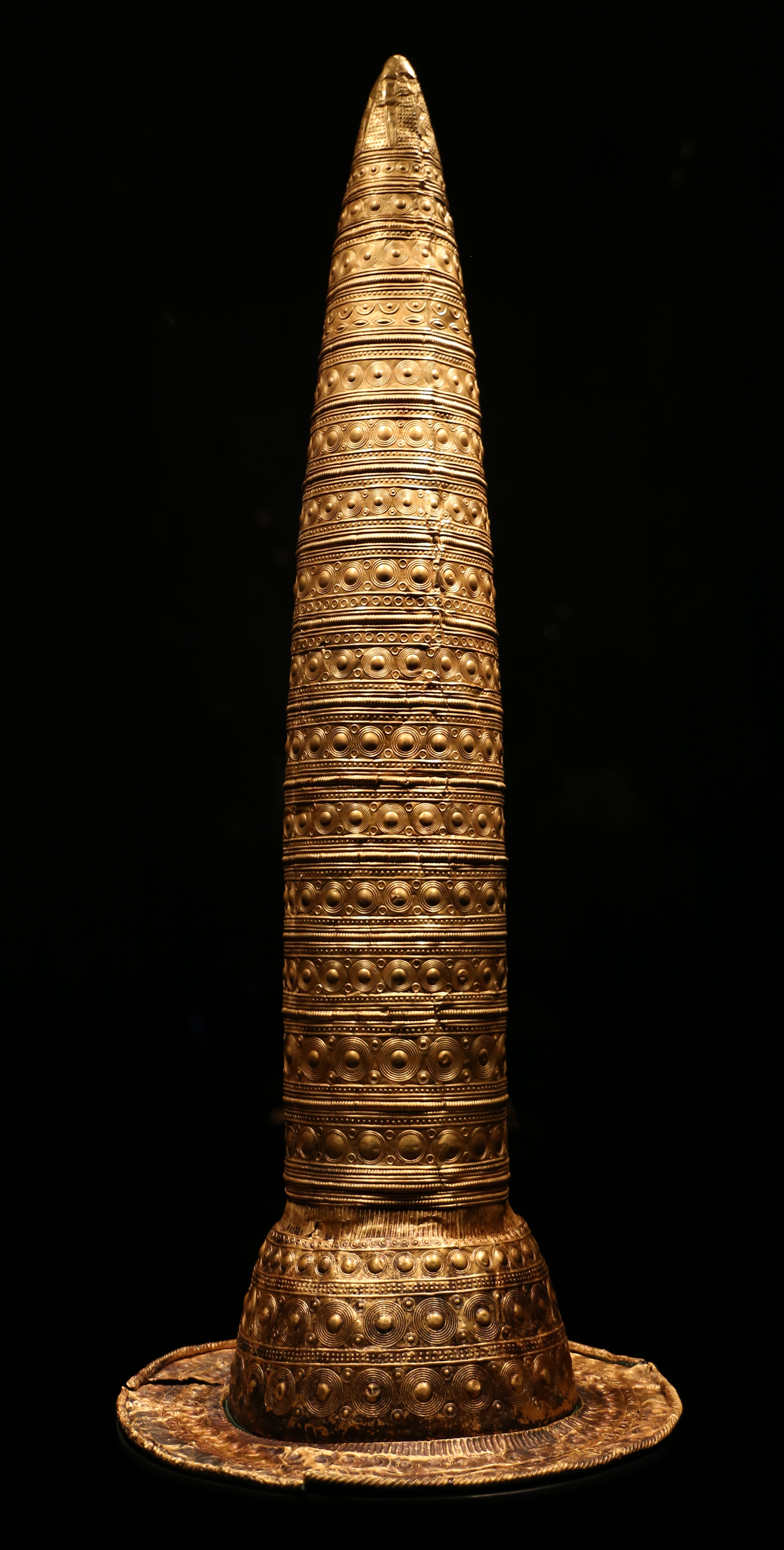
Berlin Gold Hat, Germany, c. 1000 BC

Four elaborate cone-shaped hats made from thin sheets of gold have been found in Germany and France dating from c. 1500-800 BC (the Tumulus culture to Urnfield period). They may have been worn as ceremonial hats by individuals described by researchers as "king-priests" or oracles.

The gold hats are covered in bands of ornaments or symbols along their whole length and extent. The symbols – mostly disks and concentric circles, sometimes wheels, crescents, pointed oval shapes and triangles – were punched using stamps, rolls or combs. The discs and concentric circles are interpreted as solar and possibly lunar symbols.

=== Calendar ===
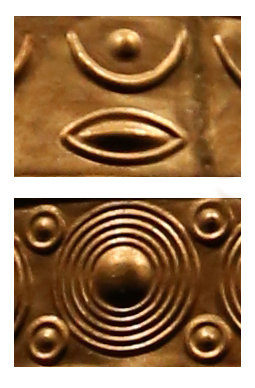
Symbols on the Berlin Hat

An analysis of the Berlin Gold Hat found that the symbols numerically encode a lunisolar calendar based on the 19-year Metonic cycle. According to Wilfried Menghin "The symbols on the hat are a logarithmic table which enables the movements of the sun and the moon to be calculated in advance." Similar information is thought to be encoded on the hats from Ezelsdorf-Buch, Schifferstadt and Avanton.

According to the Neues Museum the Berlin Gold Hat could also be used to predict lunar eclipses. Astronomers Rahlf Hansen and Christine Rink have argued that the Berlin hat encodes knowledge of Saros lunar eclipse cycles. Evidence for knowledge of these cycles is also known from the later Hallstatt period.

The various ornaments on the Berlin hat include a band of 19 'star and crescent' symbols, placed above 19 pointed-oval symbols which are thought to represent the planet Venus. Similar 'Venus' symbols are found on the gold hats from Ezelsdorf-Buch and Schifferstadt. According to some researchers a Venus calendar is encoded on the gold hats. The apex of the Berlin Gold Hat is also decorated with an 8-pointed star, which was a symbol of the planet Venus and the goddess Ishtar in ancient Mesopotamia, representing the 8-year Venus cycle.

Circular symbols similar to those on the gold hats are also found on gold bowls dating from the Middle to Late Bronze Age, including those from the Eberswalde hoard. Some of these are thought to contain calendrical information.

Astronomical and calendrical interpretations have been proposed for a variety of other decorated artefacts dating from the Middle to Late Bronze Age, including gold artefacts from the Bullenheimer Berg in Germany, a gold diadem from Velem in Hungary, gold appliqués from Lake Bled in Slovenia, gold discs and a gold belt from the Czech Republic, the Trundholm Sun Chariot from Denmark, bronze discs from Germany and Denmark, and bronze urns from Germany, Denmark and Poland (including Seddin, Gevelinghausen and Herzberg).

The gold hats and diadems have been linked to the Casco de Leiro from Spain and the Comerford Crown from Ireland, as well as to gold diadems from Mycenae in Greece, all of which bear similar symbols.

In his analysis of the Velem diadem, archaeologist Gabor Ilon writes: "high-ranking members of the elite in Bronze Age Europe were proud owners of gold foil-covered costume adornments and symbols of status and power as well as of golden vessels, objects of social display, decorated with an identical set of symbols ... embodying what was presumably an identical and coherent spiritual background." According to the Musée d'Archaeologie Nationale, "these precious and remarkably executed objects evoke a complex society, undoubtedly strictly hierarchical, with advanced technical and astronomical knowledge, organized around work in the fields".

Gold diadem and discs from Velem, Hungary, 14th-9th centuries BC.

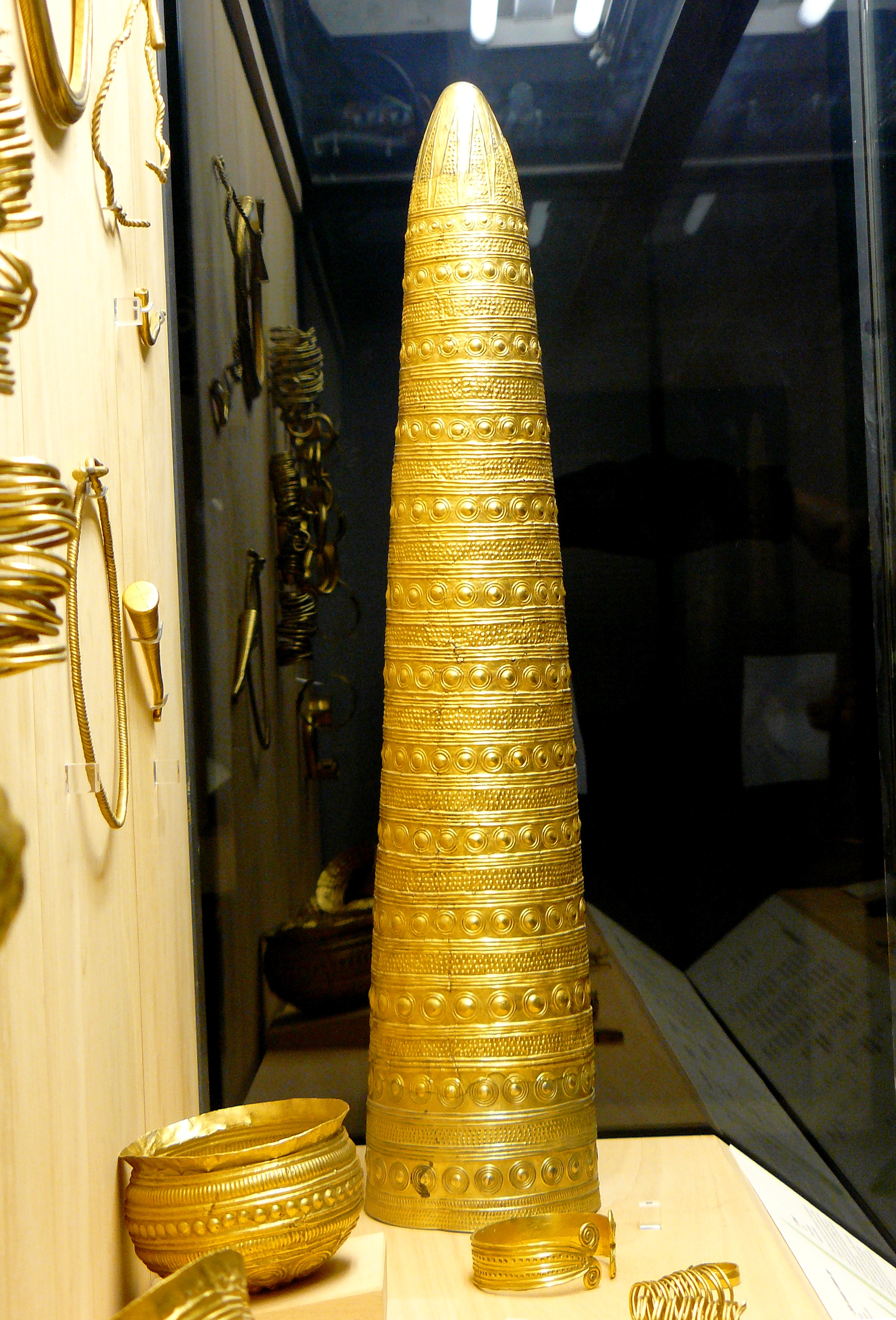
Avanton Gold Hat, France, 1500-1200 BC

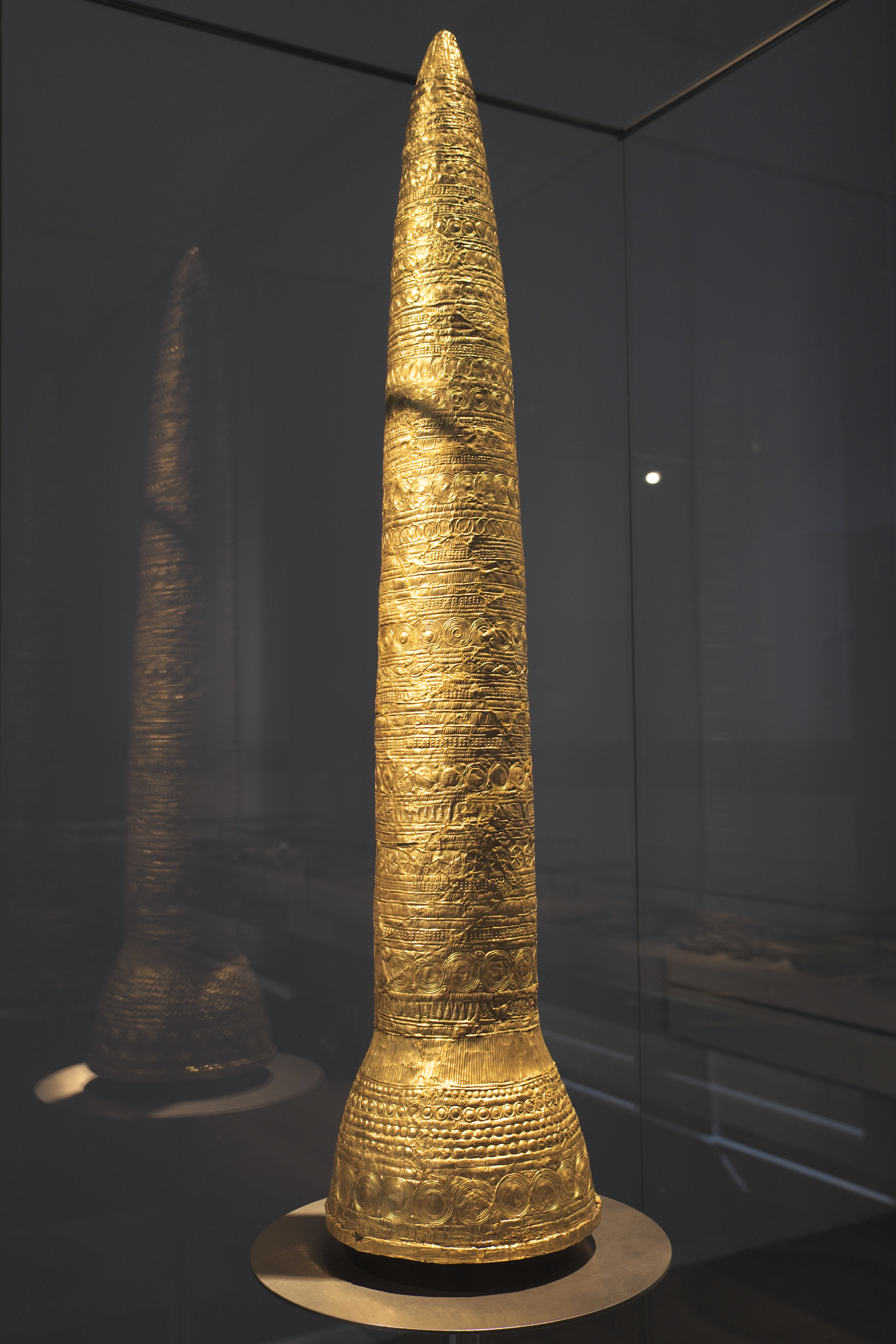
Ezelsdorf-Buch Gold Hat, Germany, c. 1000 BC

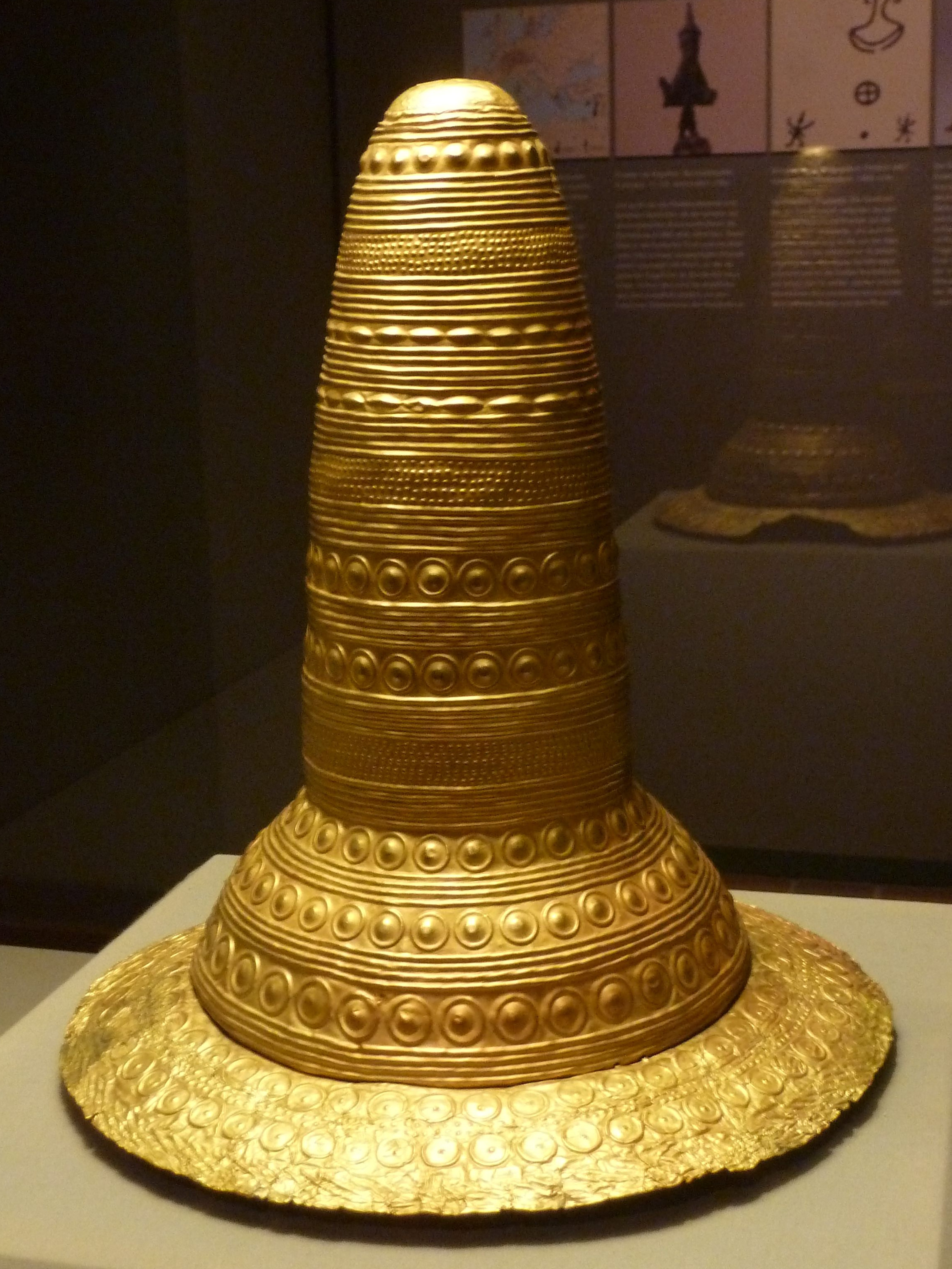
Schifferstadt Gold Hat, Germany, 1400-1300 BC

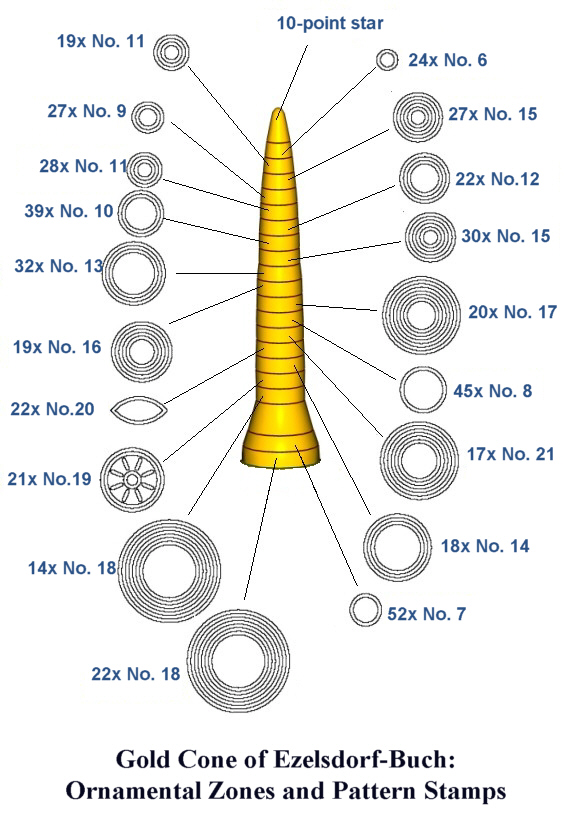
Ezelsdorf-Buch, schematic depiction of ornamention and stamps

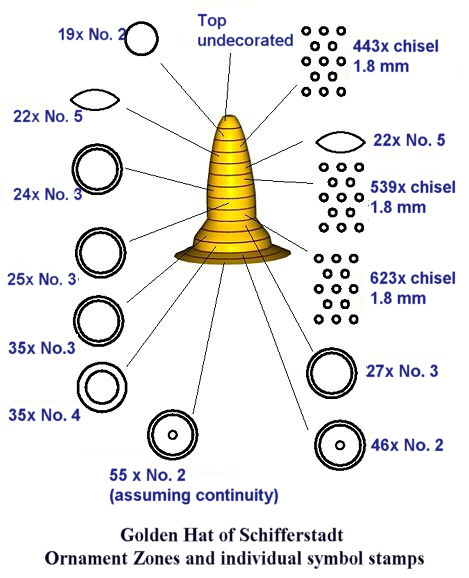
Schifferstadt, schematic depiction of ornamention and stamps

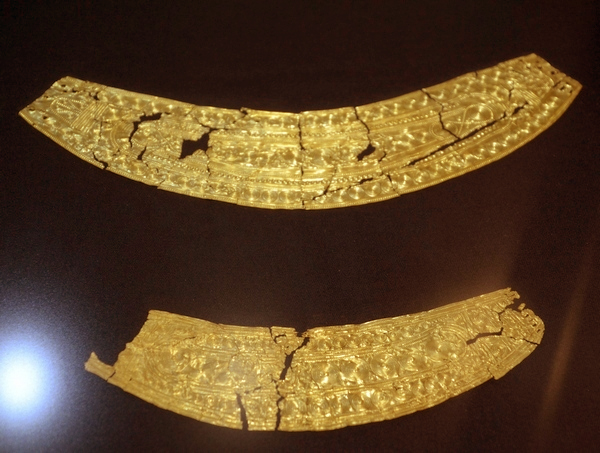
Gold appliqués from Lake Bled, Slovenia, 13th-12th century BC.

== Funerary customs ==
=== Graves ===
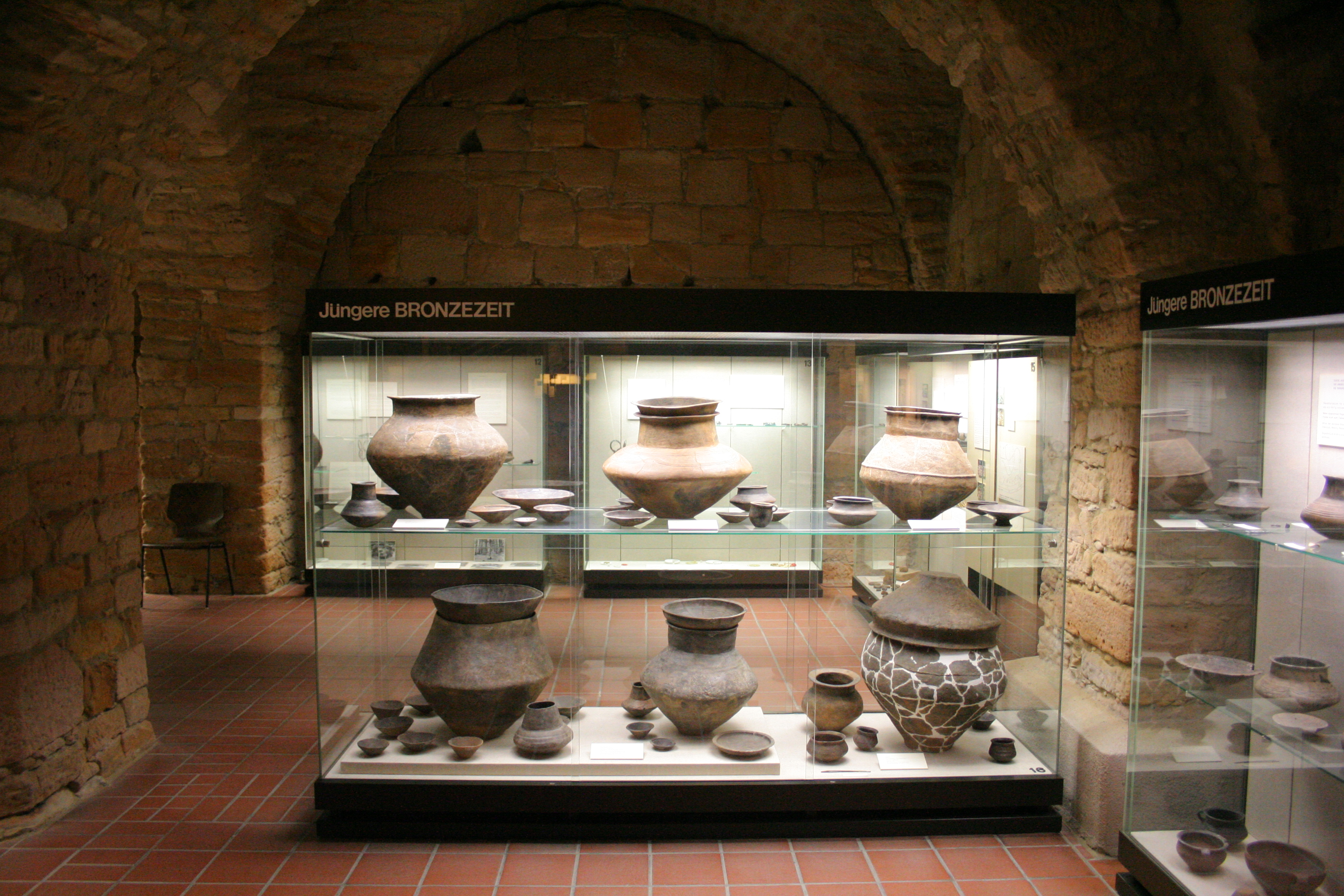
Urns for ashes and dishes for grave offerings, Germany.

In the Tumulus period, multiple inhumations under barrows were common, at least for the upper levels of society. In the Urnfield period, inhumation and burial in single flat graves prevails, though some barrows exist.

In the earliest phases of the Urnfield period, man-shaped graves were dug, sometimes provided with a stone lined floor, in which the cremated remains of the deceased were spread. Only later, burial in urns became prevalent. Some scholars speculate that this may have marked a fundamental shift in people's beliefs or myths about life and the afterlife.

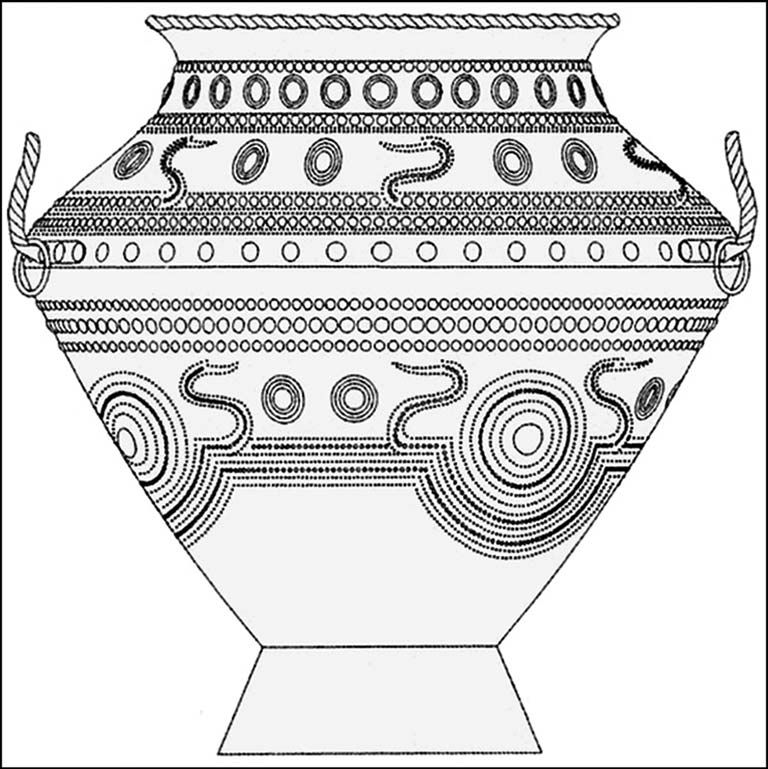
Bronze urn from Gevelinghausen (Germany) with sun-bird-ship motifs.

The size of the urnfields is variable. In Bavaria, they can contain hundreds of burials, while the largest cemetery in Baden-Württemberg in Dautmergen has only 30 graves. The dead were placed on pyres, covered in their personal jewellery, which often shows traces of the fire and sometimes food-offerings. The cremated bone-remains are much larger than in the Roman period, which indicates that less wood was used. Often, the bones have been incompletely collected.

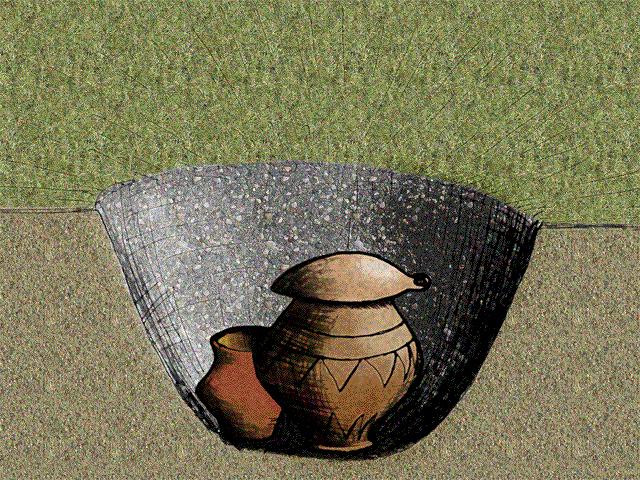
Typical burial of cremation urn.

Most urnfields are abandoned with the end of the Bronze Age, only the Lower Rhine urnfields continue in use in the early Iron Age (Ha C, sometimes even D).

The cremated bones could be placed in simple pits. Sometimes the dense concentration of the bones indicates a container of organic material, sometimes the bones were simply shattered.

If the bones were placed in urns, these were often covered by a shallow bowl or a stone. In a special type of burial (bell-graves) the urns are completely covered by an inverted larger vessel. As graves rarely overlap, they may have been marked by wooden posts or stones. Stone-pacing graves are typical of the Unstrut group.

=== Grave gifts ===
The urn containing the cremated bones is often accompanied by other, smaller ceramic vessels, like bowls and cups. They may have contained food. The urn is often placed in the centre of the assemblage. Often, these vessels have not been placed on the pyre. Metal grave gifts include razors, weapons that often have been deliberately destroyed (bent or broken), bracelets, pendants and pins. Metal grave gifts become rarer towards the end of the Urnfield culture, while the number of hoards increase. Burnt animal bones are often found, they may have been placed on the pyre as food. The marten bones in the grave of Seddin may have belonged to a garment (pelt). Amber or glass beads (Pfahlbautönnchen) are luxury items.

=== Upper-class graves ===
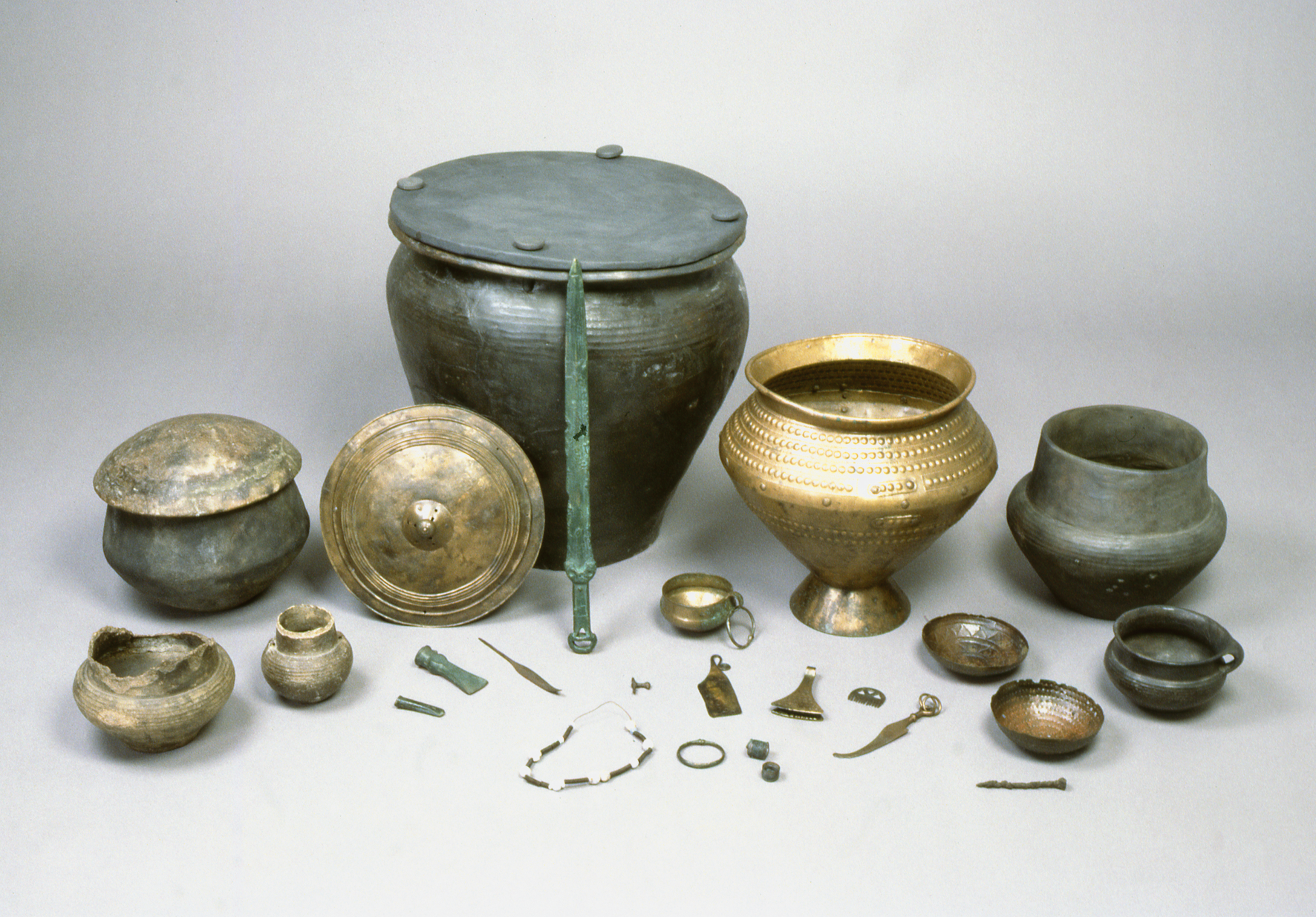
Seddin grave contents, 9th century BC, Germany.

Upper-class burials were placed in wooden chambers, rarely stone cists or chambers with a stone-paved floor and covered with a barrow or cairn. The graves contain especially finely made pottery, animal bones, usually of pigs, sometimes gold rings or sheets, and in exceptional cases miniature wagons. Some of these rich burials contain the remains of more than one person. In this case, women and children are normally seen as sacrifices. Until more is known about the status distribution and the social structure of the late Bronze Age, this interpretation should be viewed with caution, however. Towards the end of the Urnfield period, some bodies were burnt in situ and then covered by a barrow, reminiscent of the burial of Patroclus as described by Homer and the burial of Beowulf (with the additional ship burial element). The grave of Seddin (c. 9th century BC) has been described as a "Homeric burial" due to its close similarity to contemporary elite burials in Greece and Italy. In the early Iron Age, inhumation became the rule again.

== Cult ==
An obsession with waterbirds is indicated by numerous pictures and three-dimensional representations. Combined with the hoards deposited in rivers and swamps, it indicates religious beliefs connected with water. This has led some scholars to believe in serious droughts during the late Bronze Age. Sometimes the water-birds are combined with circles, the so-called sun-barque or solar boat motif. Moon-shaped clay firedogs or 'moon idols' are thought to have a religious significance, as well as crescent shaped razors.

The Goloring earthwork enclosure in Germany (c. 1200-800 BC) was a cult site with a possible calendar function, similar to earlier sites such as Pömmelte in Germany and Stonehenge in Britain with which it shares similar proportions and circular design.

The Kyffhäuser caves in Thuringia contain headless skeletons and animal bones that have been interpreted as sacrifices. Other deposits include grain, knotted vegetable fibres and hair and bronze objects (axes, pendants and pins). The Ith-caves (Lower Saxony) have yielded comparative material.

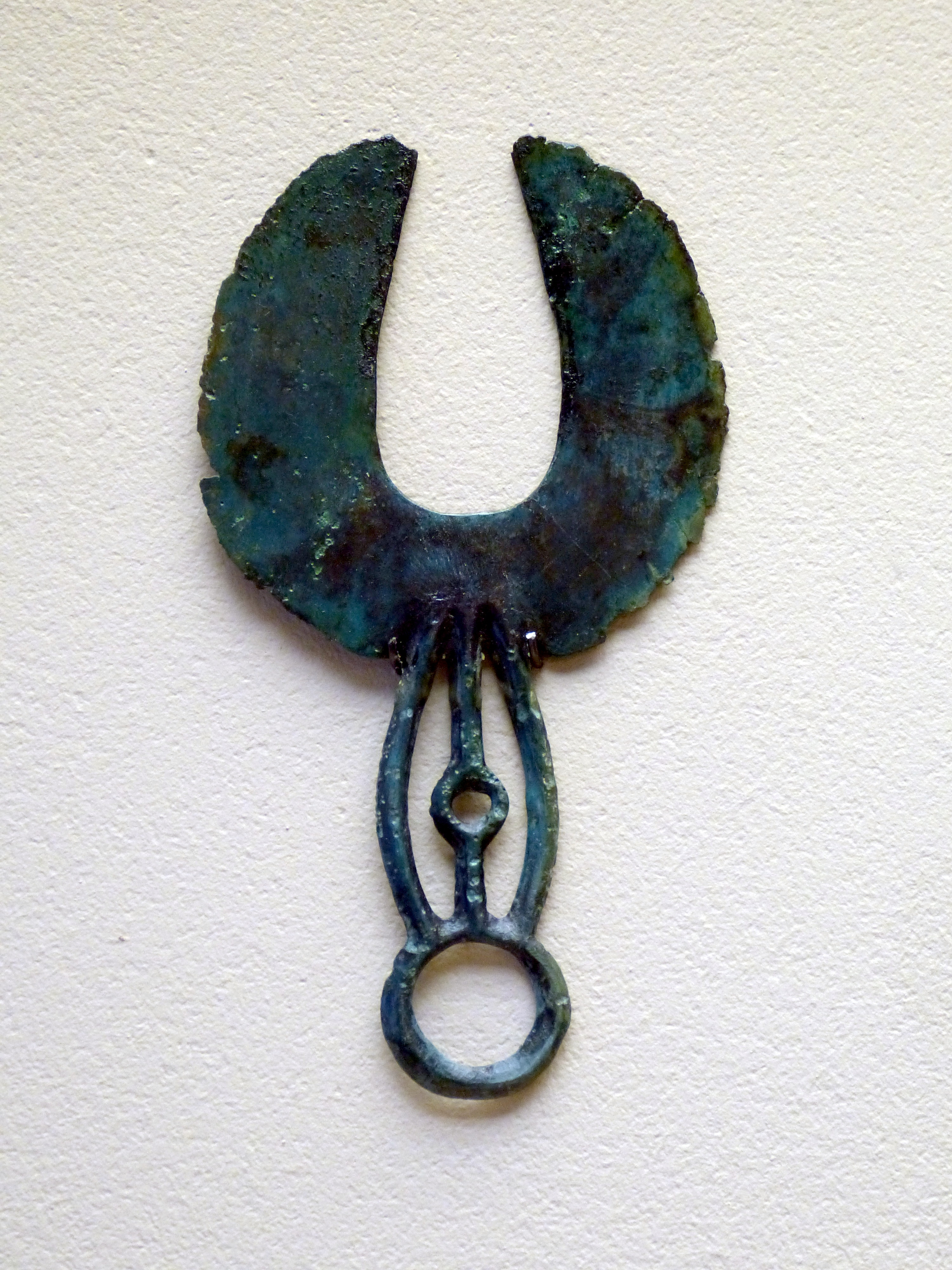
Crescent shaped razor, Germany

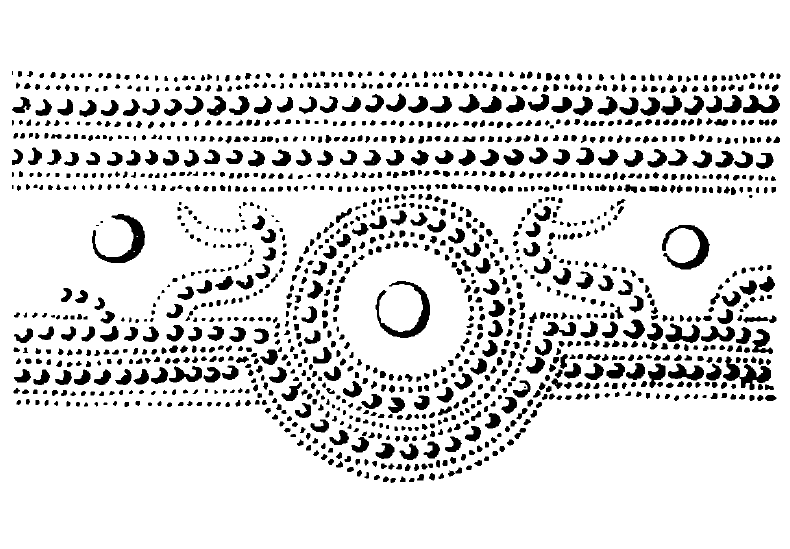
'Sun-bird-ship' motif from a bronze vessel, Hungary

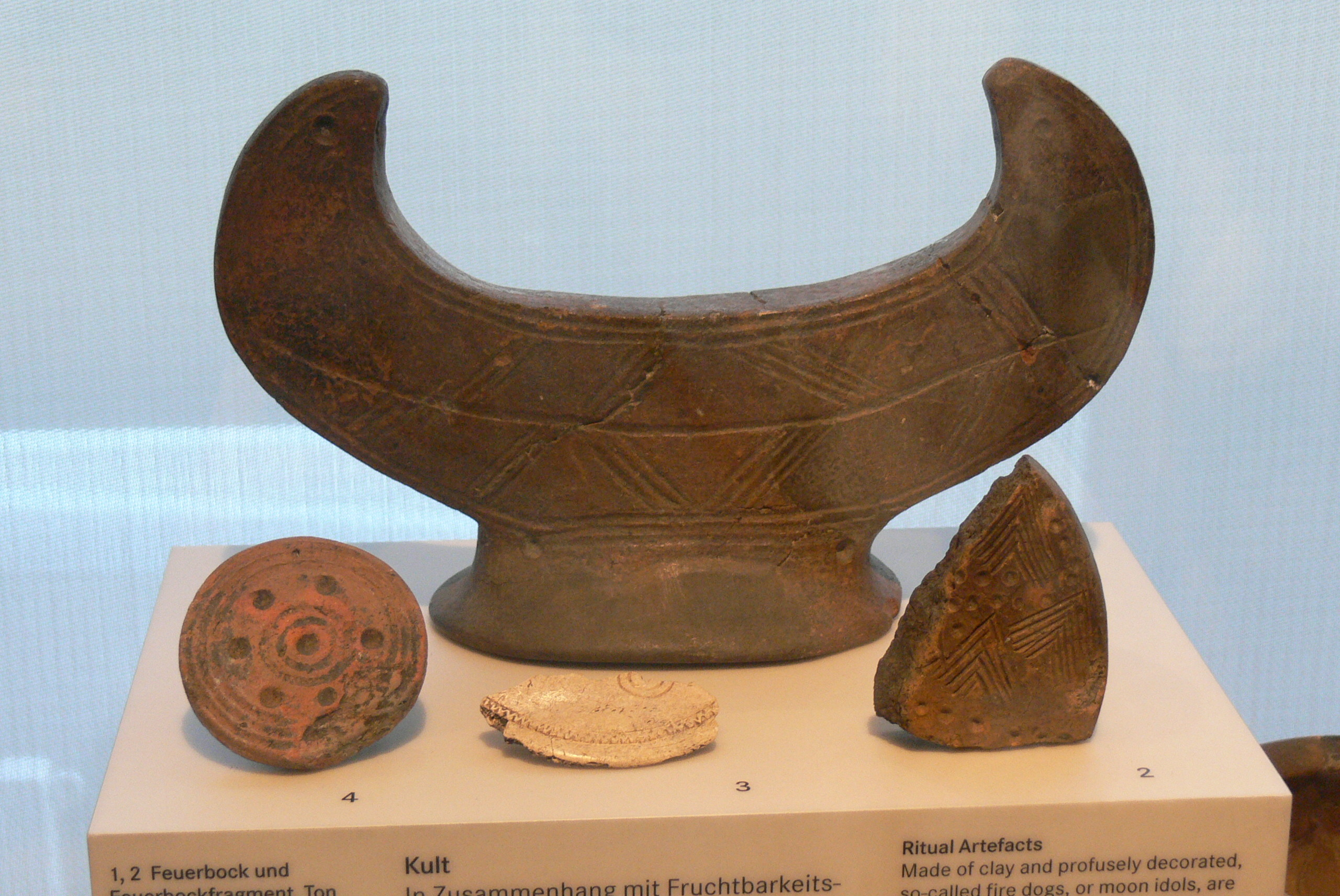
Crescent shaped fire-dog/ moon idol, Germany

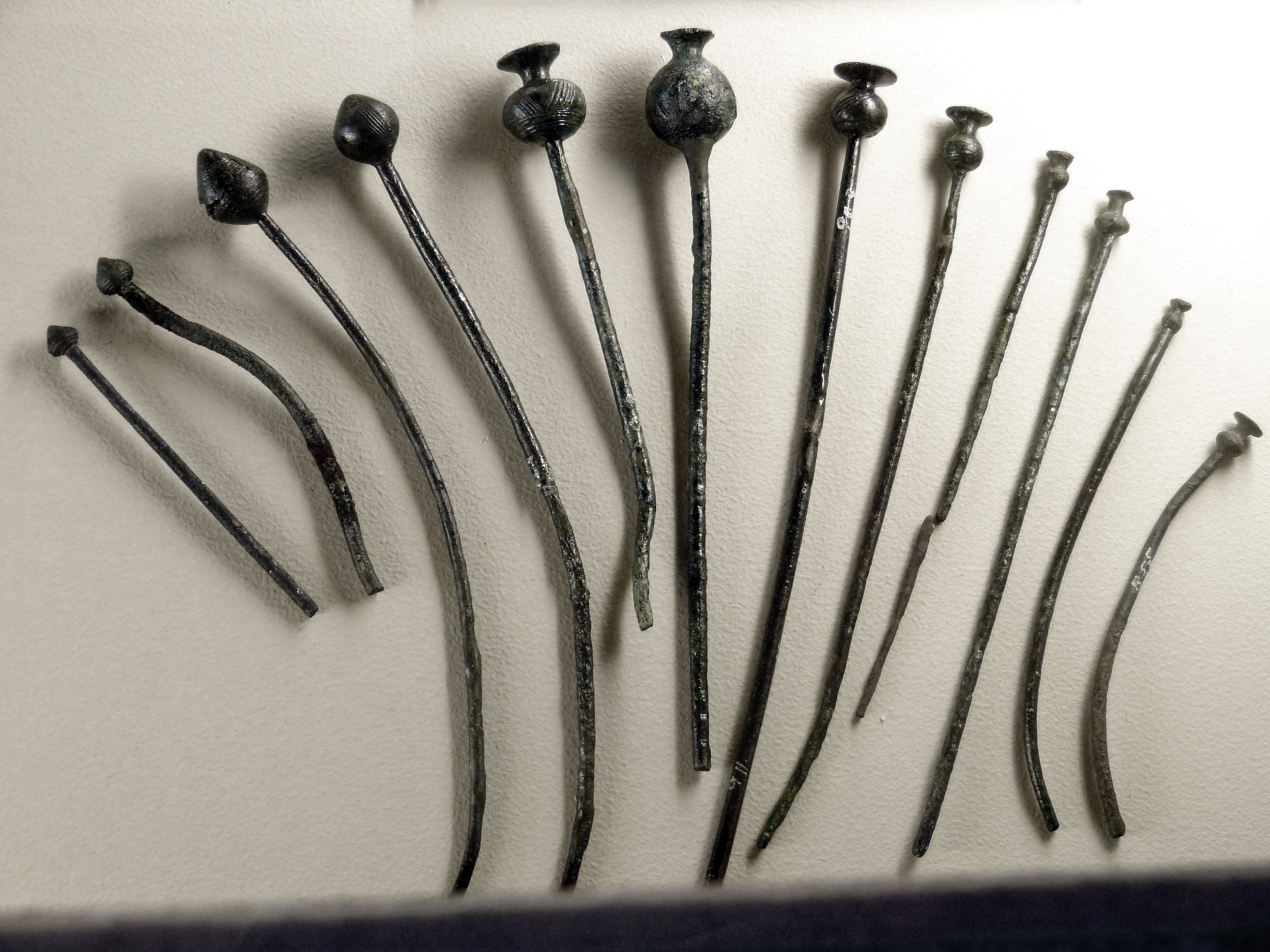
Opium-poppy-head pins, Germany

== Genetics ==
A genetic study published in Nature in March 2015 examined the remains of an Urnfield male buried in Halberstadt, Germany ca 1100-1000 BC. He was found to be a carrier of the paternal haplogroup R1a1a1b1a2 and the maternal haplogroup H23.

A genetic study published in Science in March 2019 found a significant increase in north-central European ancestry in Iberia during the transition from the Bronze Age to the Iron Age. The authors of the study suggested that the spread of the Urnfield culture was associated with this transition, during which the Celtiberians may have emerged. A Celtiberian male examined in the study was found to be a carrier of the paternal haplogroup I2a1a1a.

Studies have shown that the Urnfield culture is patrilocal.

Further archaeogenetic research has provided evidence for substantial paternal-line diversity among Urnfield-associated populations. In particular, individuals from the Knovíz culture, a central Bohemian subgroup of the Urnfield cultural complex, have been found to carry several Y-chromosomal haplogroups. These include R1b-L2 (six individuals), R1b-L151 (two), R1b-S497 (one), R1b-S1161 (one), R1a-Z280 (one), I2-L1229 (one), I2-Z2069 (one), and H-P96 (one).

Additional evidence comes from the Lichtenstein Cave in Lower Saxony, Germany, an Urnfield-associated burial site dating to around 1000 BC. Of the 19 male individuals recovered from the cave, 15 yielded sufficient Y-chromosomal STR data for haplogroup assessment. Twelve were assigned to I2b2, two to R1a, and one to R1b, while three could not be determined. The Lichtenstein assemblage is therefore another example of the coexistence of several paternal lineages within a single Urnfield-associated community.

Genome-wide data from northeastern Iberia provide additional evidence for the genetic complexity of Urnfield-associated populations. A 2025 study of 24 individuals from the Late Bronze Age site of Los Castellets II, an Urnfield-associated settlement, found ancestry derived from both local Iberian Bronze Age populations and populations related to Central European Bronze Age groups with higher levels of steppe-related ancestry. The male individuals from the site belonged to R1b-P312, with the available data consistent with R1b-Z198 at different levels of resolution.

== Gallery ==
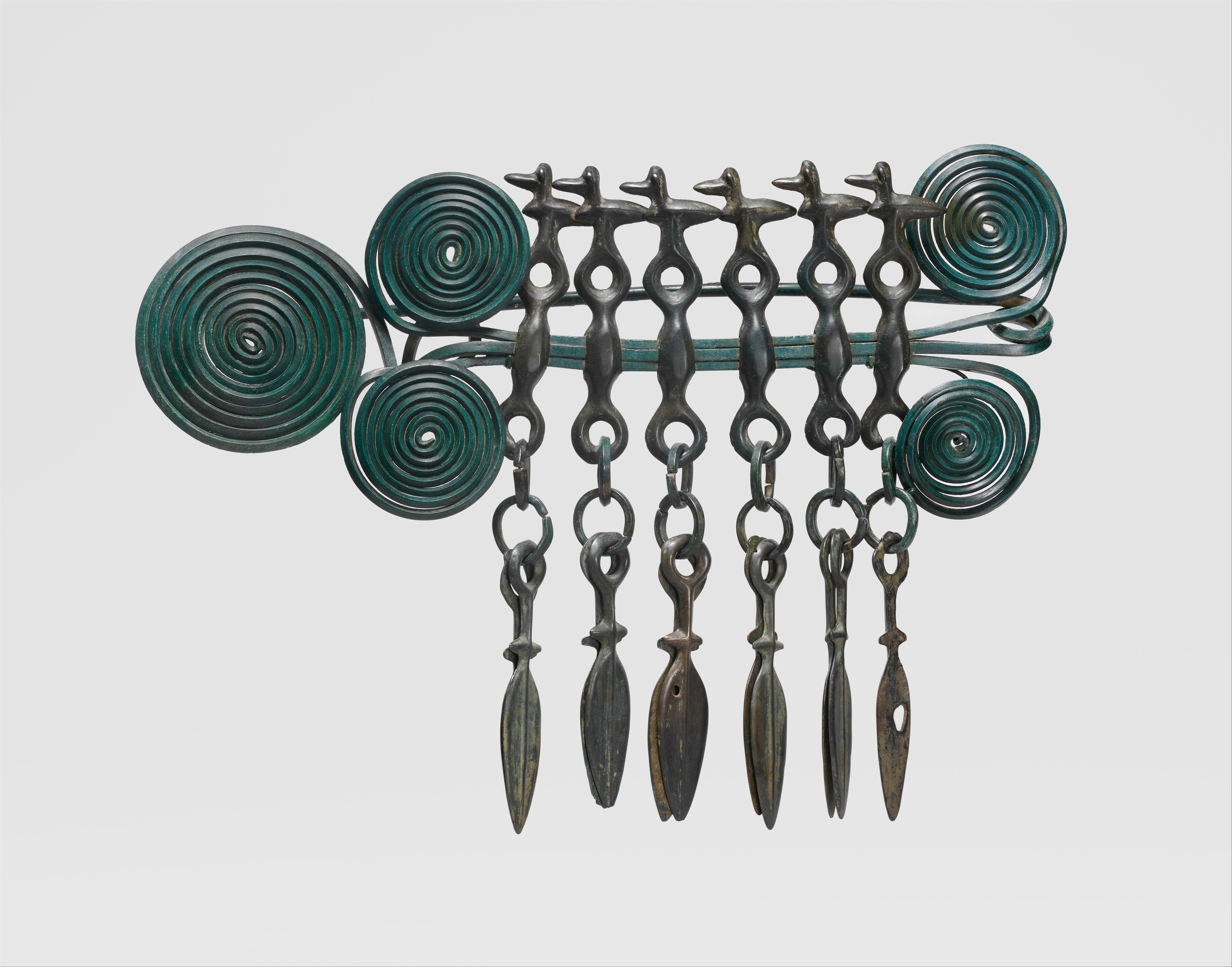
Large brooch, Germany, 1100–1000 BC

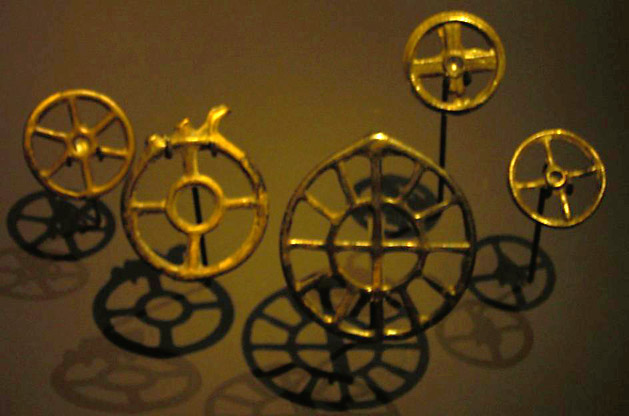
Bronze wheel pendants from Switzerland

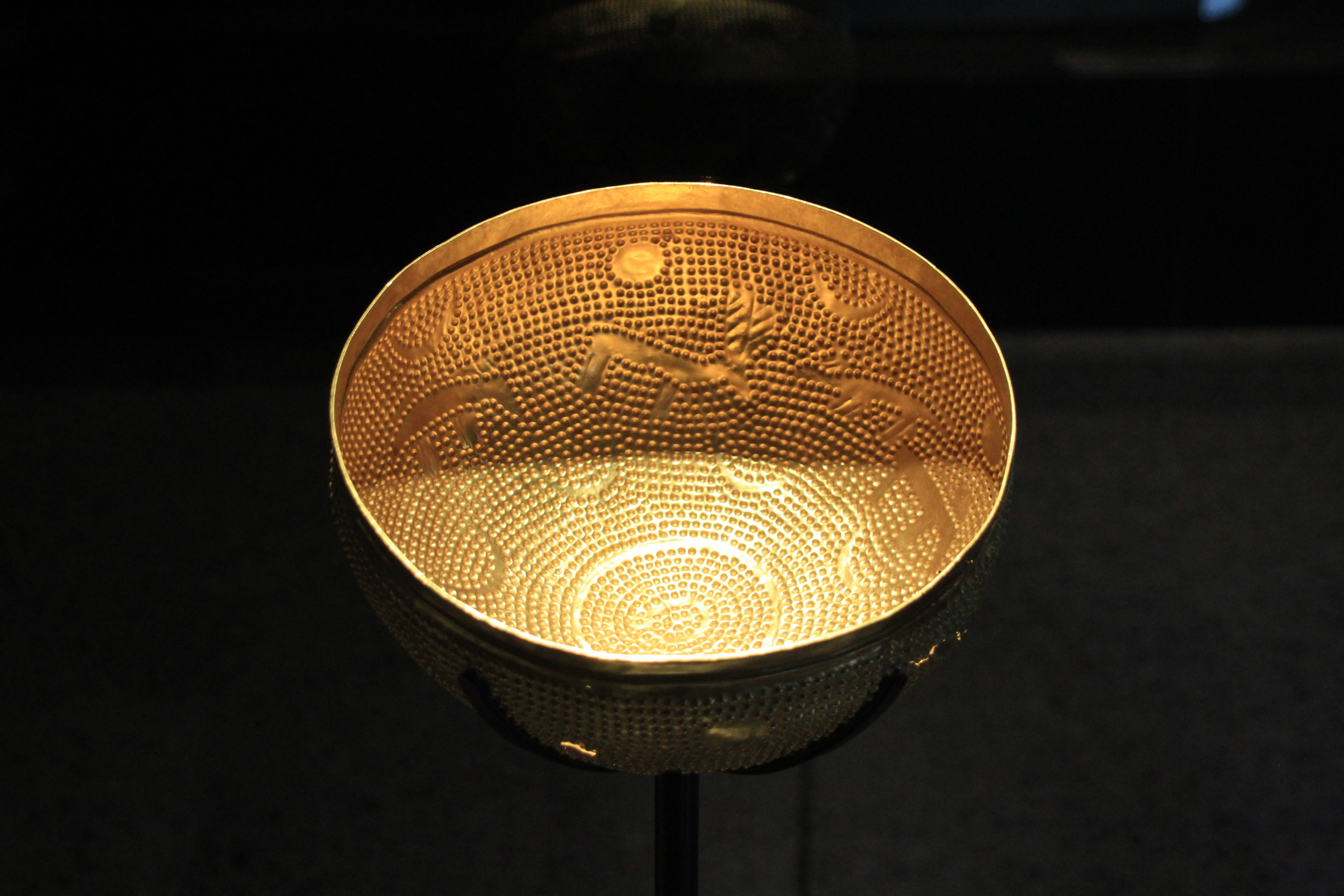
Gold bowl, Altstetten, Switzerland

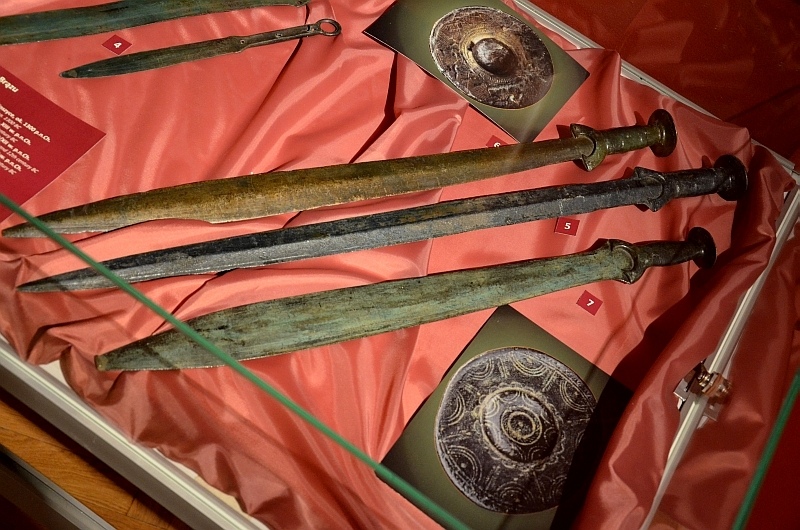
Naue II swords from Slovakia, 1200-1100 BC

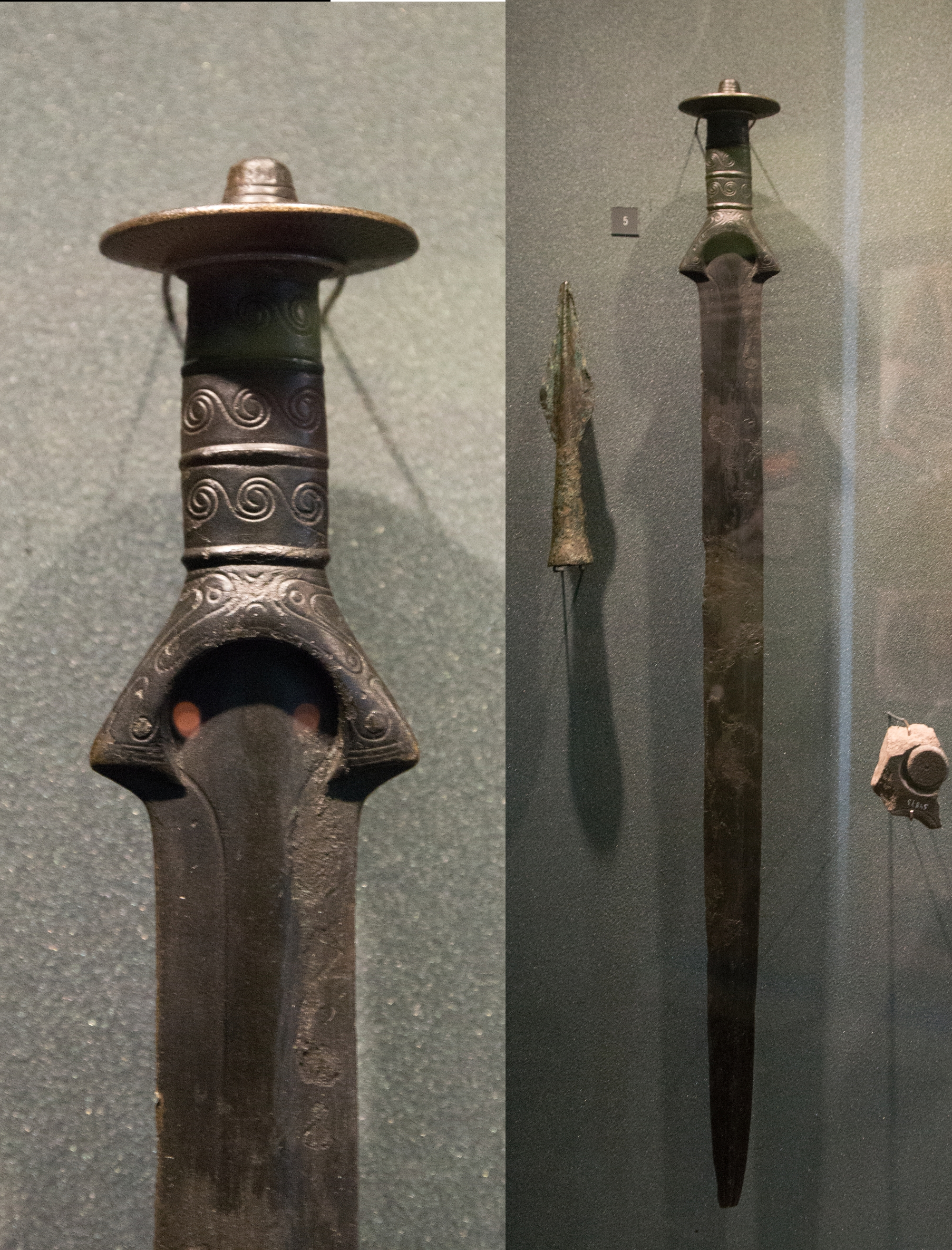
Bronze sword from the Czech Republic

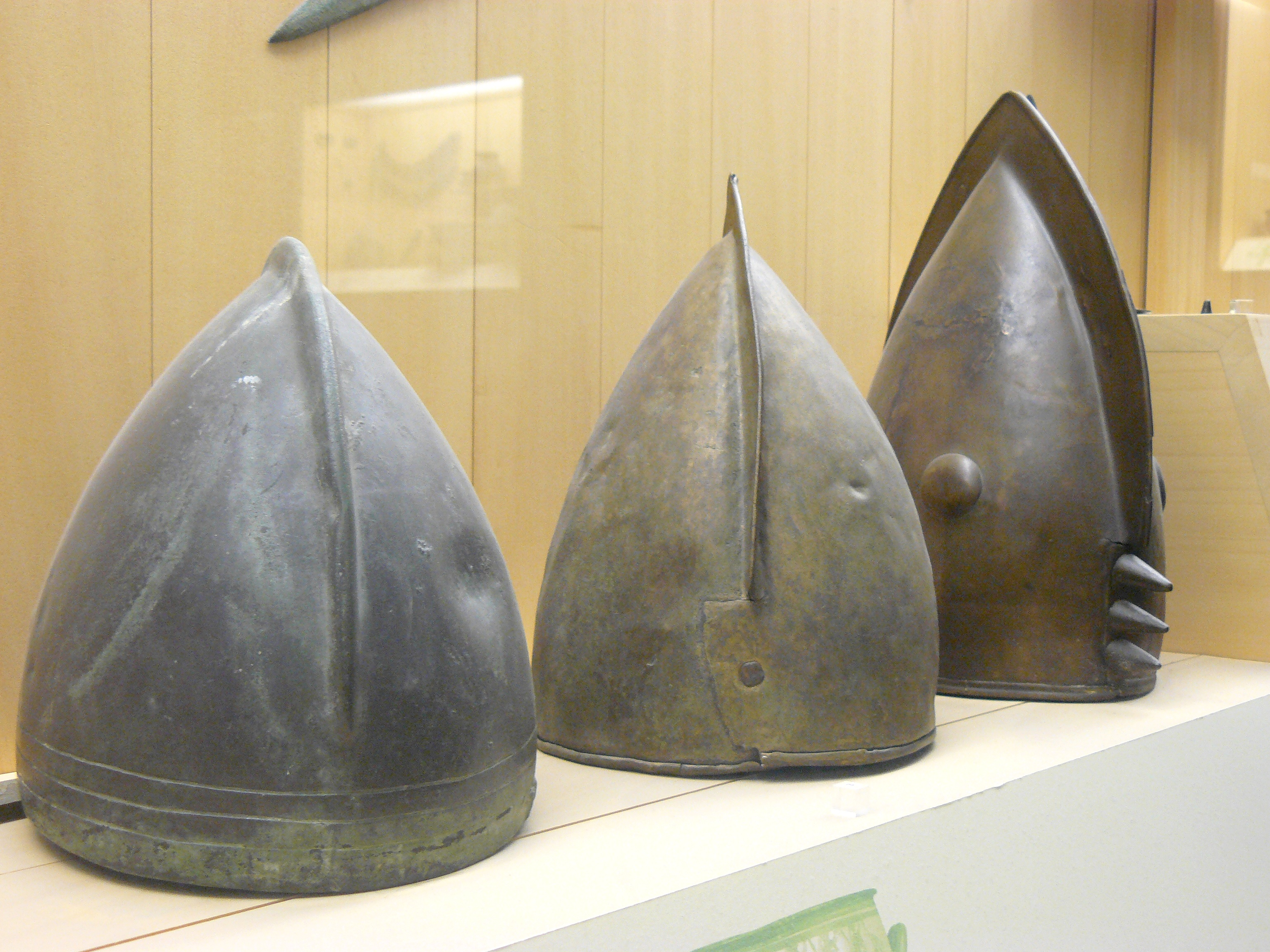
Bronze helmets from France, 1100-900 BC

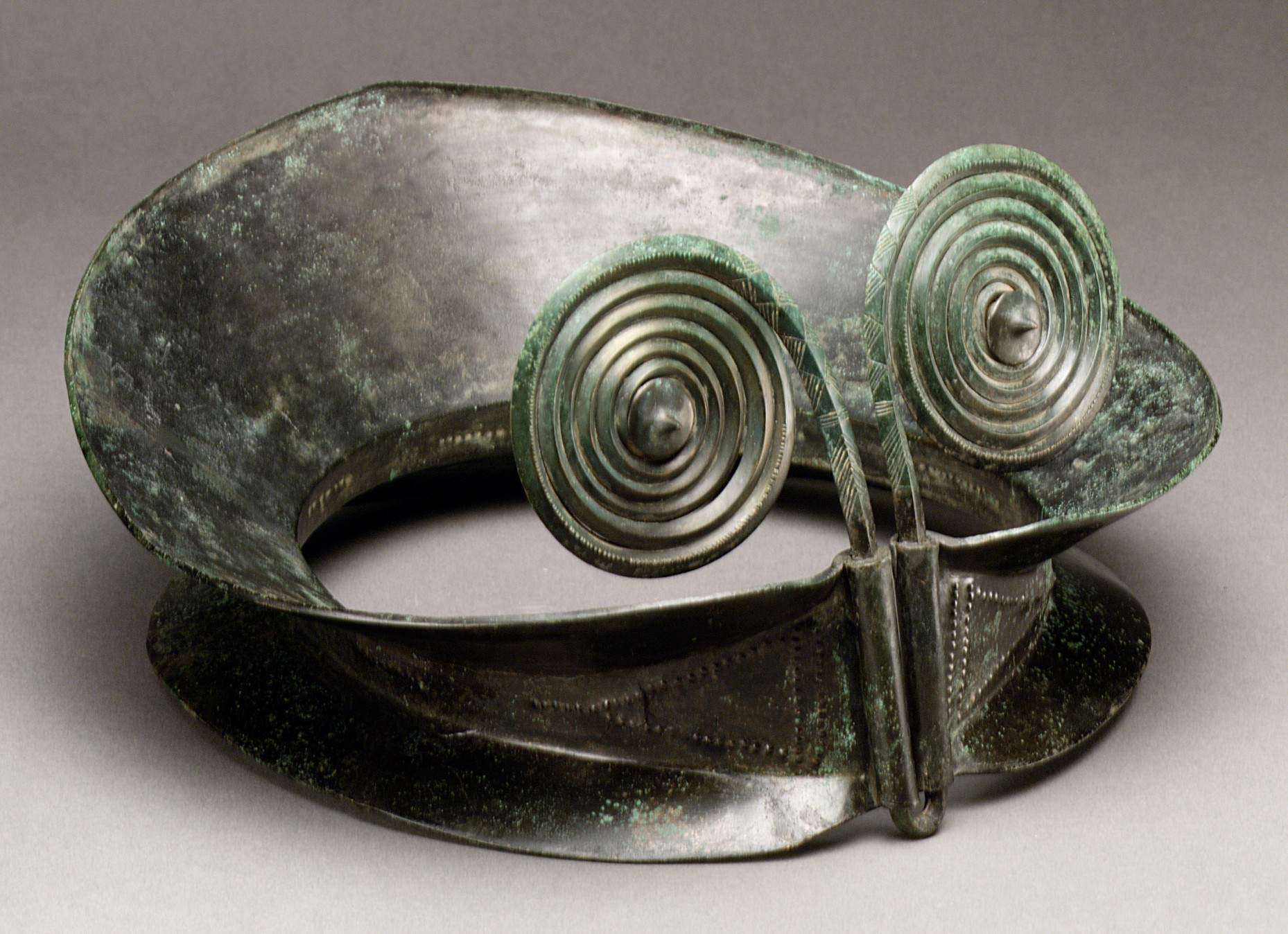
Bronze diadem, Hungary, c. 1200 BC

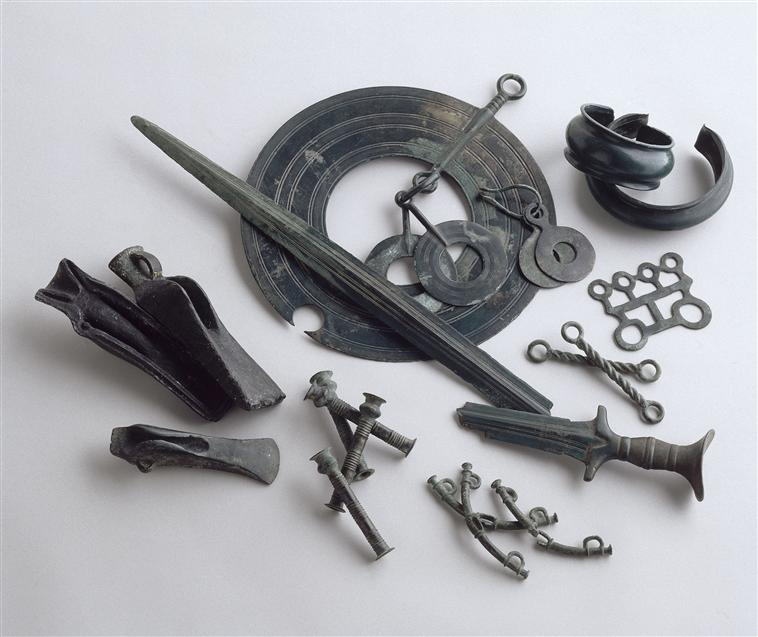
Vaudrevange hoard, Germany

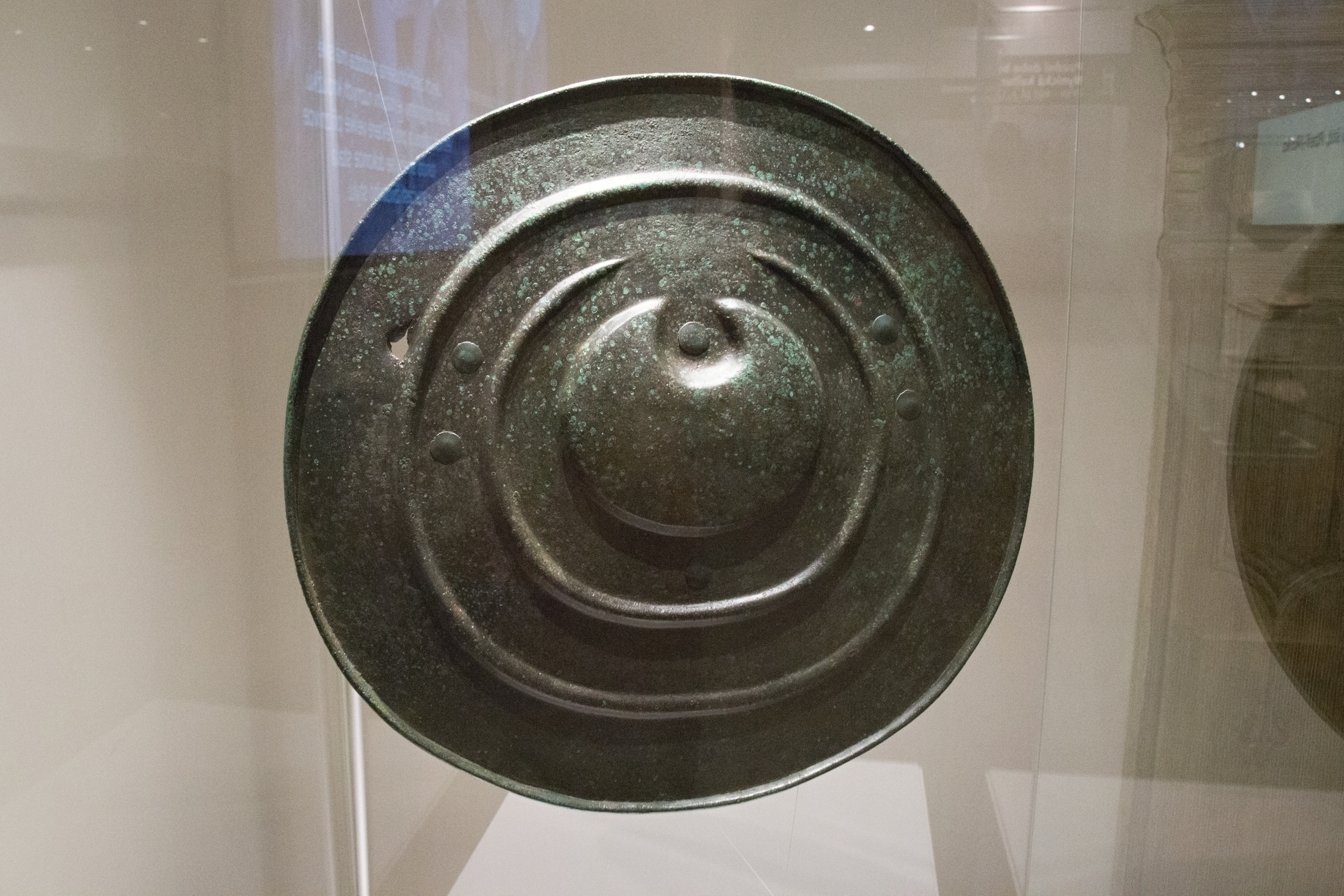
Bronze shield from the Czech Republic, c. 900 BC

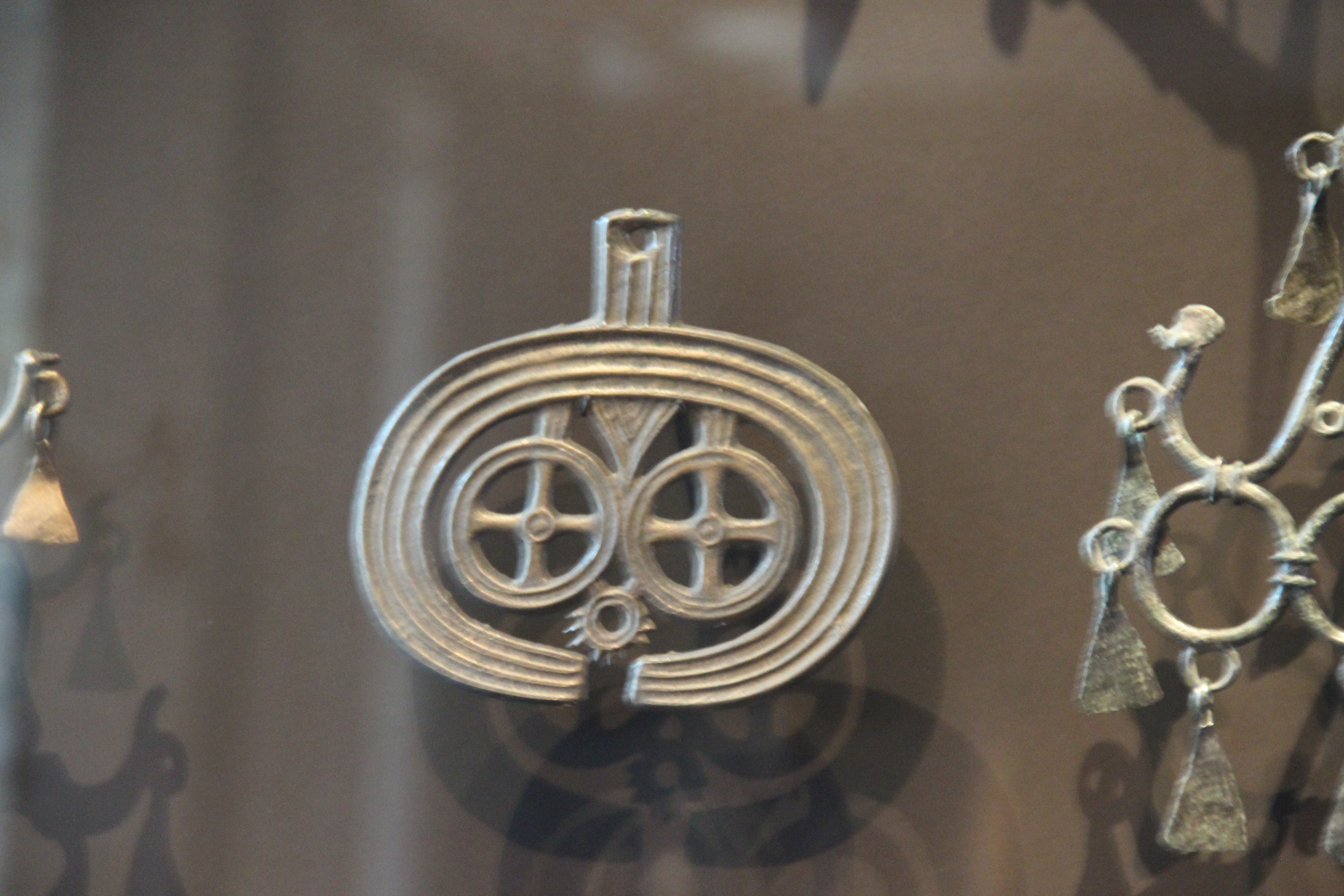
Bronze ornament, Slovakia, 13th c. BC

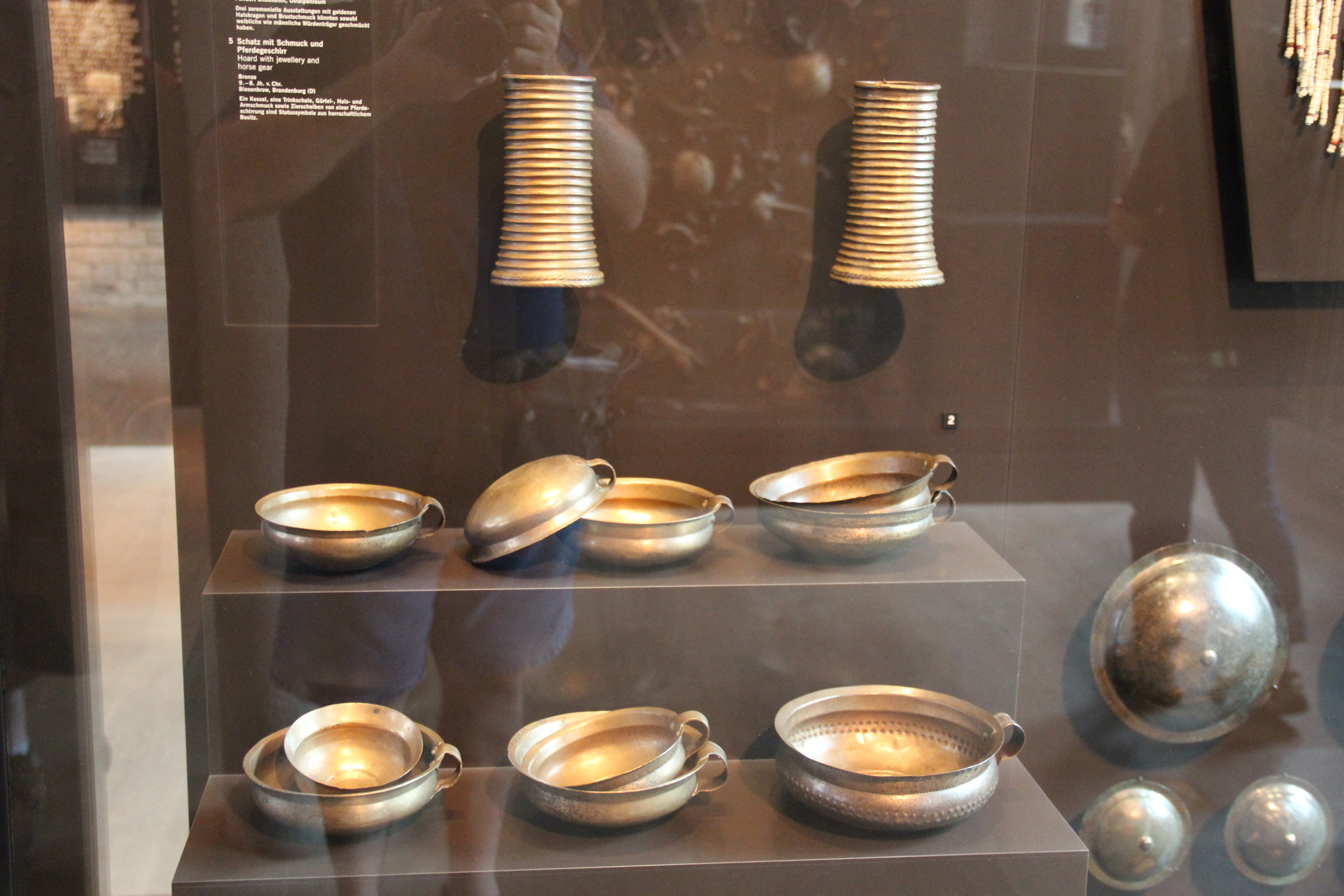
Hoard of bronze objects, Germany, 1000 BC.

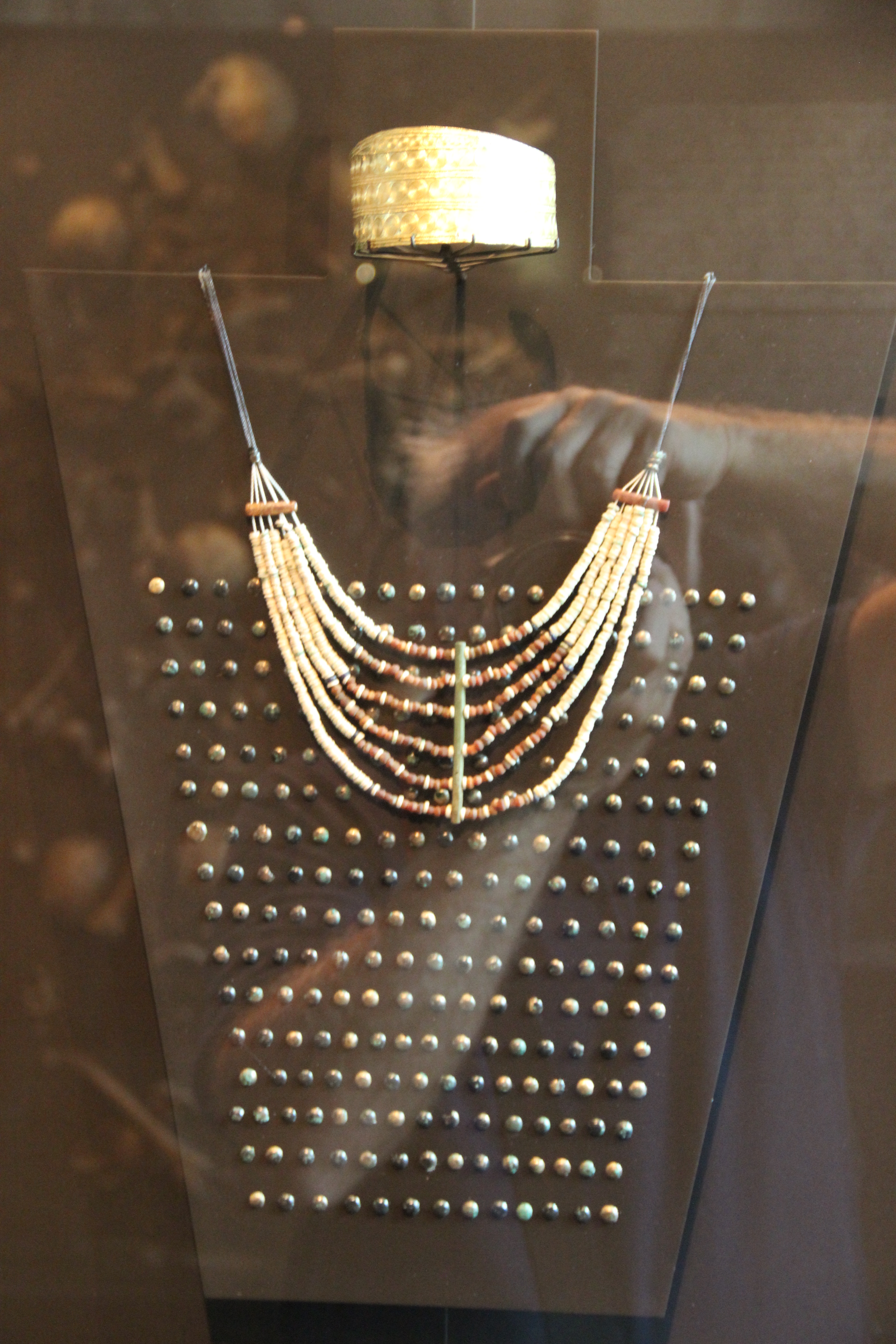
Gold collar & necklace, Austria, 900 BC.

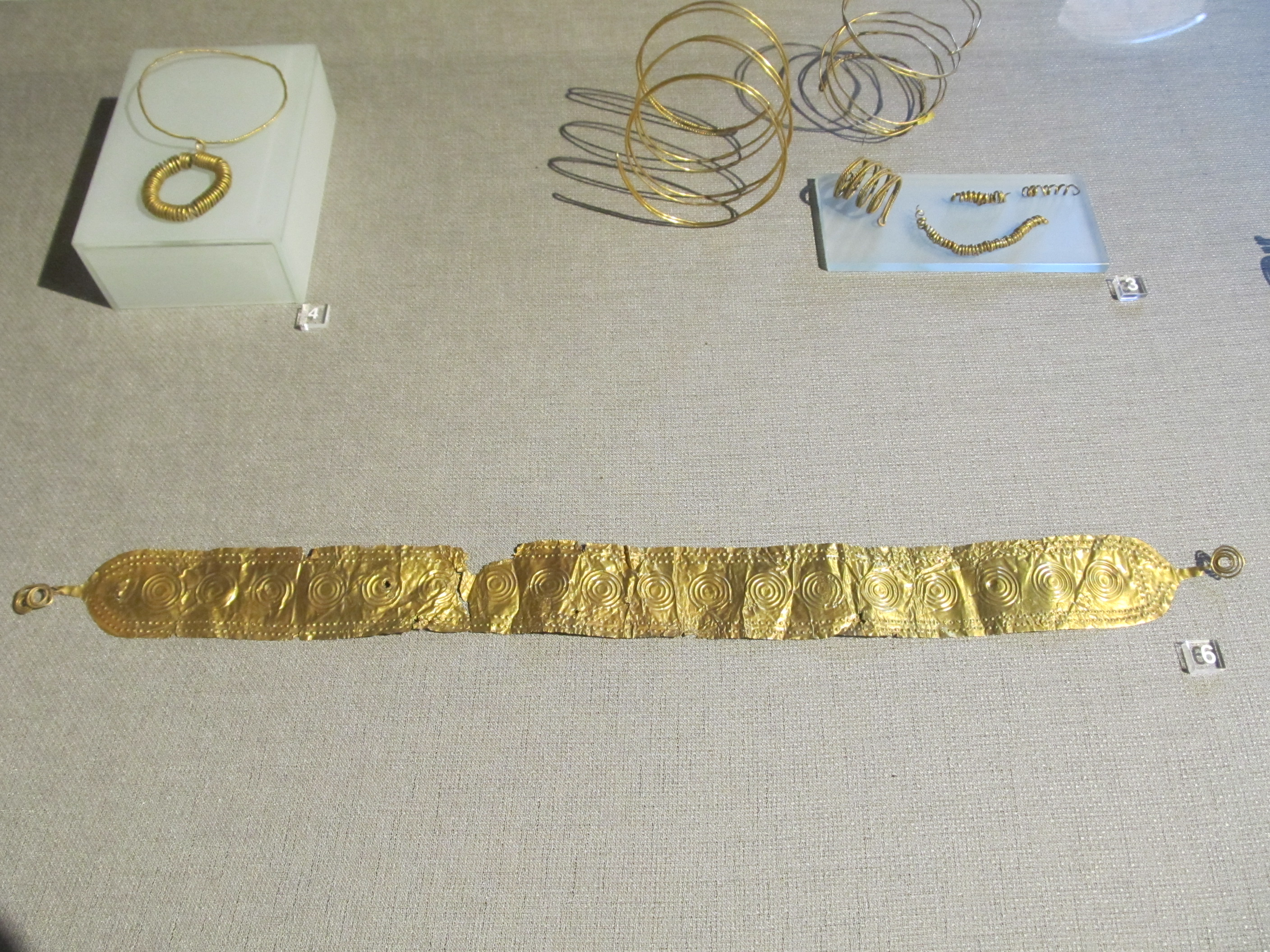
Gold diadem from Sichów, Poland

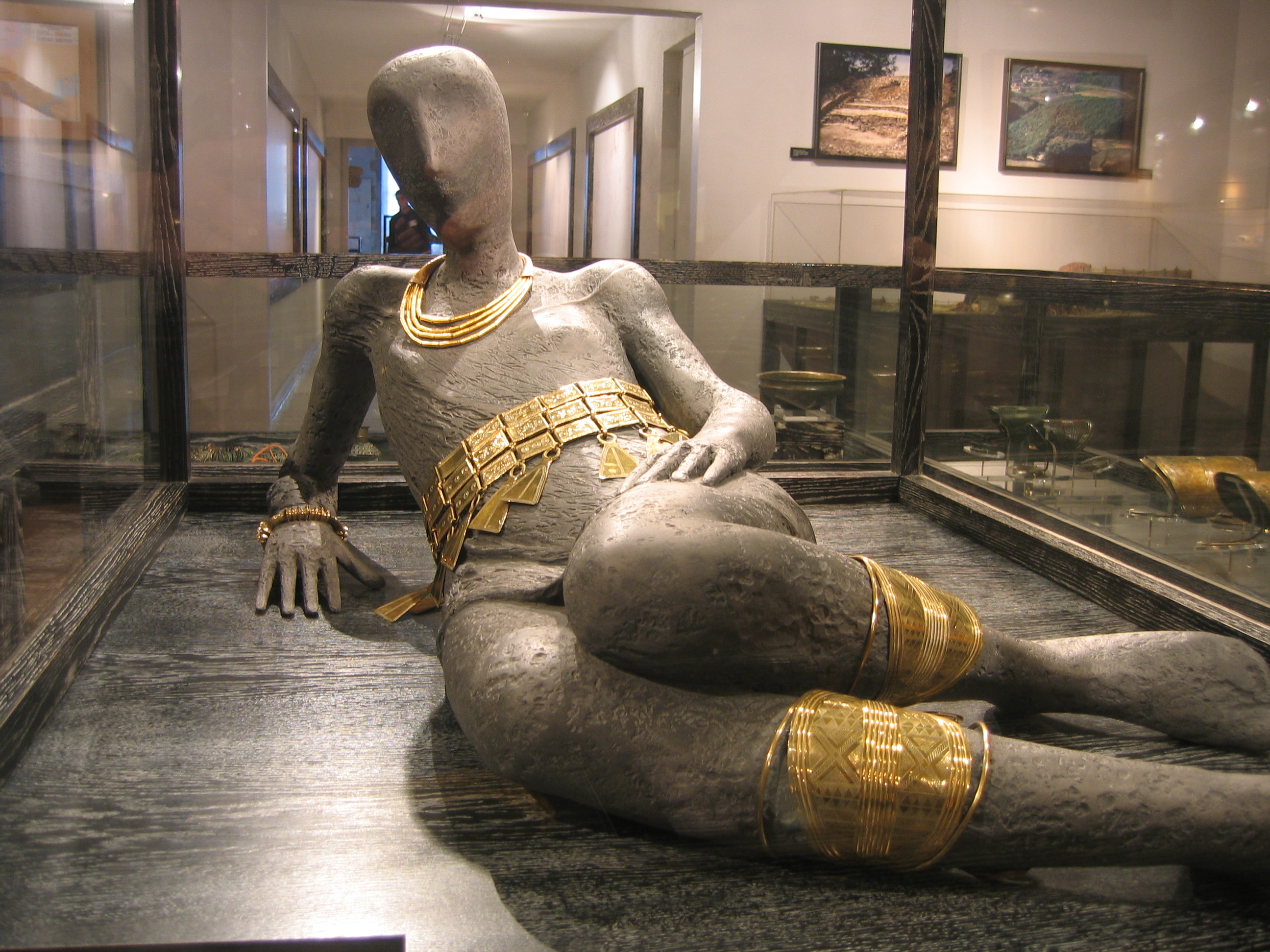
Bronze ornaments from Blanot, France, c. 1000 BC

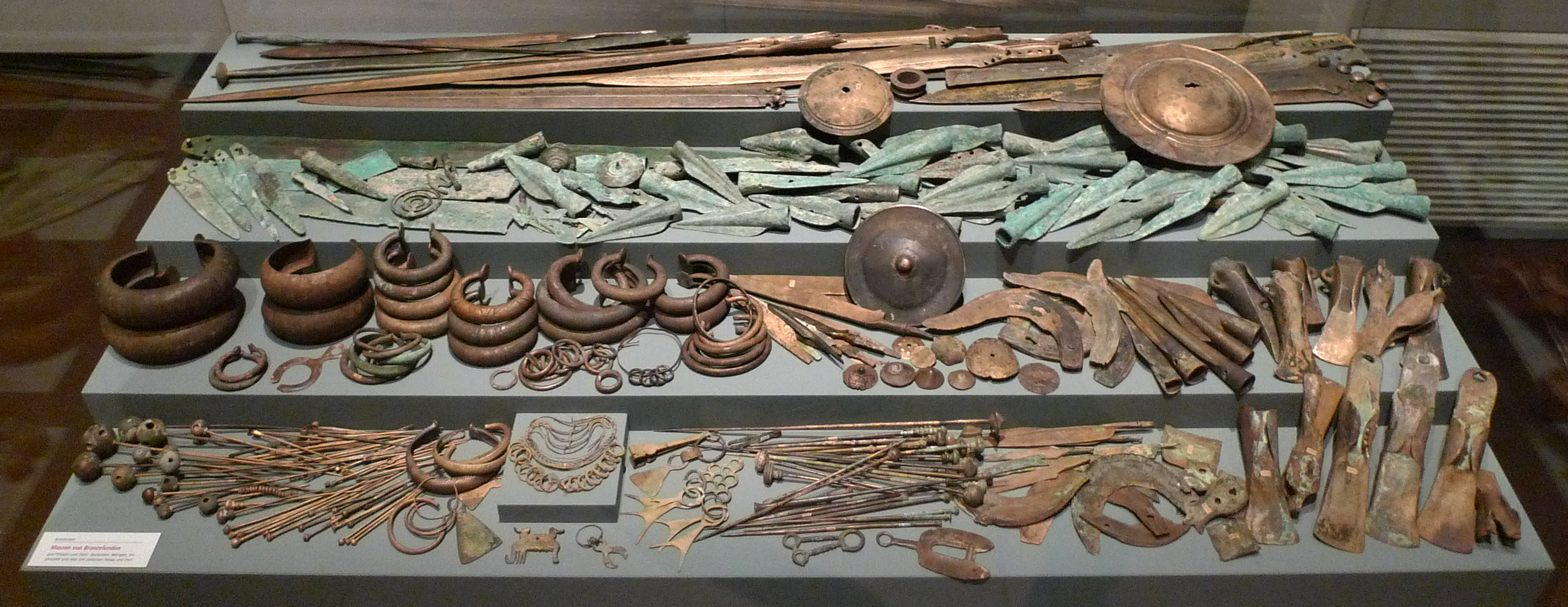
River and lake finds from Switzerland

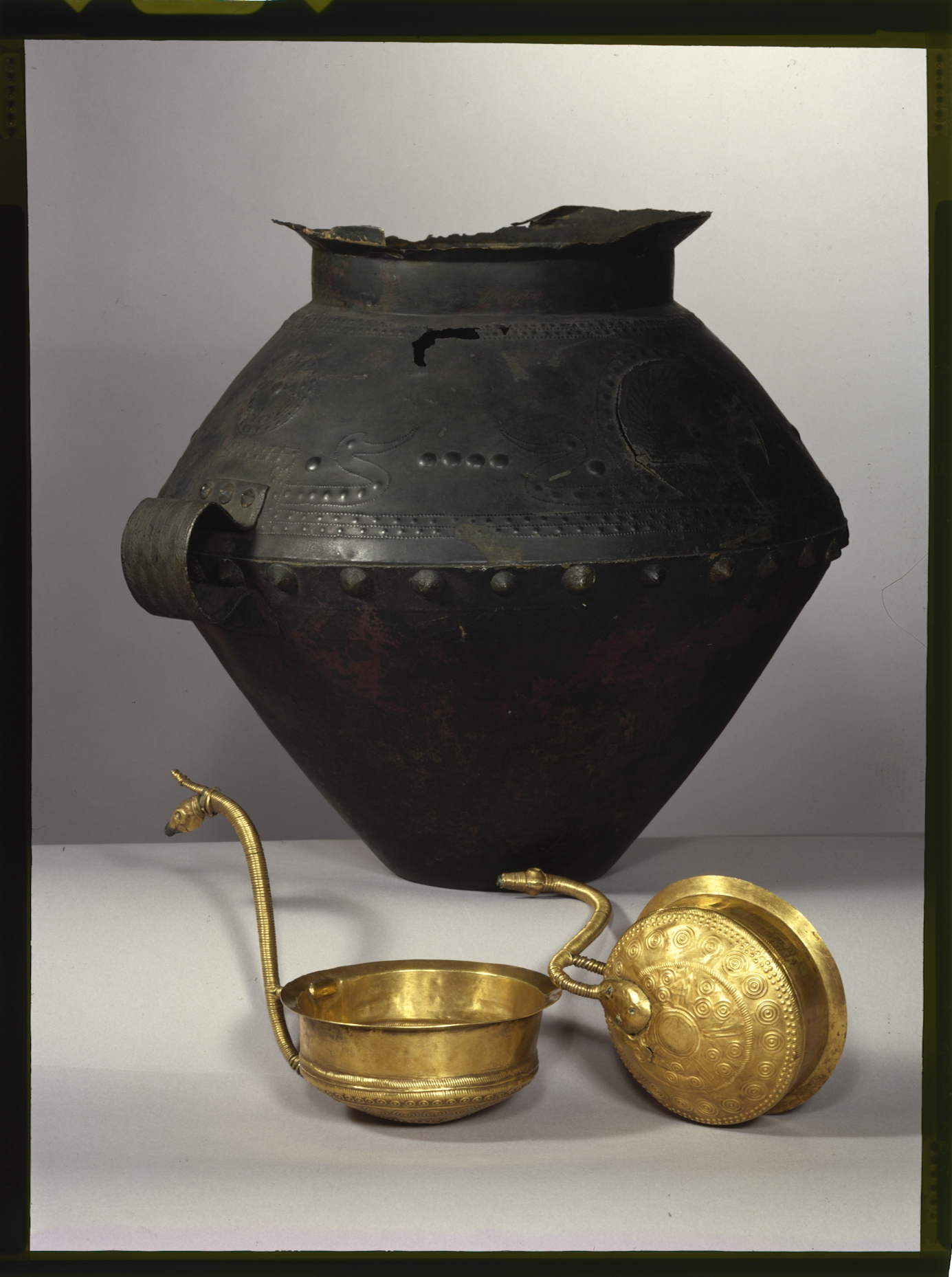
Urn with sun-bird-ship motif, Denmark, c. 1000-800 BC

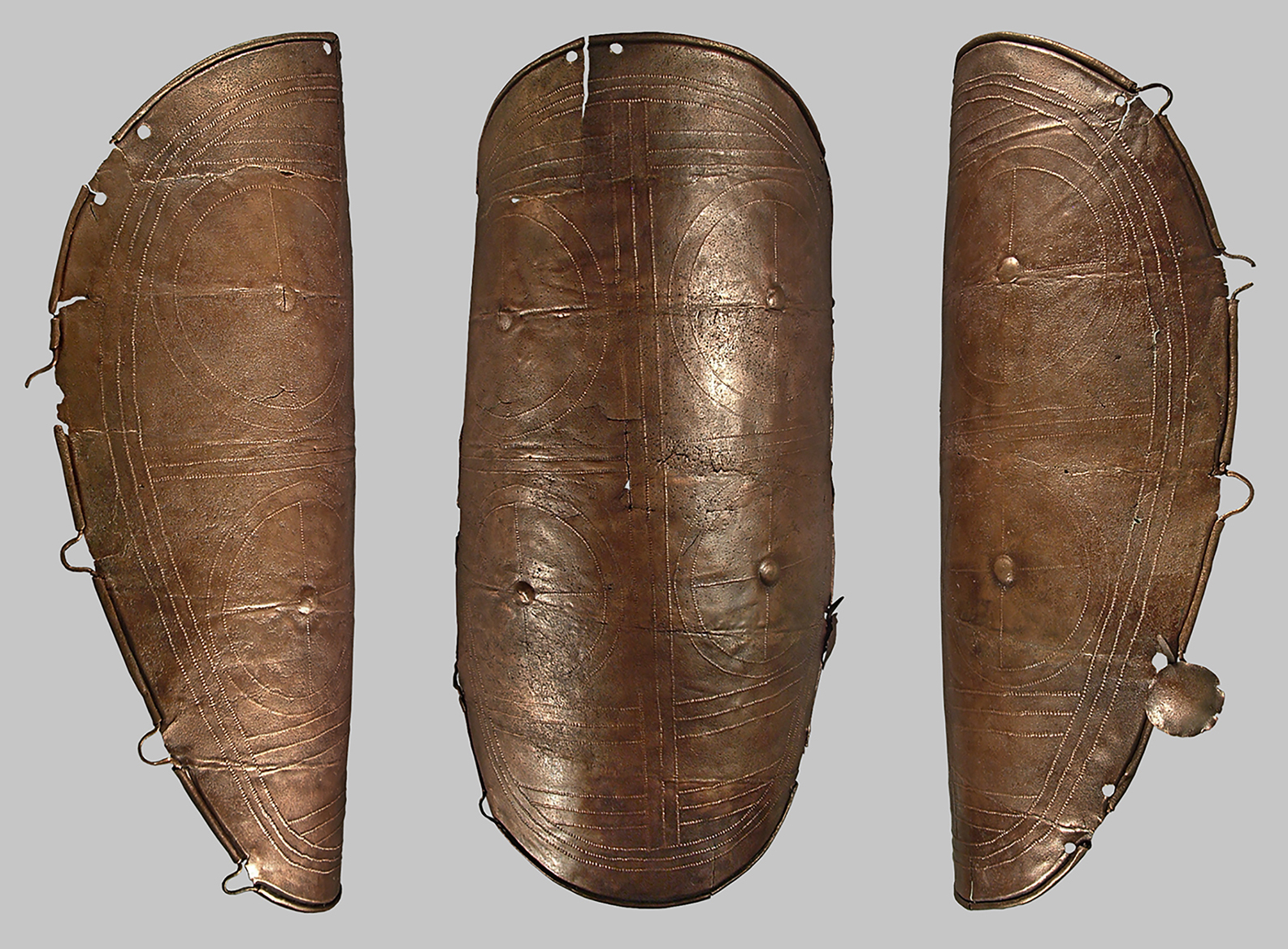
Bronze greave with sun cross symbols, Hungary

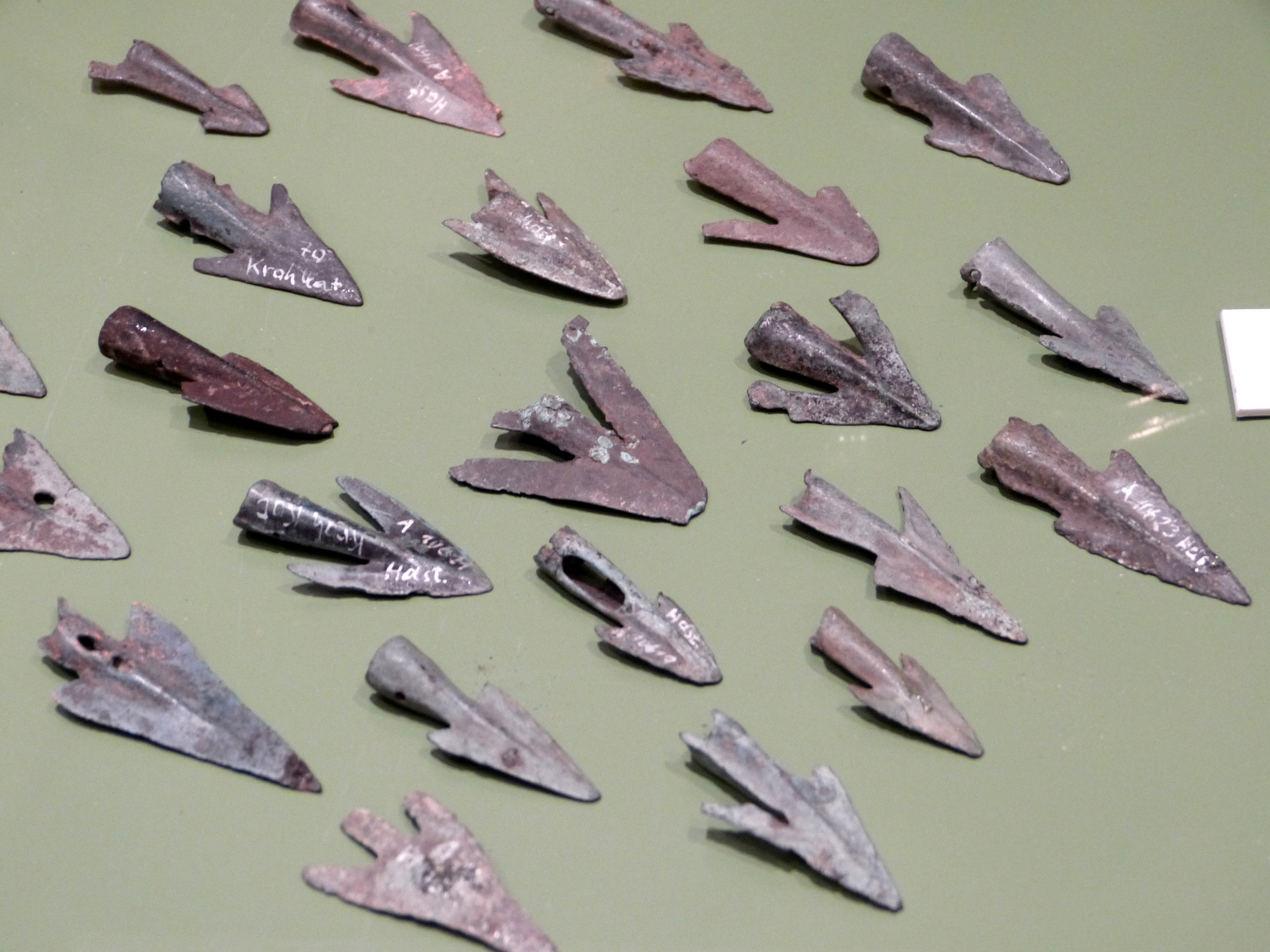
Bronze arrowheads, Austria

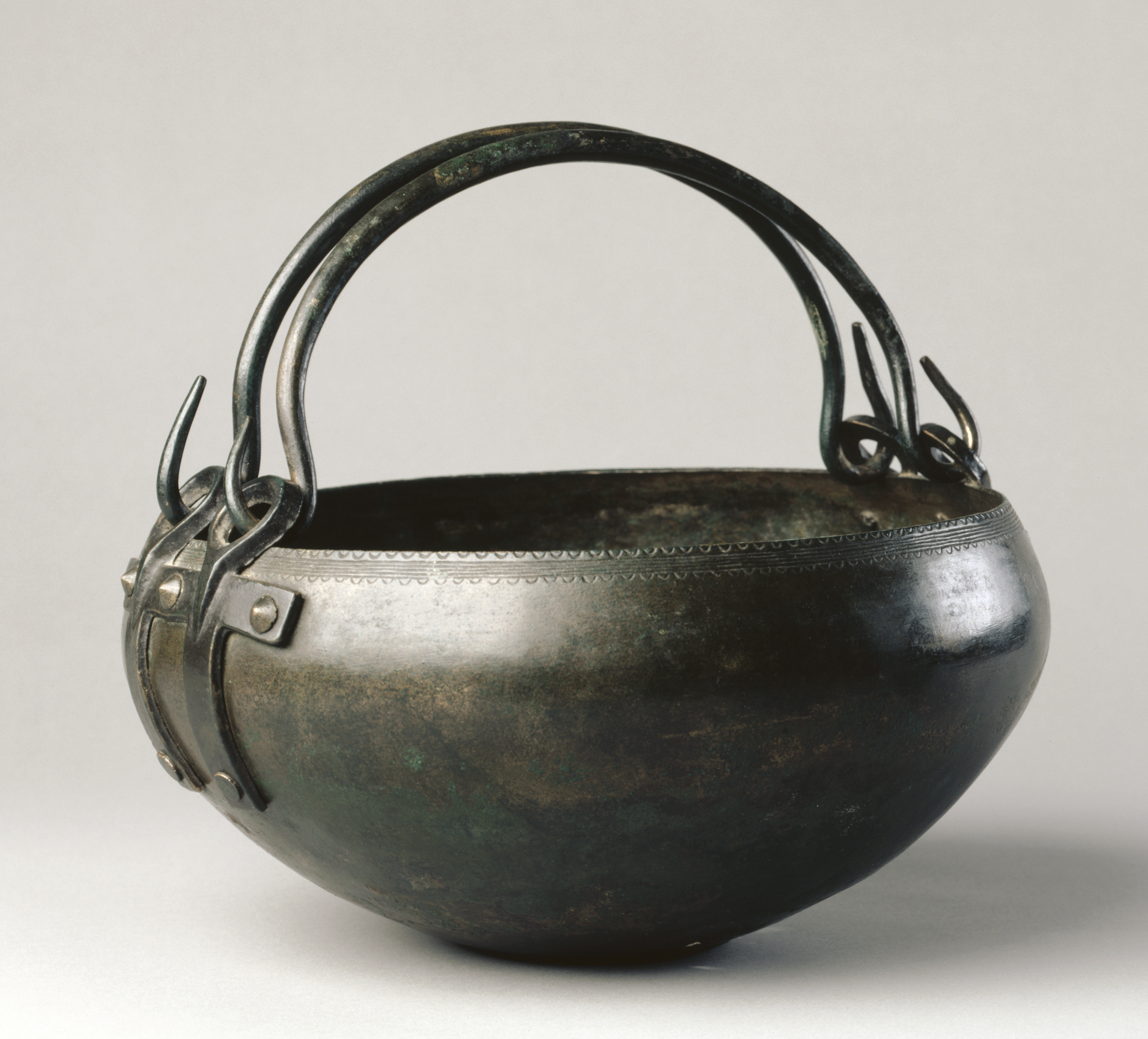
Bronze cauldron from Hungary, c. 1000 BC

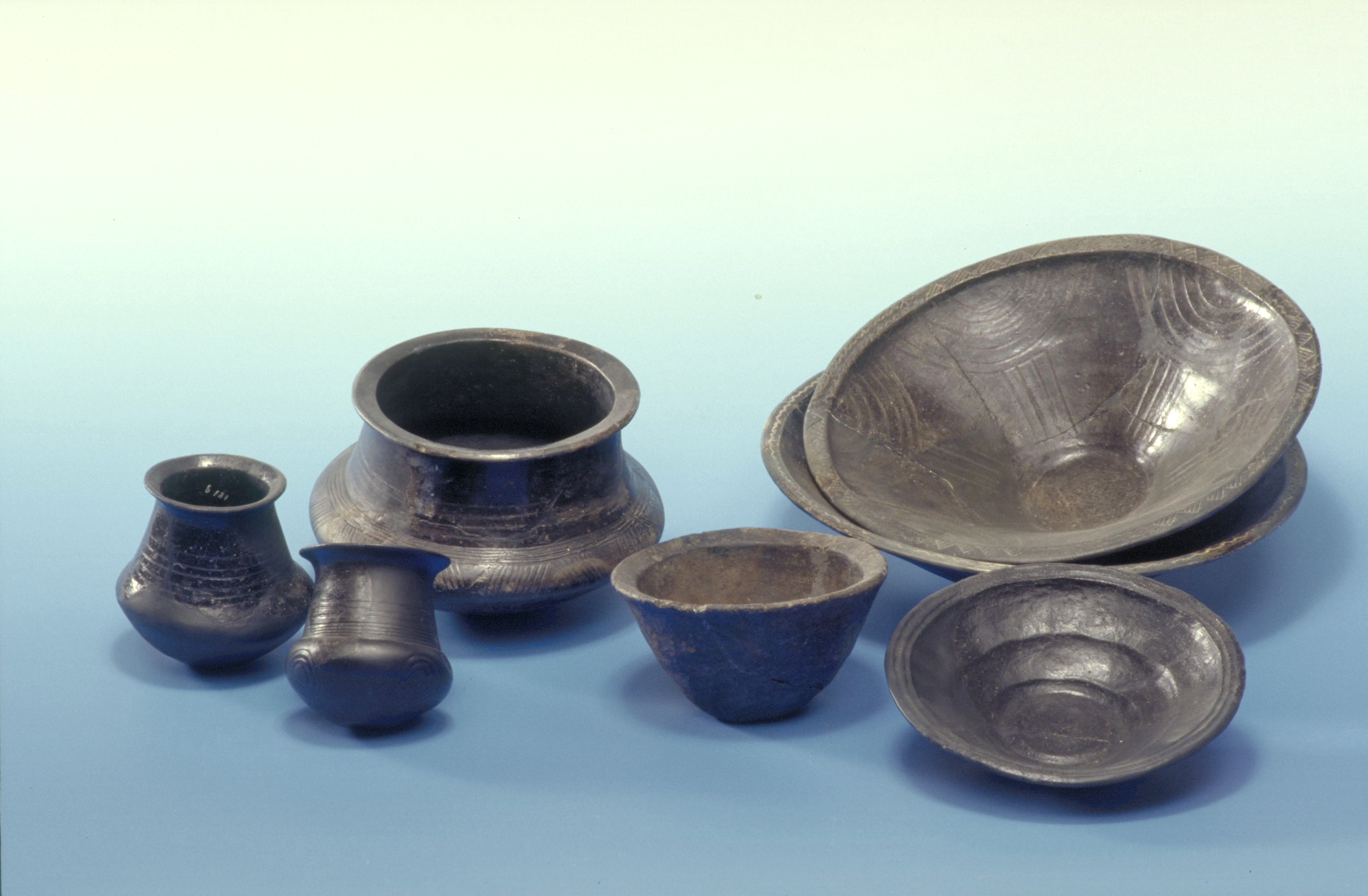
Pottery, Switzerland

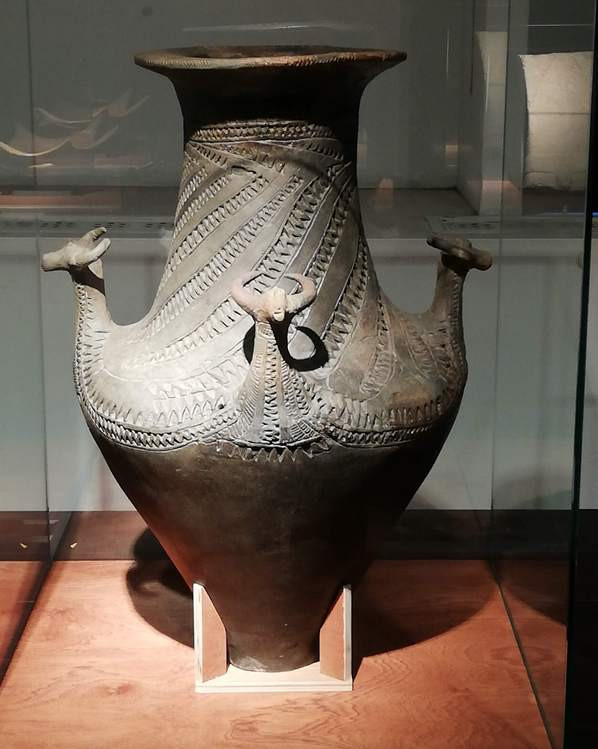
Pottery, Romania, 13th century BC

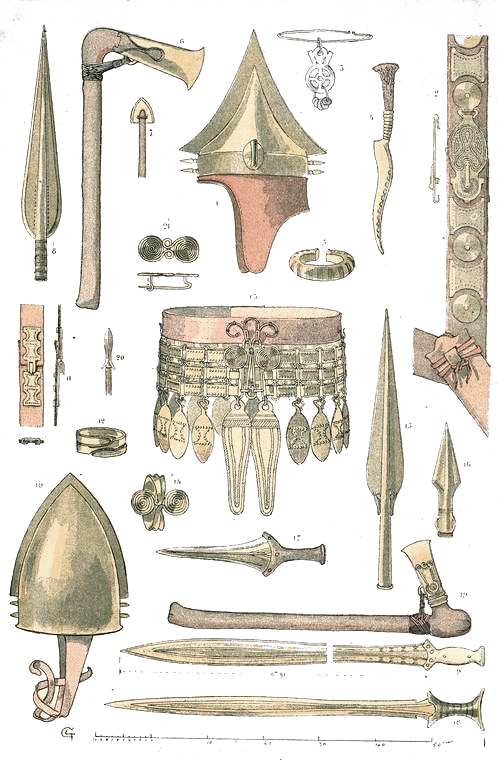
Various artefacts, France

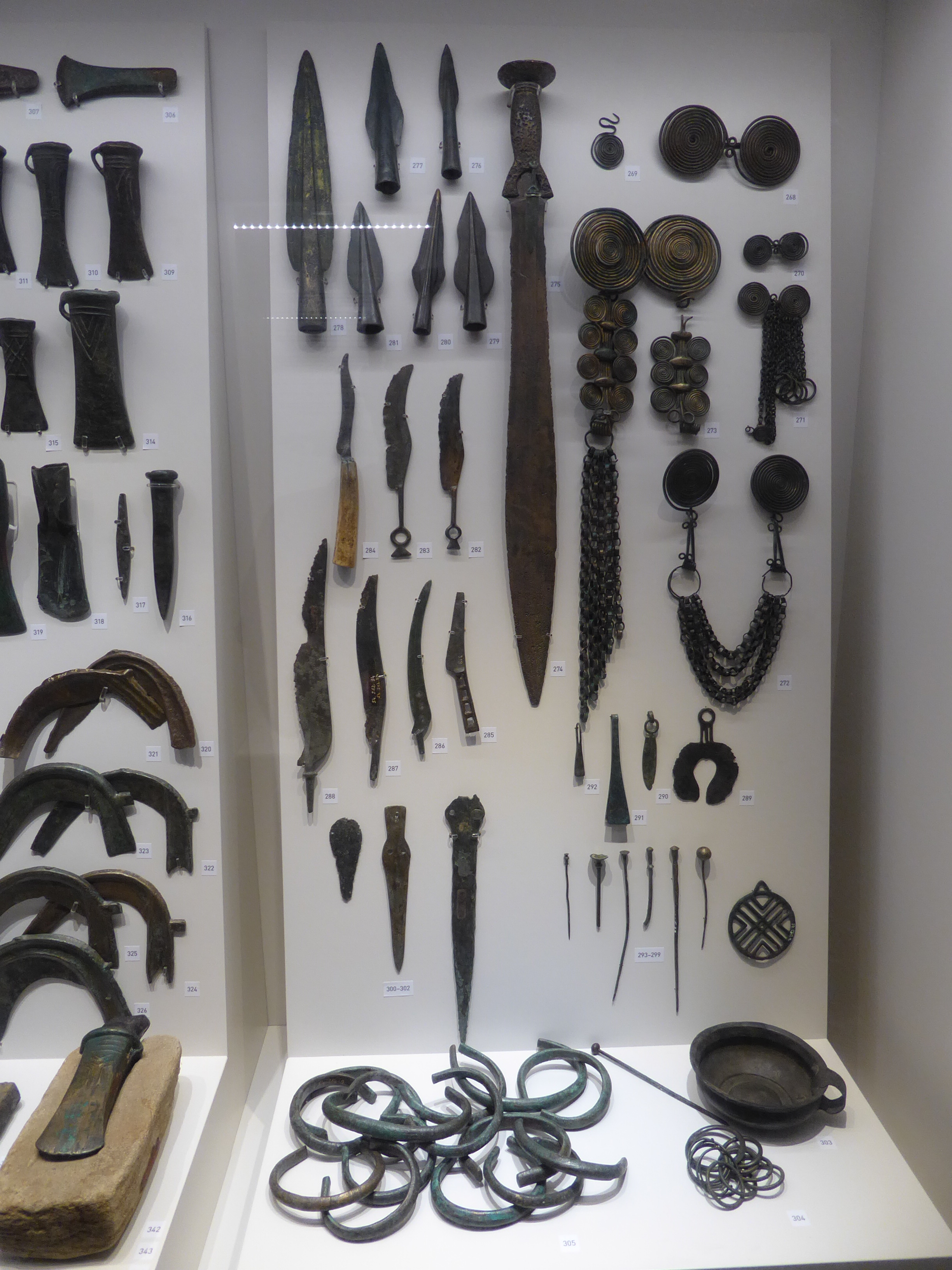
Various artefacts, Hungary

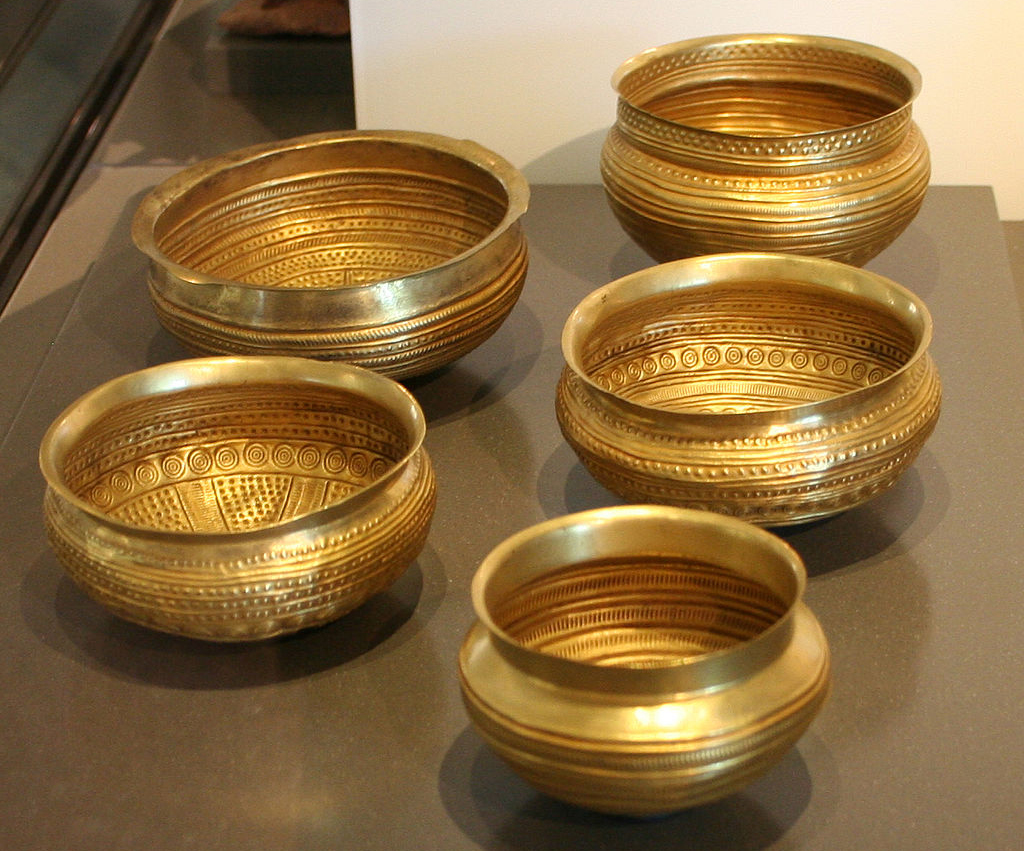
Gold bowls from Eberswalde, Germany, 9th century BC

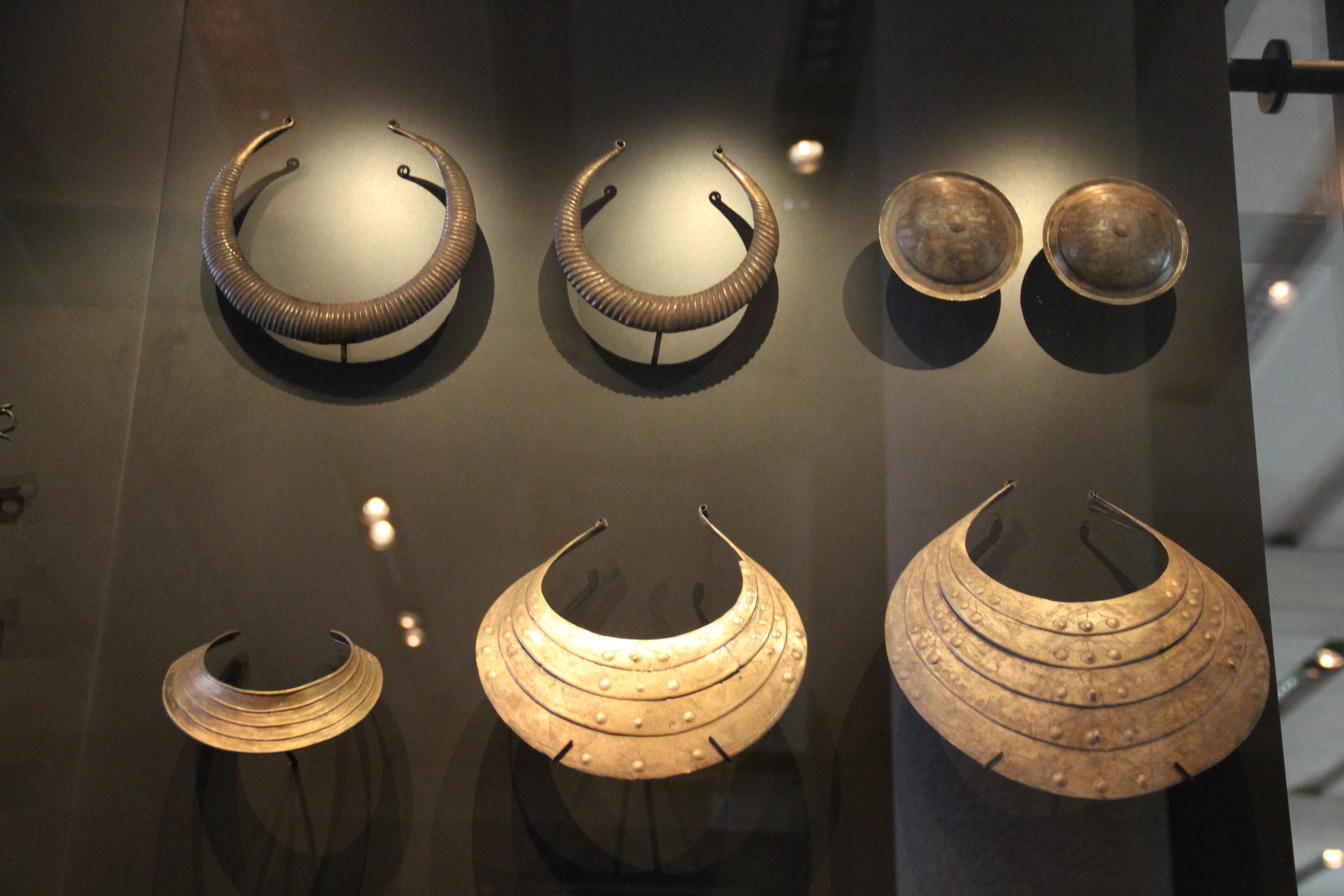
Bronze pectorals, torcs and discs, Poland.

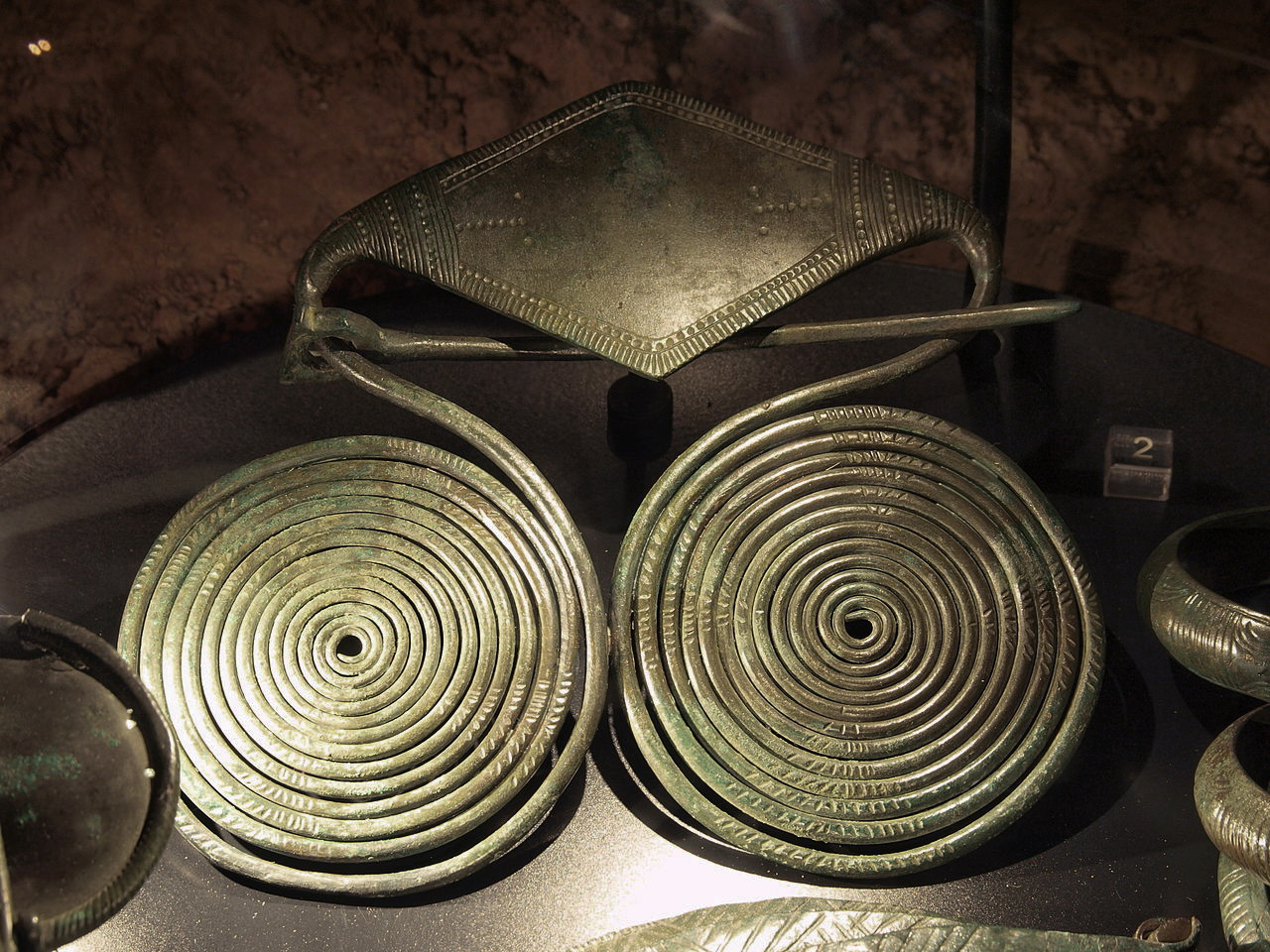
Large brooch, Germany

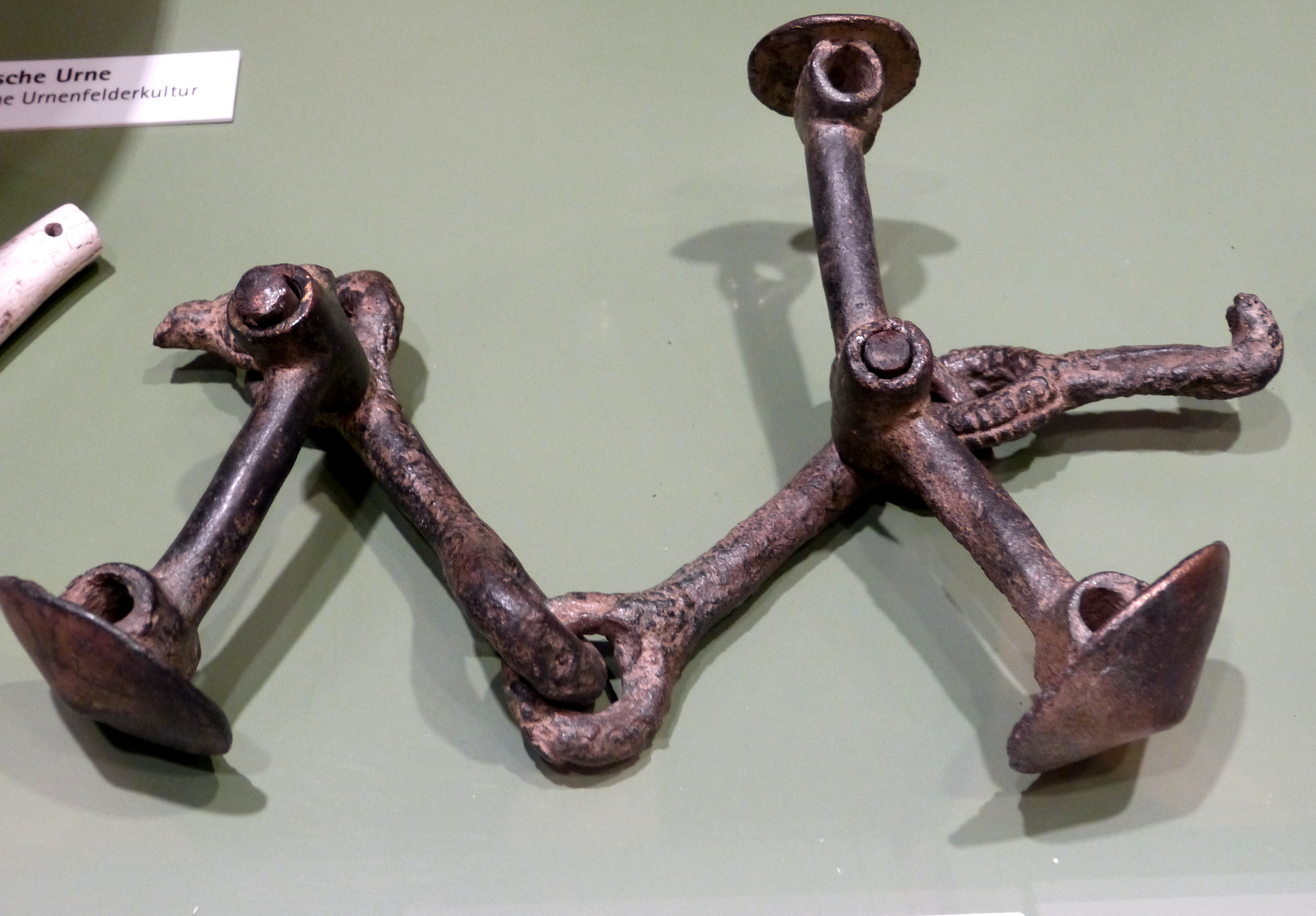
Horse bit, Austria, c. 1000 BC

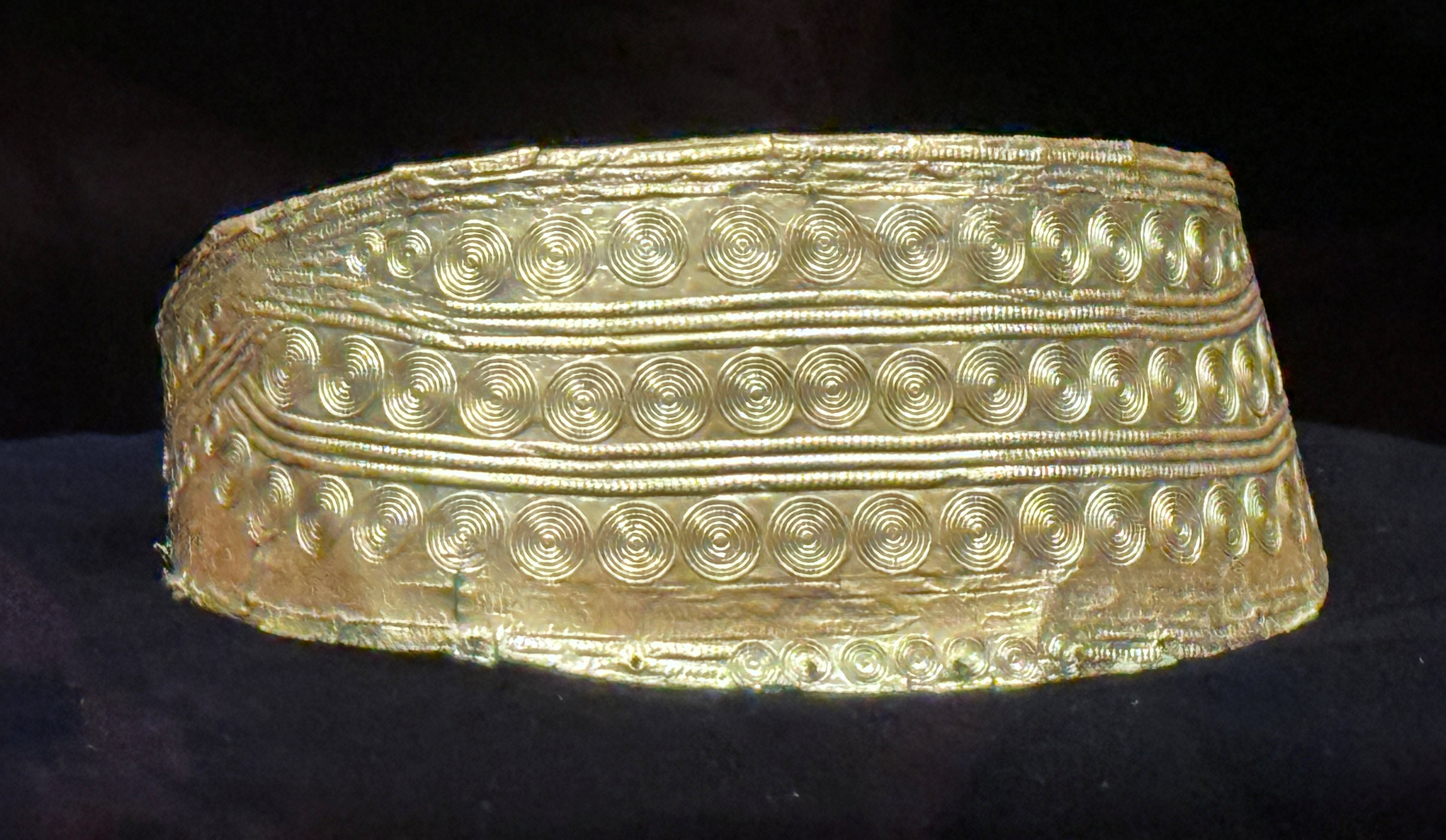
Gold collar, Hungary, c. 1050-800 BC

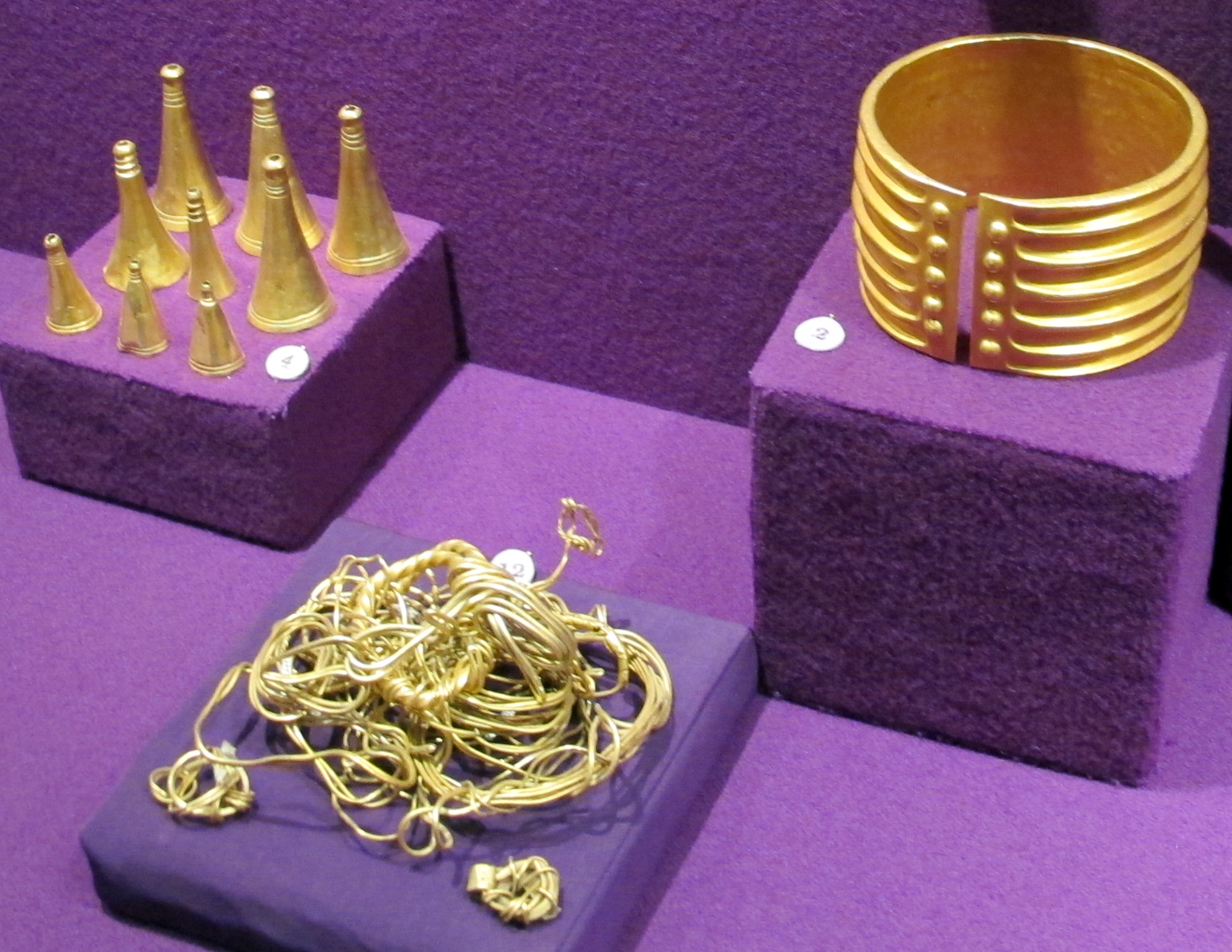
Hinova Treasure, Romania, 12th cent. BC

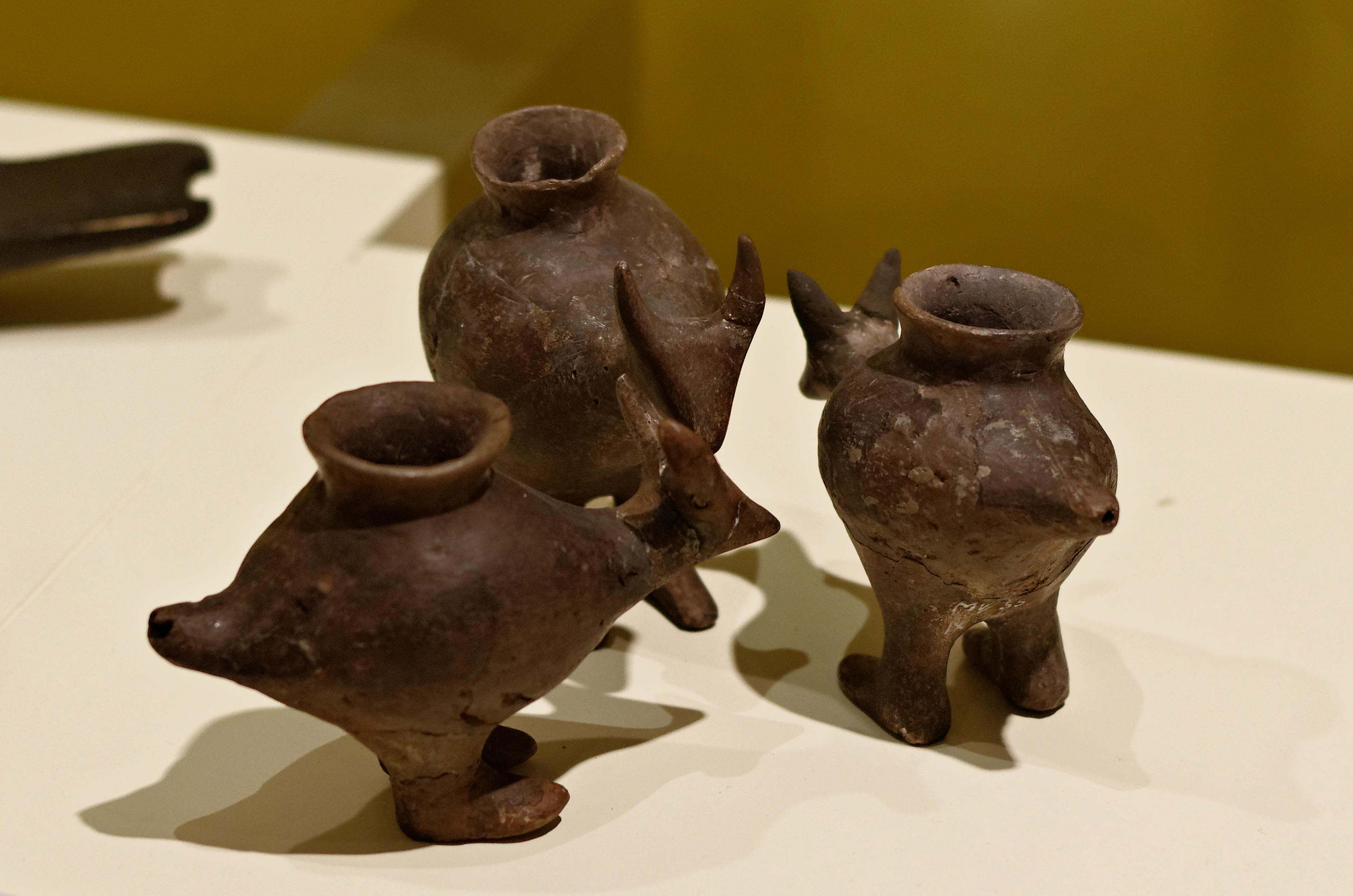
Baby bottles, Austria, c. 1200 BC.

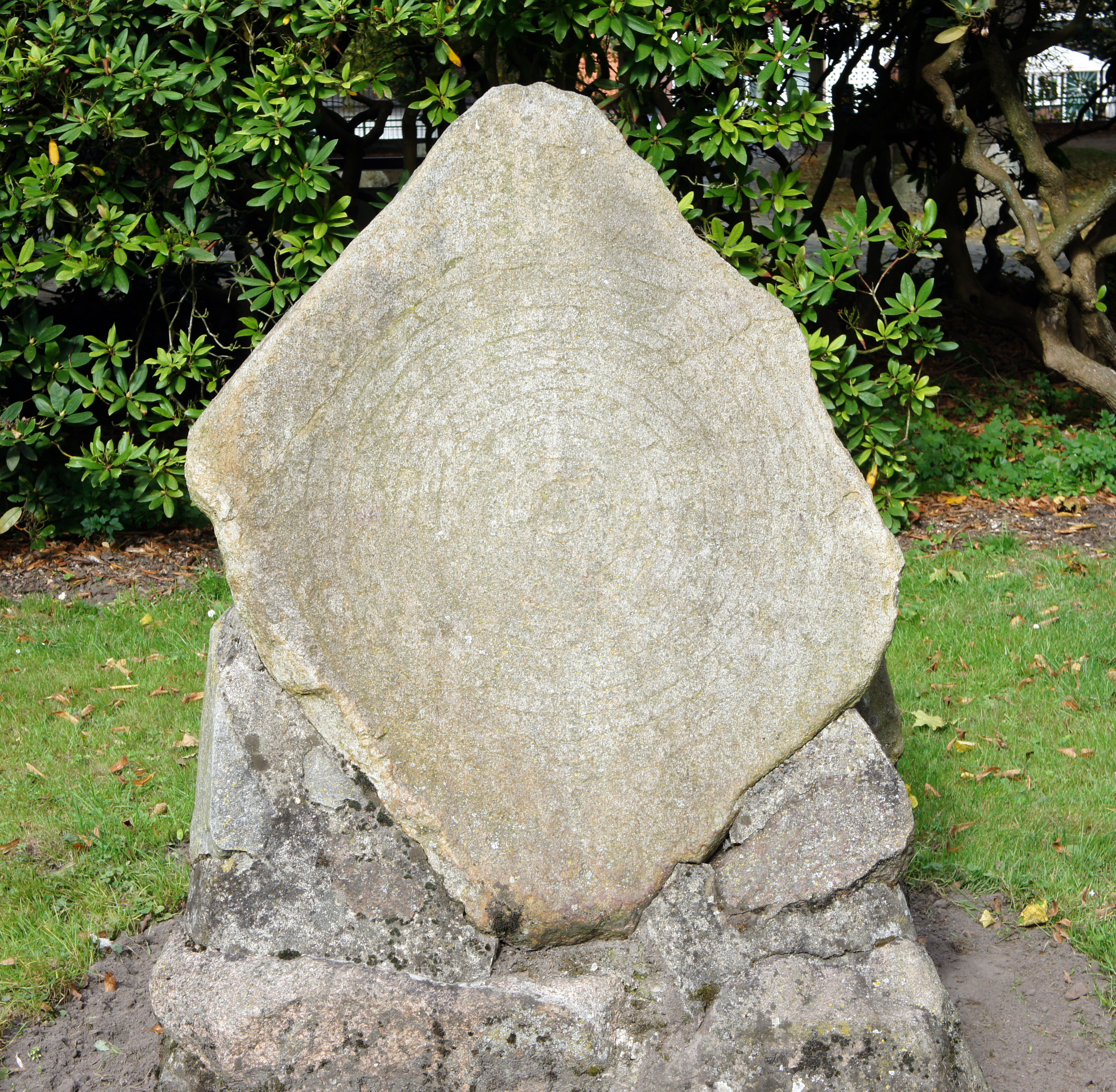
Harpstedt Sun Stone, Germany

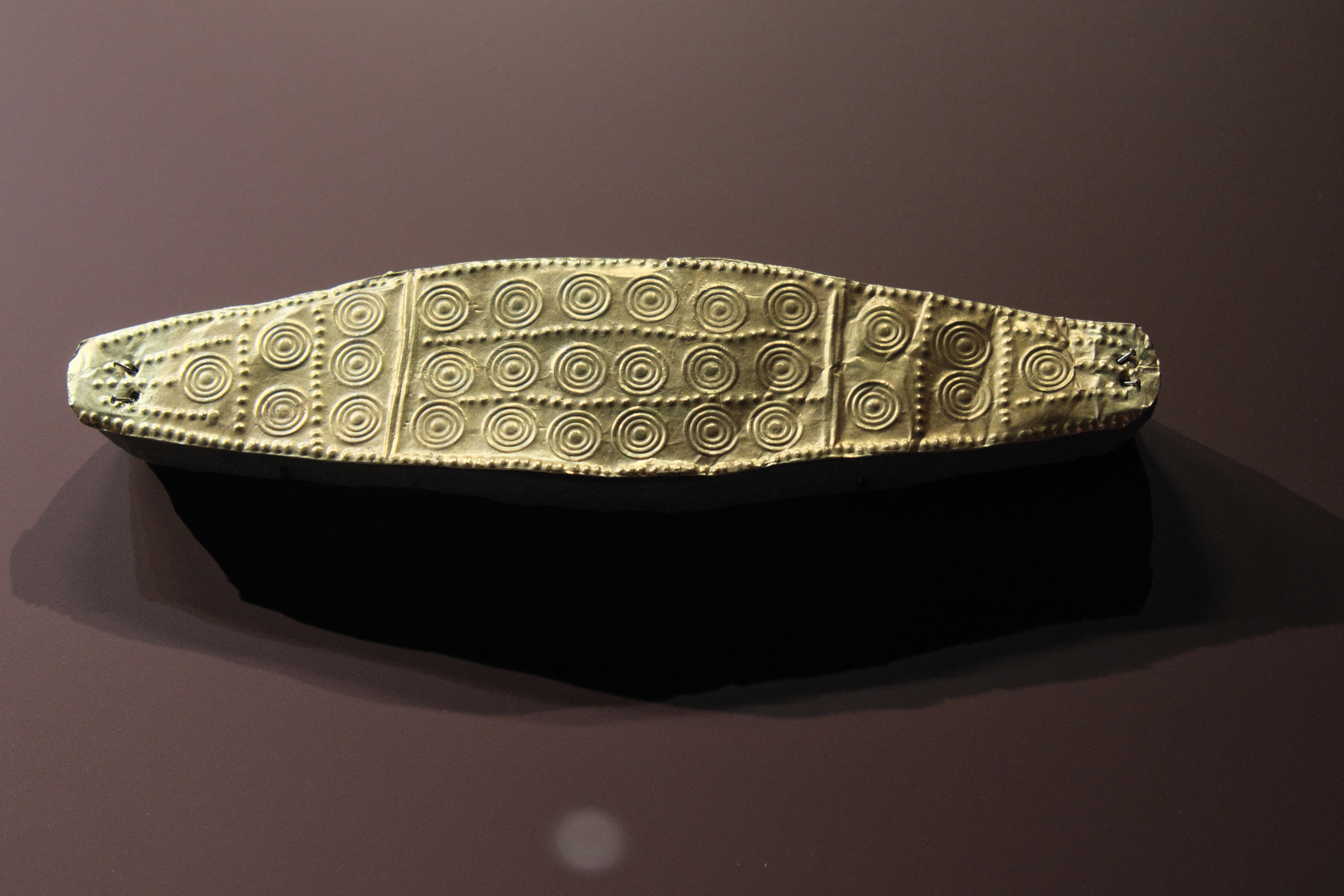
Gold appliqué from the Bullenheimer Berg, Germany

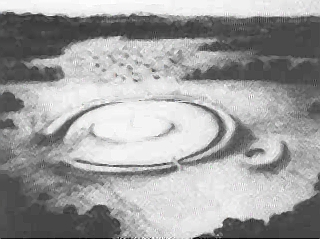
Goloring circular earthwork, Germany

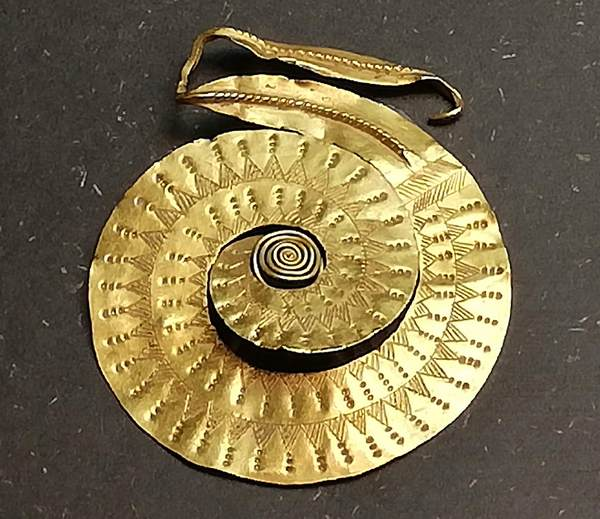
Gold from the Sarasau hoard, Romania, c. 1300-1200 BC

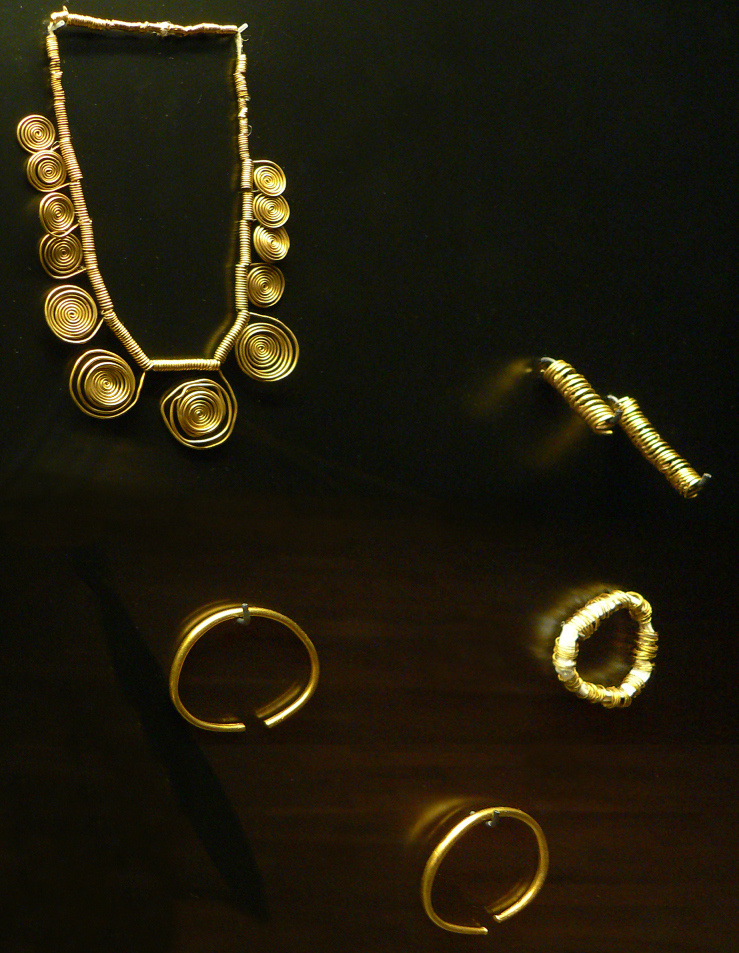
Gold jewellery from Lorup, Germany

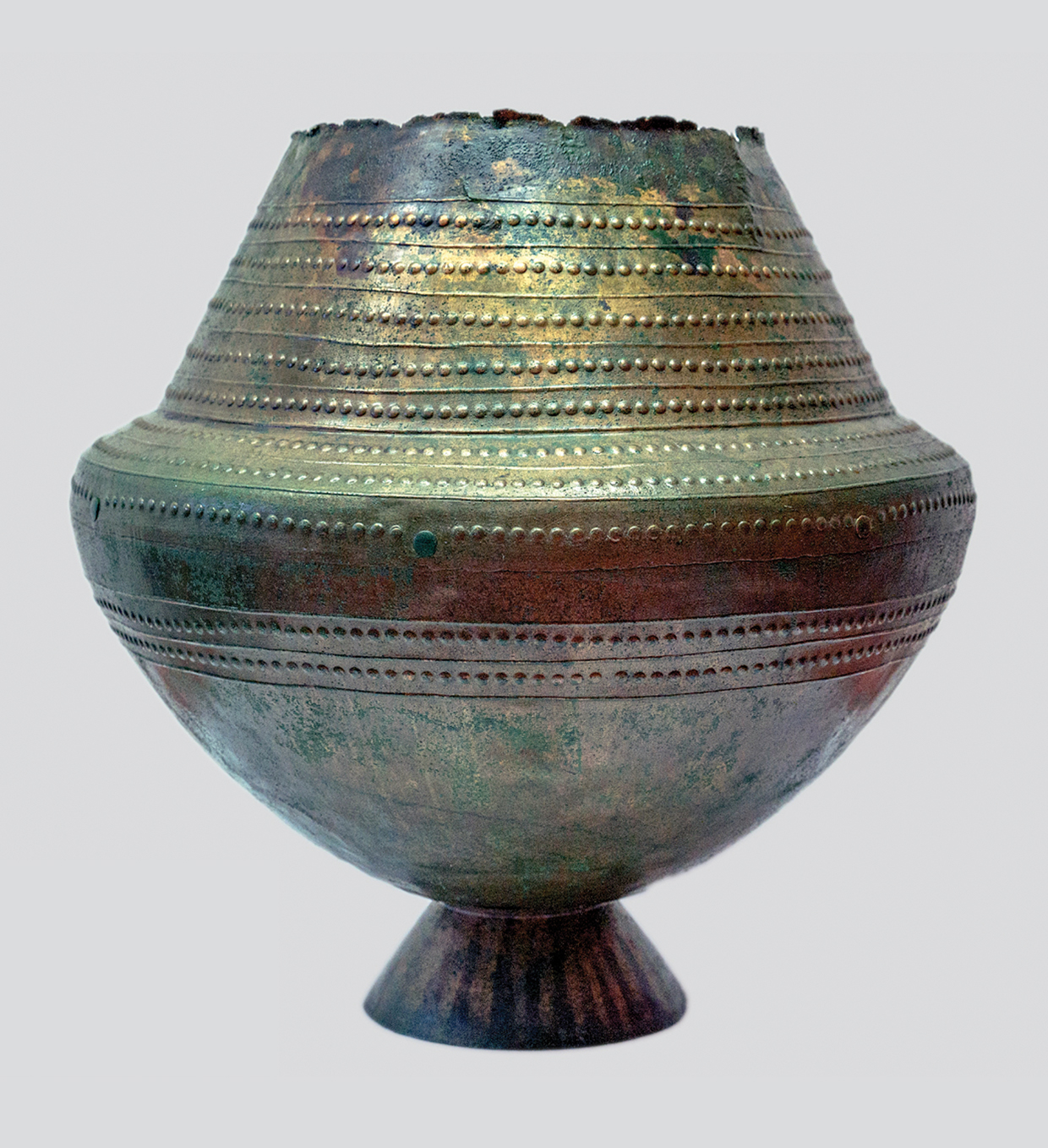
Bronze urn, Poland, c. 950 BC

== See also ==
- Prehistoric Europe
- Bronze Age Europe
- Beaker culture
- Nordic Bronze Age
- Tumulus culture
- Hallstatt culture
- Lusatian culture
- Solar deity
- Sorothaptic language

== Bibliography ==
- Antonio, Margaret L.; et al. (8 November 2019). "Ancient Rome: A genetic crossroads of Europe and the Mediterranean". Science. 366 (6466). American Association for the Advancement of Science: 708–714. Bibcode:2019Sci...366..708A. doi:10.1126/science.aay6826. PMC 7093155. PMID 31699931.
- J. M. Coles/A. F. Harding, The Bronze Age in Europe (London 1979).
- G. Weber, Händler, Kieger, Bronzegießer (Kassel 1992).
- Ute Seidel, Bronzezeit. Württembergisches Landesmuseum Stuttgart (Stuttgart 1995).
- Konrad Jażdżewski, Urgeschichte Mitteleuropas (Wrocław 1984)
- Association Abbaye de Daoulas (eds.), Avant les Celtes. L'Europe a l'age du Bronze (Daoulas 1988).
- Haak, Wolfgang; et al. (2 March 2015). "Massive migration from the steppe was a source for Indo-European languages in Europe". Nature. 522 (7555). Nature Research: 207–211. arXiv:1502.02783. Bibcode:2015Natur.522..207H. doi:10.1038/nature14317. PMC 5048219. PMID 25731166.
- Olalde, Iñigo; et al. (15 March 2019). "The genomic history of the Iberian Peninsula over the past 8000 years". Science. 363 (6432). American Association for the Advancement of Science: 1230–1234. Bibcode:2019Sci...363.1230O. doi:10.1126/science.aav4040. PMC 6436108. PMID 30872528.
- Frans Theuws, Nico Roymans (eds.), Land and ancestors: cultural dynamics in the Urnfield period and the Middle Ages in the southern Netherlands, Amsterdam Archaeological Studies, Amsterdam University Press, 1999, ISBN 978-90-5356-278-9.
