= Chierici =

Chierici is a surname. Notable people with the surname include:

- Alfonso Chierici (1816–1873), Italian painter
- Gaetano Chierici (1838–1920), Italian painter
- Giovanni Chierici (1830–1917), Italian sculptor
- Lorenzo Chierici (1895–1943), Italian government official
- Vittoria Chierici (born 1955), Italian artist

== See also ==
- Chierico, surname
- Palazzo del Seminario dei Chierici, palace in Sicily
