= Angiolini =

Angiolini is an Italian surname. Notable people with the surname include:

- Ambra Angiolini (born 1977), Italian TV host and singer in the 1990s
- Elish Angiolini (born 1960), Scottish lawyer
- Fortunata Angiolini (1776–1817), Italian dancer, one of the first who danced on pointes
- Francesco Angiolini (1750–1788), Jesuit scholar
- Gasparo Angiolini (1731–1803), Italian dancer and choreographer and composer
- Napoleone Angiolini (1797–1871), Italian painter
- Renato Angiolini (1923–1985), Italian songwriter and pianist
- Sandro Angiolini (1920–1985), Italian comics creator
