= Daniel Giulianini =

Italian operatic bass

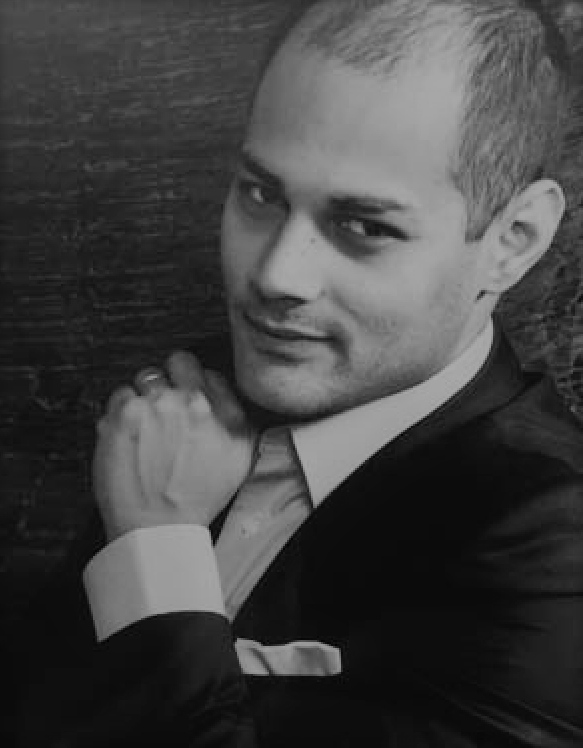
- Born: 12 December 1987 (age 37); Burgas, People's Republic of Bulgaria
- Occupation: Operatic bass
- Years active: 2009–present

Daniel Giulianini (born 12 December 1987 in Burgas, Bulgaria) is an Italian bass.

== Career ==
Daniel Giulianini made his stage debut in 2009 as Morales in Carmen in Lugo and as Haly in L’Italiana in Algeri at the Teatro Municipale (Reggio Emilia).

In 2016, he became one of the youngest Italians to ever debut at La Scala, Milan - he took the stage as Jim Larkens in La fanciulla del West.

He starred as Marchese d’Obigny in La Traviata at the 97th Arena di Verona Opera Festival in 2019.

In October 2021 Daniel Giulianini performed as Masetto in Don Giovanni at the Toulon Opera, France. In February 2022 he made a debut as Bartolo in The Barber of Seville at Malmö Opera, Sweden. In May 2022 Daniel Giulianini made a role debut as Bartolo in The Marriage of Figaro at Teatro Real, Madrid.

== Awards and honors ==
Daniel Giulianini won a 2nd place at the Premio Etta Limiti Opera (2014).

== Personal life ==
Daniel Giulianini was reunited with his birth mother nearly 29 years after he had been given up for adoption at a Bulgarian orphanage. He is married and has two children.
