= Teatro Municipale (Reggio Emilia) =

Coordinates: 44°42′04″N 10°37′53″E

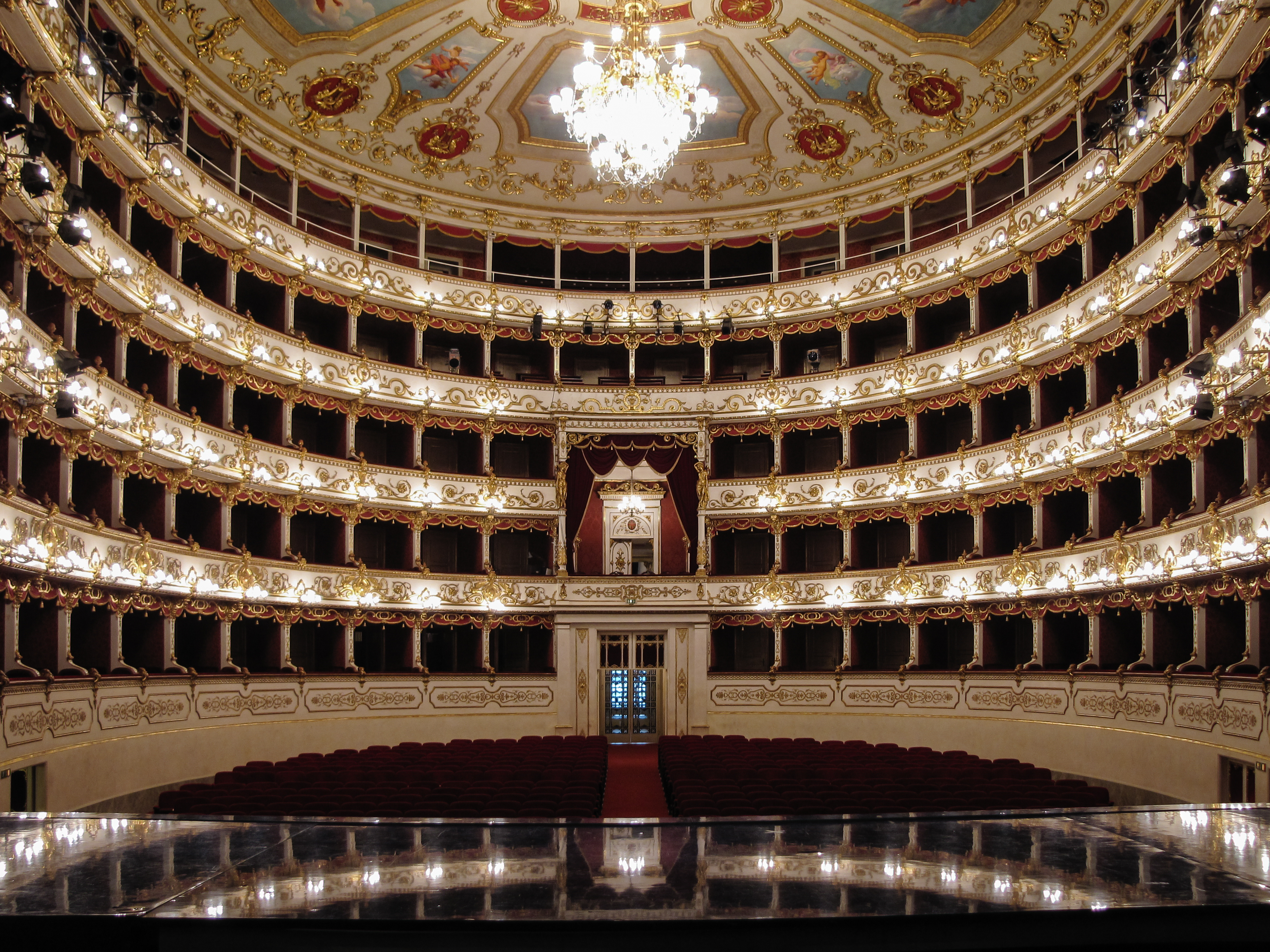
Auditorium of the Municipal Theatre of Reggio Emilia

The Teatro Municipale (also since the 1980s called the Teatro Municipale Valli due to being named after the actor Romolo Valli) is a theatre in Reggio Emilia, Northern Italy. Following the destruction by fire of the 1741 Teatro Cittadella in April 1851, the new theatre was designed by the architect Cesare Costa and constructed in the neoclassical style between 1852 and 1857. Its inauguration took place on 21 April 1857 with the performance of the Vittor Pisani by local composer Achille Peri.

It is the pre-eminent public theatre of the city and is located in its historical centre next to the public park and near the smaller and more recent theatre Teatro Ariosto. It sponsors concerts, operas and ballet performance, while the adjacent, smaller, and more recently built Teatro Ariosto serves a more intimate stage for dramatic performances. The theatre has a rectangular base that measures 80 x 43.60 meters and covers an area of 3,763 square meters. The audience capacity is 1150 people. It has 56 dressing rooms for the artists and 16 anterooms. The concert hall is elliptical and has 106 boxes placed on four tiers plus a regal box and a gallery. The frescoes on the ceiling are of the local artist Domenico Pellizzi. The curtain was painted by Alfonso Chierici.

The outside is composed by 12 Tuscan columns made of granite on the ground floor while on the first floor it has 13 windows spaced by Ionic columns. On top of the building there are statues made by sculptors Prudenzio Piccioli, Ilario Bedotti, Giovanni Chierici, Antonio Ilarioli, Attilio Rabaglia.
