= Gaetano Bellei =

Italian painter (1857–1922)

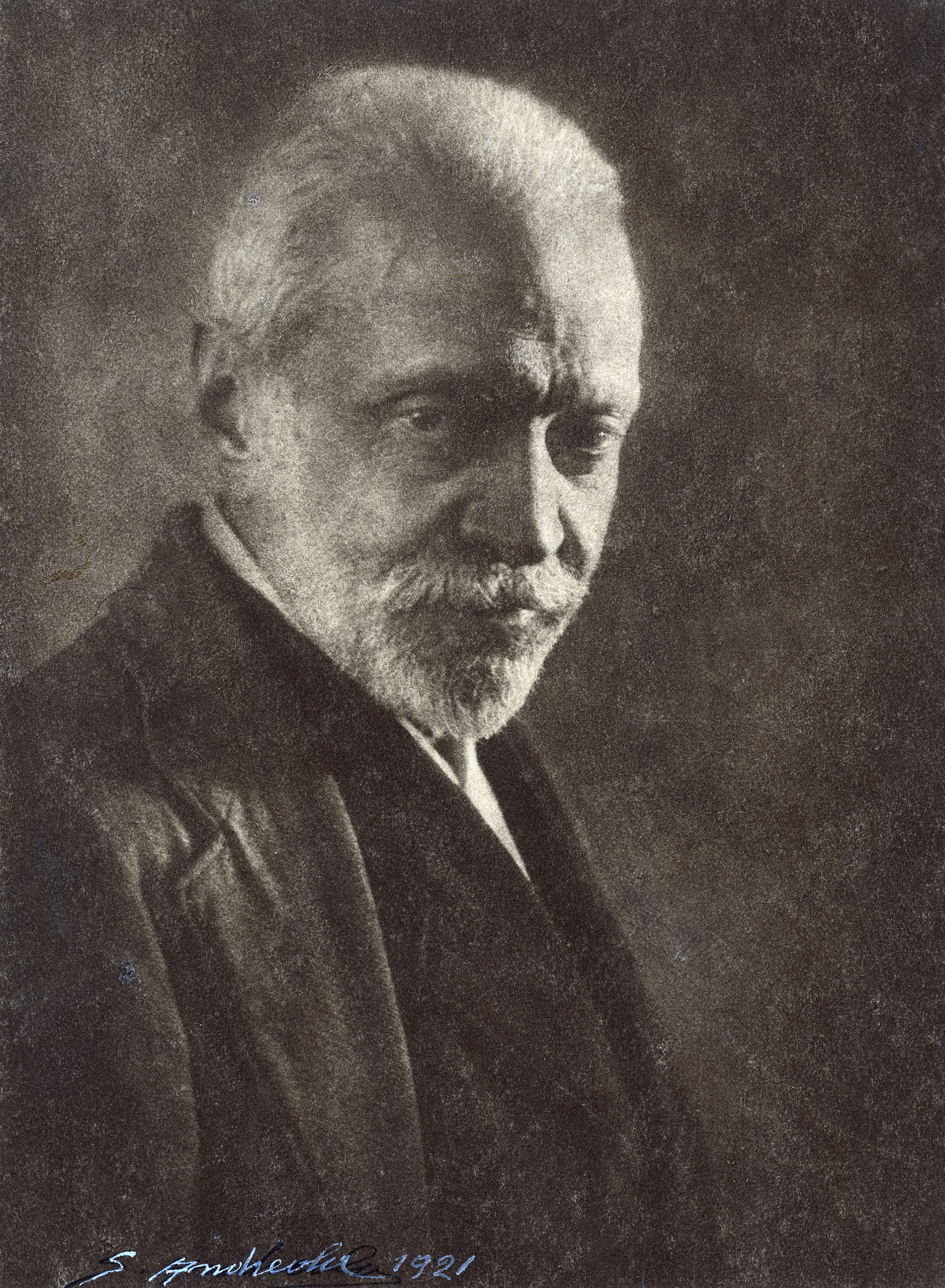
- Born: 22 January 1857; Modena, Duchy of Modena and Reggio
- Died: 20 March 1922 (aged 65); Modena, Kingdom of Italy

Gaetano Bellei (22 January 1857 – 20 March 1922) was an Italian painter, best known for his genre scenes, portraits, and works on religious subjects.

== Biography ==
Gaetano Bellei was born in the family of Lorenzo and Vienna Molinari. After completing his art education at the Academy of Fine Arts in Modena, under the direction of Adeodato Malatesta, he moved to Rome, where he studied at the Accademia di San Luca, and then at the French and Spanish academies.

In 1883, Bellei went to Florence for a year, where, using the scholarship he had received for artists, he completed his studies. There, thanks to his ability to work in different genres, he became friends with collectors, merchants and patrons of English descent, who commissioned him for various types of work. During this period, Bellei met Gaetano Chierici. He died in Modena in 1922.

=== Early years ===
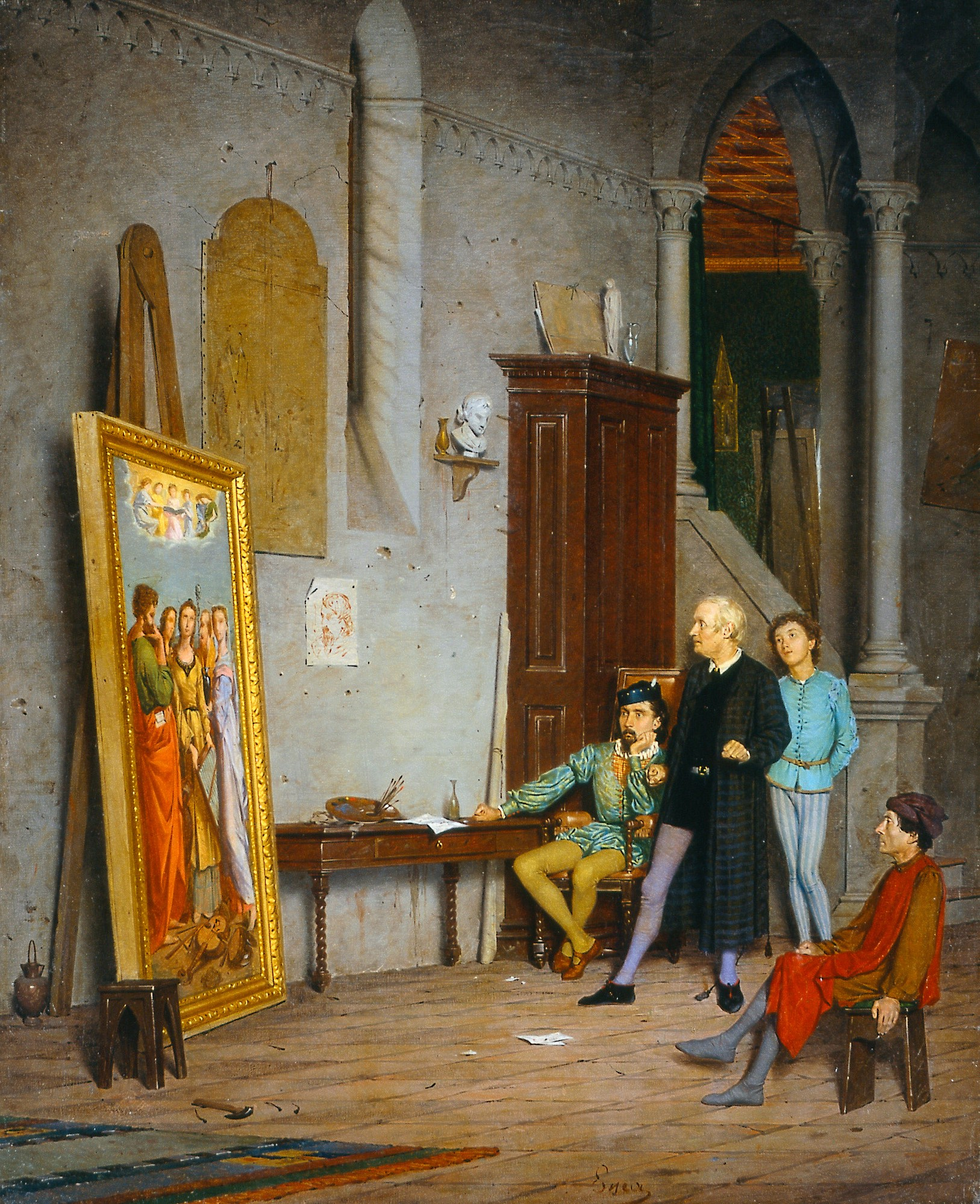
Francesco Francia admiring Raphael's Saint Cecilia for the first time, 1876

At an early stage of his work, Bellei painted genre scenes, the details and features of which he subsequently often reproduced, with various variations, in new works, since they are appreciated by collectors and patrons of the arts. The narrative nature and frivolous themes of his paintings are combined with excellent technique and often in line with mainstream European trends. Bellei was also involved in portraiture and sacred painting. Beginning in 1893 he taught at the Modena Academy, but continued to participate in exhibitions such as Turin in 1898, Milan in 1906 and Rome in 1911. In 1876, while still a student, he won the competition for the Poletti Prize with the painting Francesco Francia Admiring Raphael's Saint Cecilia for the First Time, defeating Achille Boschi. Thanks to this eminently scenographic picture, Bellay became a Fellow. Subsequently, his paintings departed from academism, causing controversy with their realistic character. Thus, Resfa – a work in rough and dark colors, inspired by German Symbolism – at first attracted criticism, but then was widely recognized as "the best painting of modern art in Modena".

Domenico Morelli has argued that Bellei "seems to hold both the imaginary and the real".

== Art and themes ==
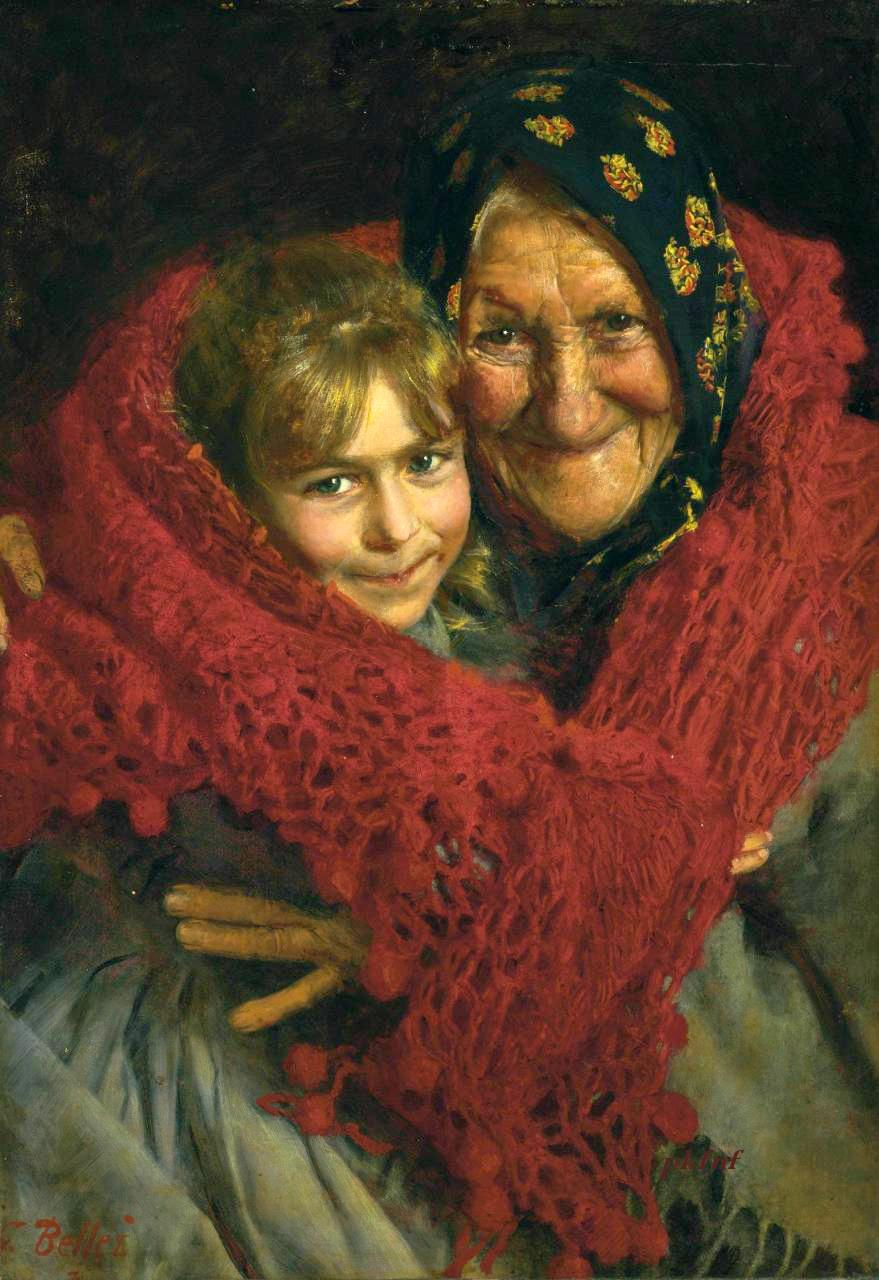
Grandmother and Granddaughter

=== Genre painting ===
Gaetano Bellei's favorite themes are old people and children. He painted scenes of humble, everyday rural life, in which there are, for example, grandfather and grandson hugging each other, as well as card players, monks, workers, and sometimes animals. Many of them exist in different variations, since they are appreciated by the buying public. Bellei manifests himself as a master of depicting human affections, reactions and sensations. At an exhibition in Genoa in 1885, he first presented Happy Kitten (Il micino fortunato), which brought him such a commercial success that Bellei immediately reproduced several versions of the same subject.

Bellei also dabbled in Art Nouveau, for example, in the painting In the Rain, where the technique of conveying rain and clothes of models attracts attention, and in the manner of pointillism, for example, in the canvas Port of Livorno.

=== Portrait and sacred painting ===
Bellei created a number of religious works, including an altarpiece with the Redeemer for the parish in Zocca and Blessed Cottolengo for the Rangoni chapel in Bomporto. In 1914 he decorated and painted the main chapel of the Church of Santa Maria di Munano, then painted Saint Magdalene for the Church of San Domenico in Modena. Later he devoted himself entirely to altar painting, working throughout all province of Modena.

Bellei's period of passion for portraiture marked a return to divisionism. The artist was hired to paint a number of official portraits, and also painted more personal works, such as portraits of the spouses Palazzi, Ferruccio Cambi, or Self-portrait.

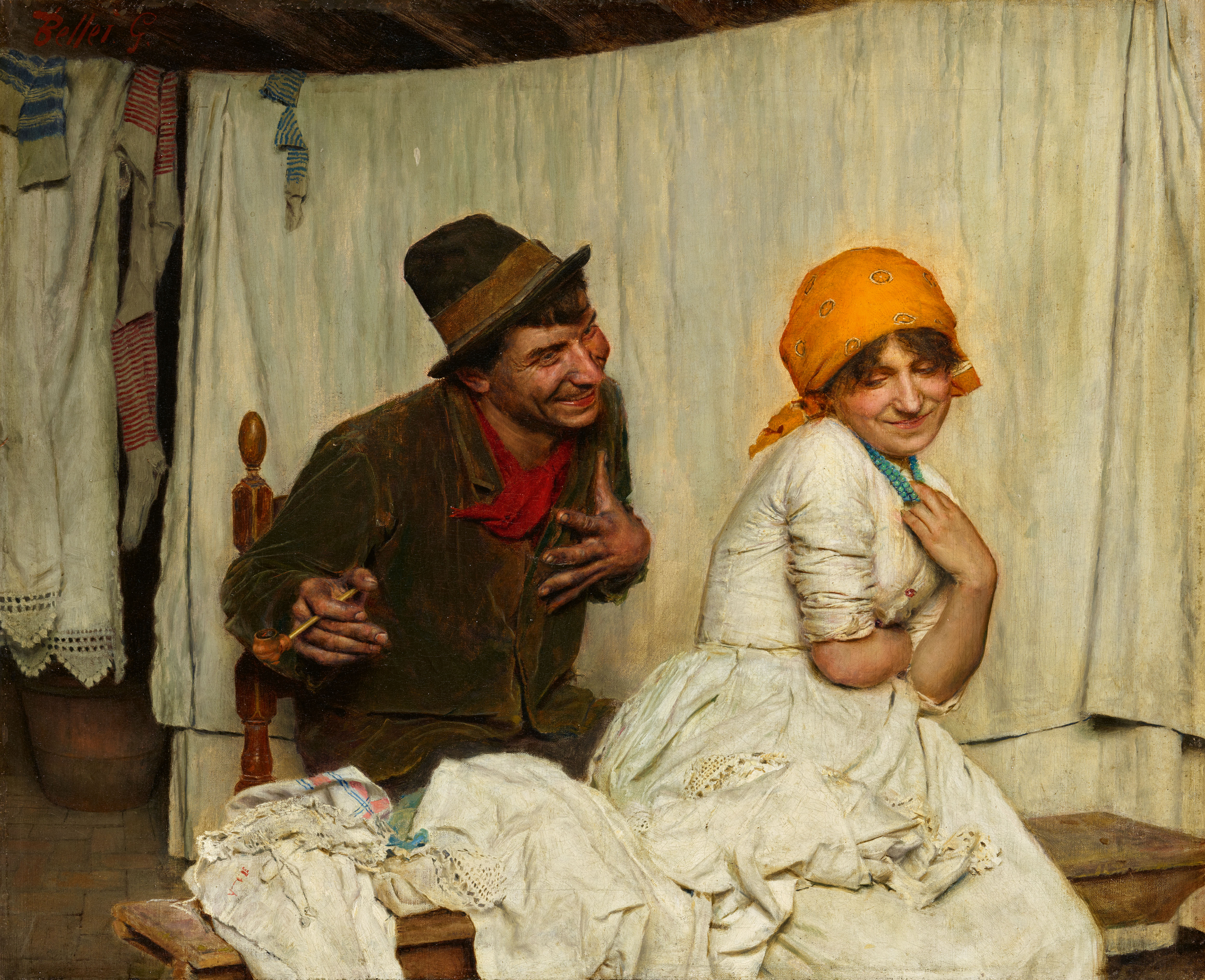
L'avance

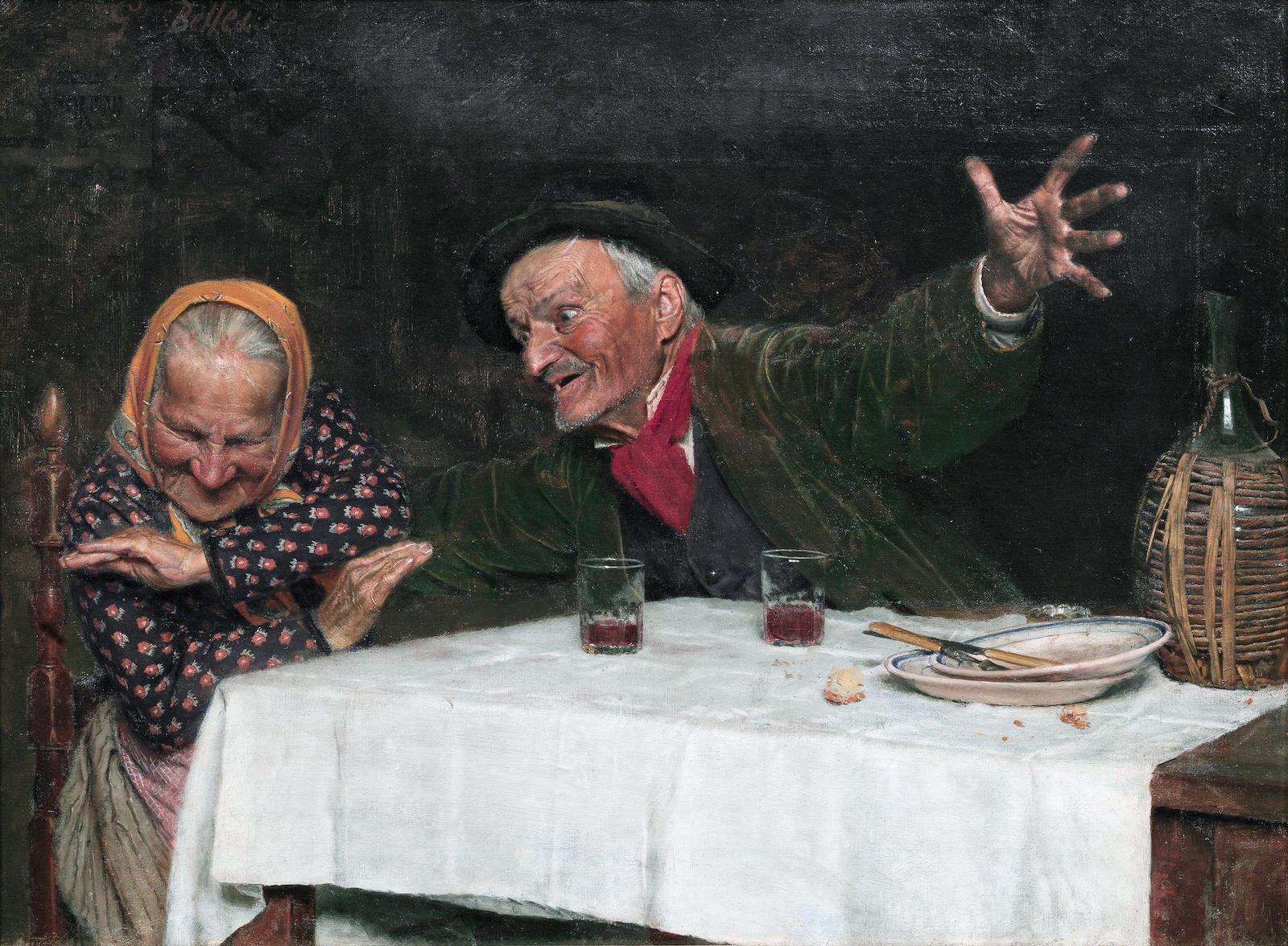
The Joker

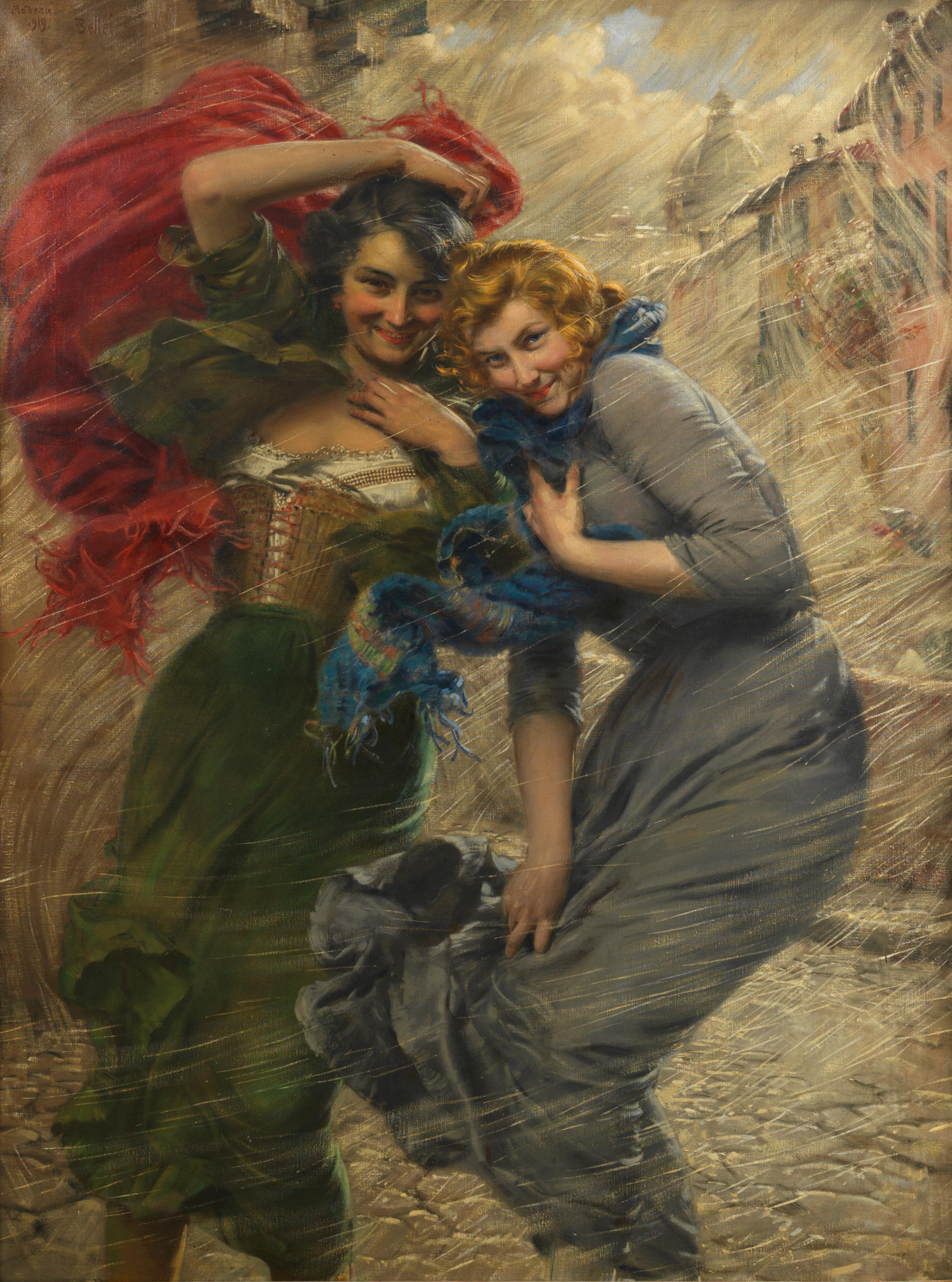
Rainy Day, 1919

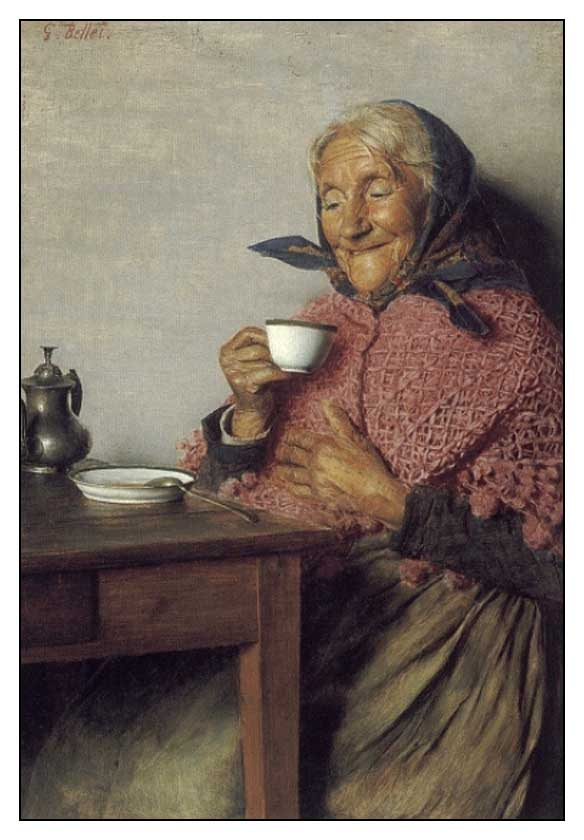
Una buona birra
