= Pellegrino Strobel =

Italian ornithologist, zoologist and naturalist

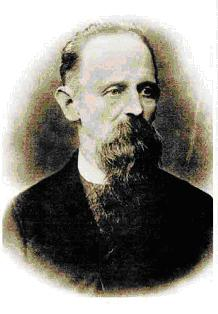
- Pellegrino Strobel
- Born: August 22, 1821
- Died: June 8, 1895 (aged 73)
- Scientific career
- Fields: zoology

Pellegrino Strobel (22 August 1821 – 8 June 1895) was an Italian ornithologist, zoologist, naturalist and Italian politician. He is considered among the leaders of Italian malacology and, with Gaetano Chierici and Luigi Pigorini, is an important figure in Italian prehistoric archaeology.

== Biography ==
Pellegrino Strobel was the fourth of the eight children of the Tyrolean nobleman Michael Ströbel, an official of the Habsburg government of the Kingdom of Lombardy–Venetia. He was born in Milan, in the Palazzo Marino. In 1857 he moved to Piacenza then in 1859 to Parma, where his father had obtained the position of councillor administration of Marie Louise, Duchess of Parma.

He was introduced to the study of natural history from a young age by his uncle Leonard Liebener, a well-known naturalist, and Alexander von Humboldt, a friend of the family. He attended the gymnasium in Merano and graduated in law at the University of Innsbruck in 1842. He studied natural sciences at the University of Pavia, but did not graduate, but was given the title doctor of natural sciences on March 10, 1872 while teaching in Parma. He was a member of numerous scientific institutions of international importance: in 1857 he was appointed professor of natural history in Piacenza in the "optional" schools, then on 6 December 1859 he was appointed professor of natural history at the University of Parma, where he was also a professor of mineralogy, geology and zoology.

He collaborated with Luigi Pigorini to study the lake-dwelling Terramara in a work which included paleontology, botany, zoology, entomology, palynology, geology, anthropology and archaeology, to build a complete picture of these Bronze Age communities.

In 1864 he was appointed to set up the Faculty of Natural Sciences at the University of Buenos Aires. He participated in numerous exploration trips in Patagonia and the Andes, about which he published numerous anthropological and ethnological studies and of which he would organize one of the most important collections of molluscs.

He returned to Europe on the death of his father and resumed teaching at the University of Parma, of which he was elected rector in 1891. He is especially remembered for notable studies on the culture of the Terramare and on the civilizations of the Bronze Age of Italy, as well as for his research on the molluscs of Italy.

He died of heart disease in 1895 in his villa in Vignale, a hamlet in the commune of Traversetolo, near Parma. One of his two sons was Daniele de Strobel, a well-known painter, mostly known for his fresco work in Parma and Piacenza.
