= Luigi Pigorini =

Italian politician

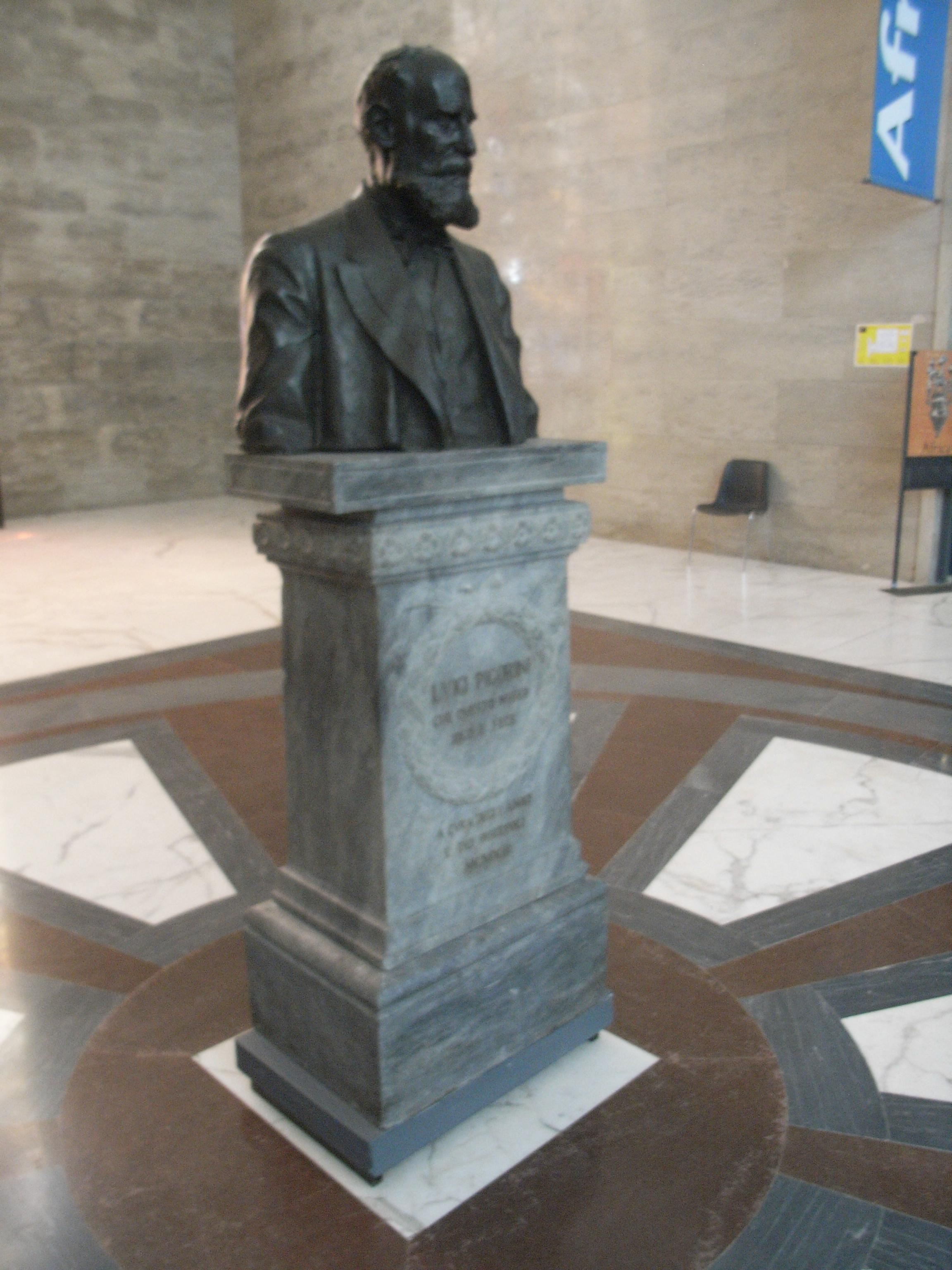
Bust of Luigi Pigorini in Pigorini National Museum of Prehistory and Ethnography in Rome

Luigi Pigorini (10 January 1842 – 1 April 1925) was an Italian palaeoethnologist, archaeologist and ethnographer.

== Biography ==
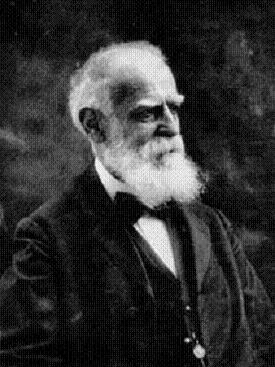
Luigi Pigorini

Pigorini was born at Fontanellato, near Parma.

At the age of sixteen years, in 1858, he became an alumnus of the Museo d'Antichità di Parma (Museum of Antiquities of Parma, now Parma Archaeological Museum). He later encountered Pellegrino Strobel, the professor of Natural Sciences at the University of Parma and Gaetano Chierici, director of the Gabinetto di Antichità Patrie di Reggio Emilia or Cabinet of Antiquities of the native land of Reggio Emilia (now Musei Civici di Reggio Emilia ) and began archaeological research in the territory of Parmesan. In 1863, he began to travel in Switzerland and Tuscany, and also studied in Rome and Naples.

He ran a course in Parma where he resorted to various materials in order to explain the uses and the functions of prehistoric tools. A few years later after becoming a Bachelor of Arts in Political and Administrative Sciences he became director of the Museum of Antiquity of Parma.

In 1875, he founded with Chierici and Strobel a paleoethnological journal Bollettino di Paletnologia Italiana and, in the same year, began working in the Archaeological Director General's office in Rome (Direzione Generale dei Musei e degli Scavi d'Antichità del Regno a Roma) where he proposed to the Minister of Public education, Bonghi, the foundation of the Pigorini National Museum of Prehistory and Ethnography in Rome, that was inaugurated in 1876 and which bears his name. For his outstanding contribution to Italian archaeology he was nominated a Senatore a vita in 1912 and was vice president of the Italian Senate in 1919 remaining so until his death in Padua in 1925.

== Achievements ==
Pigorini's work with Strobel on the lake-dwelling Terramara is a seminal work of prehistory informed by uniting paleontology, botany, zoology, entomology, palynology, geology, anthropology and archaeology to build a complete picture of these Bronze Age communities.

== Selected works ==
- with Strobel Le terremare e le palafitte del Parmense (subtitle) seconda relazione del prof. P. Strobel e di L. Pigorini Tipi di G. Bernadoni, Milano (1864) - also in parts in Atti della Società italiana di Scienze Naturali (Milan).
- with Lubbock, John. Notes on the hut-urns and other objects discovered in an ancient cemetery in the commune of Marino (province of Rome) [read to the Society of Antiquaries 2 April 1868], Archaeologia 42: 103— (1868)
- 'Inchiesta sul Museo di Villa Giulia ', Supplemento al Bollettino Ufficiale del Ministero dell'Istruzione Pubblica 26 (1899) (ed. L. Pigorini), 1107-1142 (1899)
- 'Pani di rame provenienti dall'Egeo e scoperti a Serra Ilixi in provincia di Cagliari', Bollettino di Paletnologia Italiana 10: 91-107 (1904).
- A complete list of Pignori's papers in Bollettino di Paletnologia Italiana is here: contents

== Sources ==
- Duhn, Friedrich von Rellini, U. Necrologio del prof. L. Pigorini Vorgeschichtliches Jahrbuch, 3:274. Berlin, 1927.
- Brizzi, Bruno [ed.] 1976 The Pigorini Museum Rome, Quasar.
- Italian Wikipedia
