= Chierico =

Chierico is an Italian surname. In Italian this name translates to "cleric". Notable people with the surname include:

- Francesco di Antonio del Chierico (1433–1484), Italian manuscript illuminator
- Odoacre Chierico (born 1959), Italian footballer and manager
- Luca Chierico (born 2001, Italian footballer, son of Odoacre

== See also ==
- Chierici, surname
- Monte Chierico, a mountain of Lombardy, Italy
