= Filippo Bigioli =

Italian painter

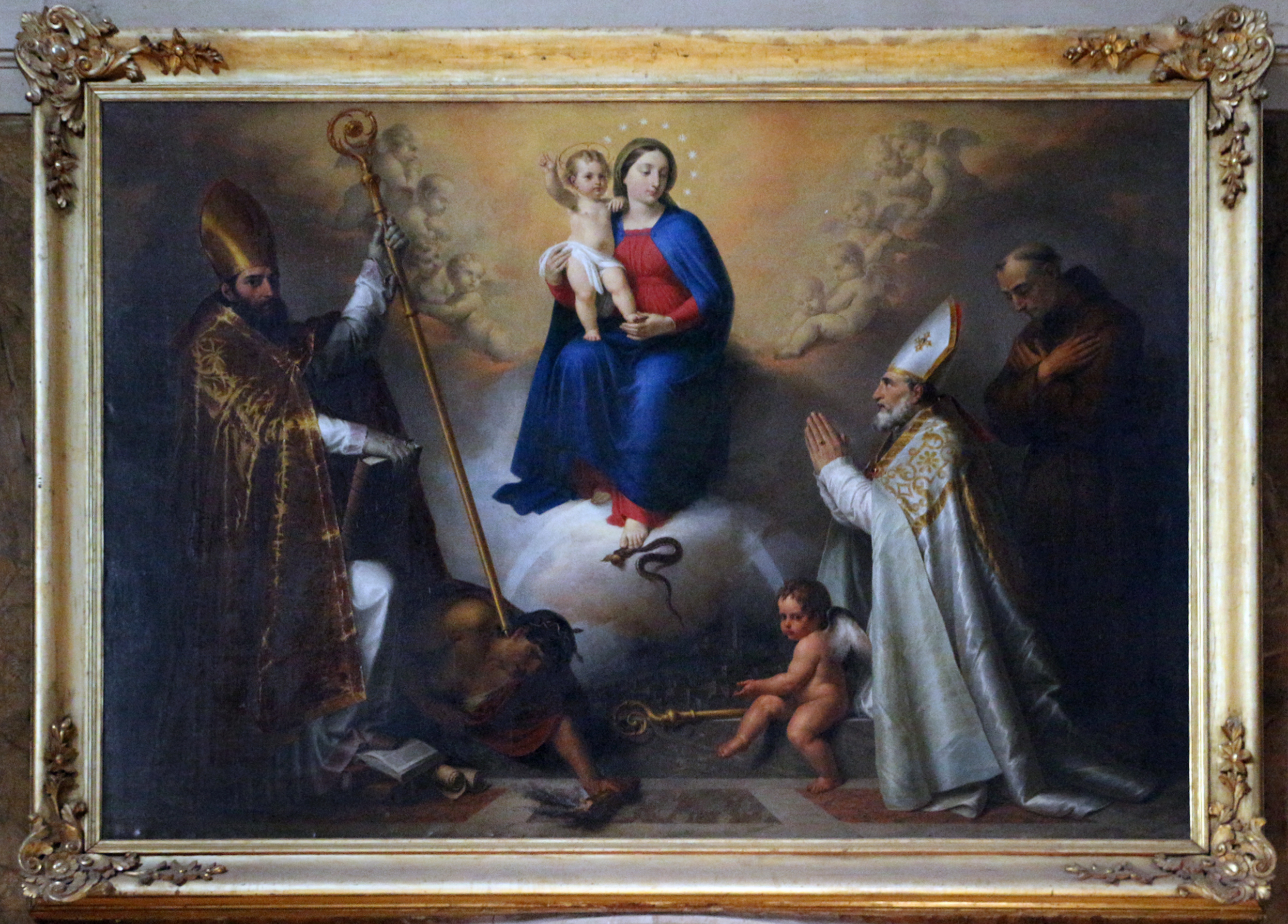
Filippo Bigioli Portrait

Filippo Bigioli (San Severino Marche, June 4, 1798 - 1878) was an Italian painter, active in a late neoclassical style

== Biography ==
In 1861, he painted a series of over two dozen large canvases for a Galleria Dantesca about Dante and his works, most of which were exhibited initially in the Palazzo Altieri in Rome, but later when on tour, including to London. He was helped in the planning by Romualdo Gentilucci, and coloring by Vincenzo Paliotti, Guerra, and professor Alfonso Chierici. He helped fresco the palace (destroyed) and villa of Count Torlonia in Rome. A collection of his works is on display in the Palazzo Comunale of San Severino.

His adopted daughter, Luisa Martignoni Bigioli, was also a painter.
