= List of works by Gaetano Chierici =

List of works by Gaetano Chierici is an incomplete list of paintings and other works by the Italian artist Gaetano Chierici (1838–1920).

== Paintings ==
Image Title	Date	Current location	Medium, Dimensions	Notes
Portrait of Giuseppe Mazzini	1862 - 63	Tricolour Flag Museum, Reggio Emilia	Oil on canvas	
The lesson at the convent	1864	Gallerie di Piazza Scala, Milan	Oil	
First steps	1865	Galleria d'Arte Moderna, Genoa	Oil	
An opportune moment	1866	Ottocento Art Gallery, Rome	Oil on canvas 51 x 65 cm	
Portrait of Eugenio Bianchini, garibaldian volunteer	1868	Museo del Tricolore, Reggio Emilia	Oil	
The instinct to arms	1868	Gallerie di Piazza Scala, Milan	Oil	
The veteran II	c. 1870	Private collection	Oil	
Feeding time	1870	Private collection	Oil on canvas 73.5 x 104 cm	
The first steps	1871	Private collection	Oil on canvas 55 x 77 cm	
Child feeding her pets	1872	Widener University Art Museum Alfred O. Deshong Collection, Chester, Pennsylvania	Oil	
The baby's food	1872	Private collection	Oil on canvas 75.7 x 107.3 cm	
The mask. Fun and fright	1874	Private collection	Oil on canvas 76 x 109 cm	In 1888 it was at the Corcoran Gallery of Art in Washington D.C.
Childhood pains	1875	Private collection	Oil on canvas laid on board 40 x 55 cm	
Children and doll	1878	Private collection	Oil on canvas 69.9 x 52 cm	
The veteran	1878	Private collection	Oil on canvas laid on board 91 x 108 cm	
A tamer	1878	Unknown location	Oil	
Self-portrait	1881	Uffizi Gallery, Florence	Oil on painter's palette	
A propitious moment	1882	Unknown	Oil	
Hasty pudding	1883	Widener University Art Museum Alfred O. Deshong Collection, Chester, Pennsylvania	Oil on canvas	
The good stepmother	1885	Museo Borgogna, Vercelli	Oil on canvas 93.4 x 119.5 cm	
A young war hero	c. 1888			
Surprised!	1888	Private collection	Oil on canvas 115 x 155 cm	
Boys, chicks and kittens	1889	Museo Borgogna, Vercelli	Oil on canvas 96 x 121.5 cm	
The young mom. Childhood joys	c. 1890 – c. 1895	Private collection	Oil on canvas 45 x 63 cm	
The Boogey Man	1891			
A game of trumps - in embarrassment	c. 1897	Private collection	Oil on canvas 45 x 60 cm	
The mother hen	c. 1897	Galleria Antonio Fontanesi, Reggio Emilia	Oil	
Brotherly affection	c. 1900	Private collection	Oil on canvas 33 x 42 cm	
The baby's bath	c. 1908	Unknown	Oil	
The mask		Private collection	Oil on canvas 71 x 97 cm	Very similar to The mask. Fun and fright painted in 1874.
Irresistible force		Private collection	Oil on panel 34.5 x 46 cm	
The cradle		Private collection	Oil on canvas 47 x 58.4	
The baby's food		Private collection	Oil on canvas 47 x 58.4	
Cats and rabbit		Unknown	Oil	
Children and chicken		Unknown	Oil	
Mother's pride. Family with cats		Private collection	Oil on canvas 57.8 x 69.8 cm	
The mask		Unknown	Oil	Very similar to The Boogey Man, painted in 1891.
A frightening state of affairs		Unknown	Oil	

== Sources ==
"Gaetano Chierici". artnet.com.

"Sold at Auction: Gaetano (1838) Chierici". invaluable.com.

"Chierici Gaetano". Lombardiabeniculturali.it.

"Gaetano Chierici 1838/1920". Catalogo.beniculturali.it.
