= Giulio Cesare Ferrari =

Italian painter

Giulio Cesare Ferrari (1818-1899) was an Italian painter of the Neoclassical style.

He studied at the Academy of Fine Arts of Bologna under Clemente Alberi and Napoleone Angiolini. He began exhibiting in 1836, influenced by Rodolfo Fantuzzi. In 1844, along with Alessandro Guardassoni, he moved to Modena working with Adeodato Malatesta, painting historic and genre subjects.

Among his pupils was Gaetano Chierici.
