= Terramare culture =

Archaeological culture in Northern Italy

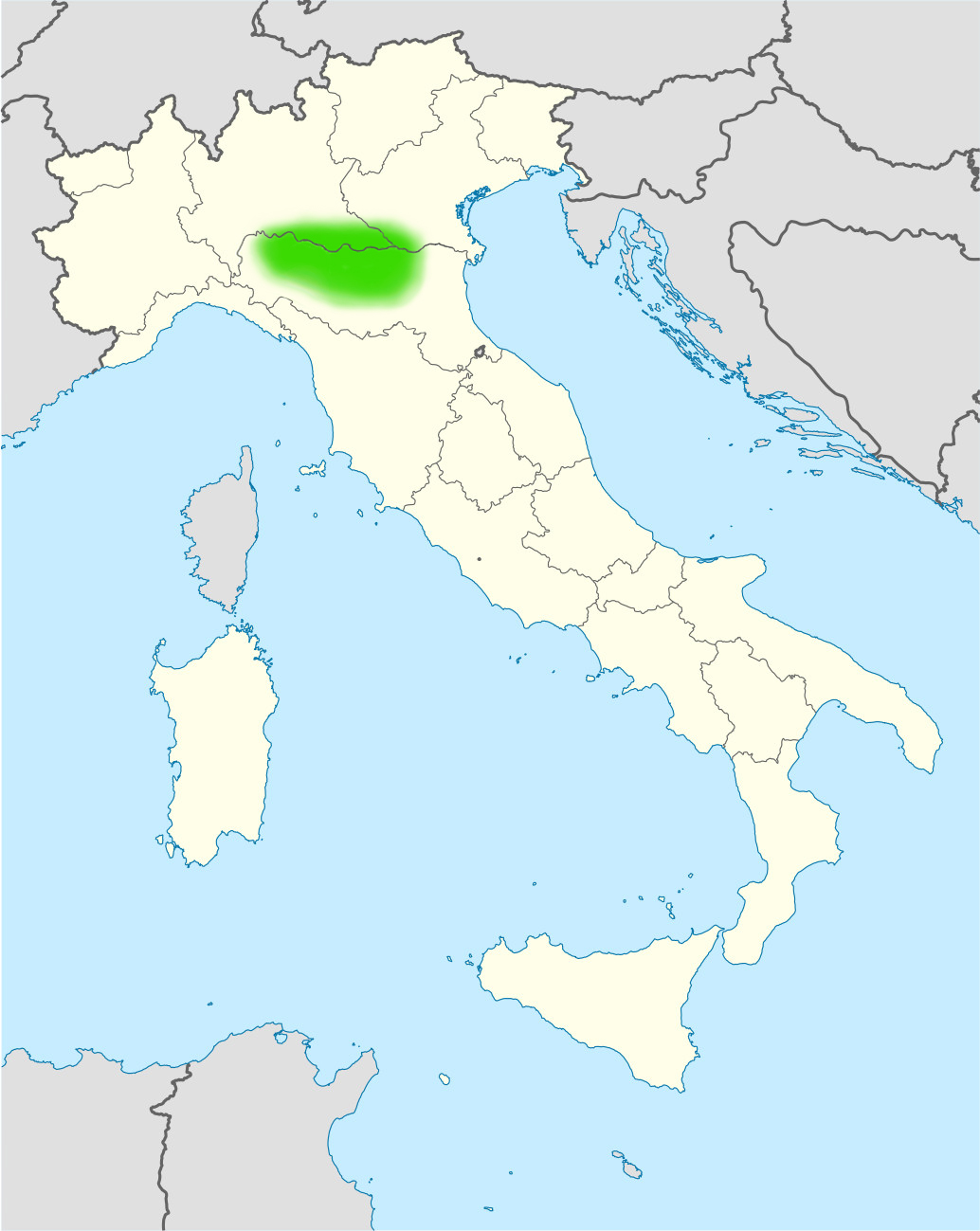
- Geographical range: Northern Italy
- Period: Bronze Age
- Dates: c. 1700 — c. 1150 BC
- Major sites: Terramare of Montale
- Preceded by: Polada culture
- Followed by: Proto-Villanovan culture

Terramare, terramara, or terremare is a technology complex mainly of the central Po Valley, in Emilia, Northern Italy, dating to the Middle and Late Bronze Age c. 1700–1150 BC. It takes its name from the "black earth" residue of settlement mounds. Terramare is from terra marna, "marl-earth", where marl is a lacustrine deposit. It may be any color but in agricultural lands it is most typically black, giving rise to the "black earth" identification of it. The population of the terramare sites is called the terramaricoli. The sites were excavated exhaustively in 1860–1910.

These sites prior to the second half of the 19th century were commonly believed to have been used for Gallic and Roman sepulchral rites. They were called terramare and marnier by the farmers of the region, who mined the soil for fertilizer. Scientific study began with Bartolomeo Gastaldi in 1860. He was investigating peat bogs and old lake sites in north Italy but did some investigations of the marnier, recognizing them finally as habitation, not funerary, sites similar to the pile dwellings further north.

His studies attracted the attention of Pellegrino Strobel and his 18-year-old assistant, Luigi Pigorini. In 1862 they wrote a piece concerning the Castione di Marchesi in Parma, a Terramare site. They were the first to perceive that the settlements were prehistoric. Starting from Gaetano Chierici's theory that the pile dwellings further north represented an ancestral Roman population, Pigorini developed a theory of Indo-European settlement of Italy from the north.

The Terramare system collapsed around 1150 BC, resulting in the abandonment of many settlements and the dispersal of populations. Some researchers have suggested that this population dispersal contributed to the development of subsequent cultural formations, including Proto-Villanovan communities.

== Settlements ==
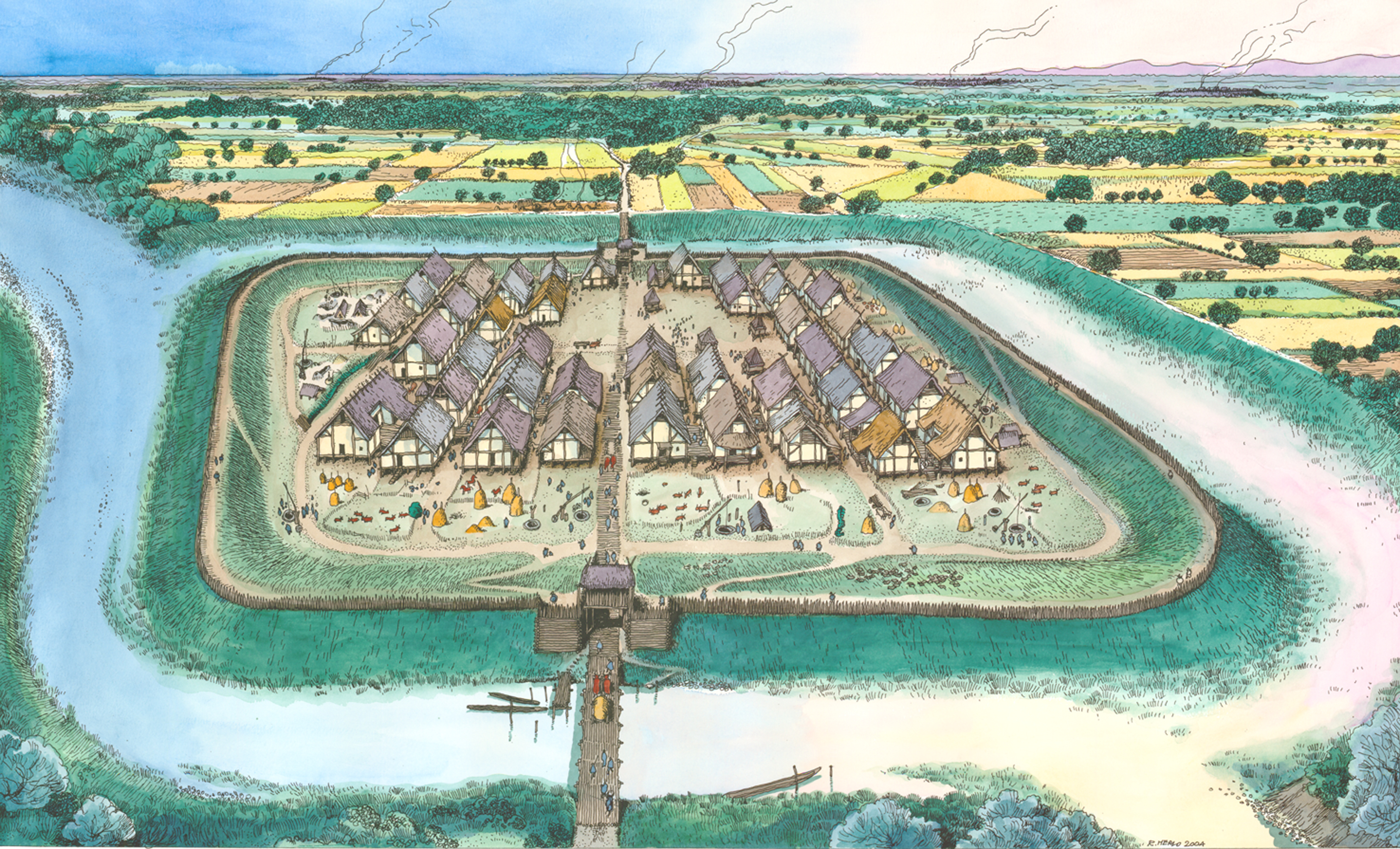
Terramare of Montale, reconstruction

The Terramare, in spite of local differences, is of typical form; each settlement is trapezoidal, with streets arranged in a quadrangular pattern. Some houses are built upon piles even though the village is entirely on dry land. There is currently no commonly accepted explanation for the piles. The whole is protected by an earthwork strengthened on the inside by buttresses, and encircled by a wide moat supplied with running water. In all over 60 villages are known, almost entirely from Emilia. In the Middle Bronze Age they are no larger than 2 ha (4.9 acres) placed at an average density of 1 per 25 km^{2} (9.7 sq mi). In the Late Bronze Age many sites have been abandoned and the ones that were not are larger, up to 60 ha (150 acres).

The remains discovered may be briefly summarized. Stone objects are few. Of bronze (the chief material) axes, daggers, swords, razors, and knives are found, as also minor implements, such as sickles, needles, pins, brooches, etc. Also remarkable is the finding of a large number of stone moulds, needed to obtain the bronze objects. There are also objects of bone and wood, besides pottery (both coarse and fine), amber, and glass paste. Small clay figures, chiefly of animals (though human figures are found at Castellazzo), are interesting as being practically the earliest specimens of plastic art found in Italy.

== Society ==
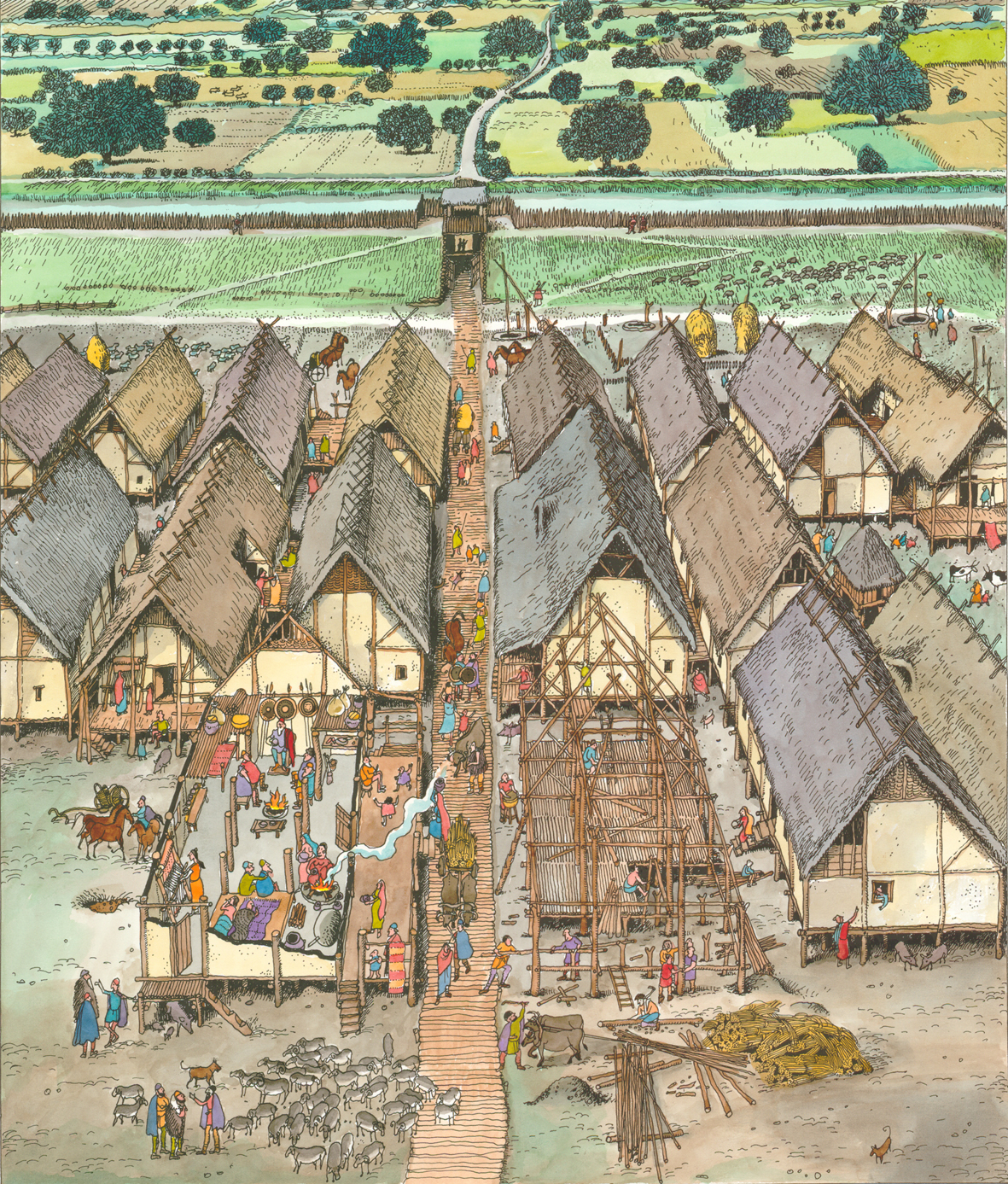
Terramare of Montale, reconstruction

The economy of the Terramare culture was based primarily on agriculture and animal husbandry, although hunting, fishing, and the gathering of wild resources remained of some importance. The Terramare people raised sheep, goats, pigs, and cattle, and were skilled metalworkers; they crafted tools, weapons, and ornaments out of bronze, using stone molds and, more rarely, clay molds. Agriculture focused largely on cereals, with wheat and barley as the primary crops, supplemented by legumes such as fava beans and lentils. Noteworthy was the introduction of common millet, around 1500 BC, as a food source for humans and, occasionally, as fodder for domestic animals (a development in line with trends observed in the middle Danube region). They also exploited grapevines, which were probably cultivated at some settlements, although their domestication remains uncertain.

At the beginning of the Terramare period, a significant decrease in disease and metabolic stress across all levels of society, likely resulting from improved nutritional conditions fostered by innovations in agricultural production, coincided with exceptionally rapid population growth during the Middle and Late Bronze Age, particularly in its later phases. This increase appears too substantial to be explained entirely by the growth of the local population, suggesting an influx from surrounding areas. Archaeological evidence suggests that migration from the Pannonian Plain and the regions north of the Alps may have been a contributing factor to this expansion. Such a phenomenon would reflect both a high availability of food surpluses and an extraordinary demand for the labor required to construct and maintain the large-scale infrastructure. In the Recent Bronze Age, long distance mobility appears to have decreased, likely as a consequence of the increasing saturation and hierarchization of the settlement system.

During the earlier phases, both inhumation and cremation were practised, with cremated remains collected in ceramic ossuaries and deposited in cemeteries outside settlements. The people of the Terramare Culture gradually adopted cremation as their primary funerary practice by approximately 1450 BCE, placing the ashes of the deceased in urns that were subsequently buried in cemeteries known as urnfields. The earliest examples of urnfield cemeteries, however, can be traced to central Hungary, where they emerged around 2000 BCE among the tell communities associated with the late Nagyrév and Vatya cultures. Following the decline of the tell system around 1500 BCE, the urnfield tradition spread into neighbouring regions, although its adoption appears to have been particularly pronounced in the southern Po Valley and the Sava, Drava, and Lower Tisza plains.

Between approximately 1200 and 1150 BCE, the Terramare Culture collapsed alongside several other established civilizations across the Mediterranean, as part of a period of widespread upheaval known as the Late Bronze Age Collapse. This crisis resulted in the abandonment and, in some areas, almost complete depopulation of the Po Valley, suggesting that many Terramare communities were forced to leave the region. Significantly, it was around this same period that cremation practices began to spread southwards into the Italian peninsula, contributing to the emergence of the cultural tradition known as Proto-Villanovan. In the region surrounding Rome, this tradition subsequently developed into the Latial Culture, which is generally regarded as representing one of the earliest cultural foundations of Roman society.

== Development and collapse ==
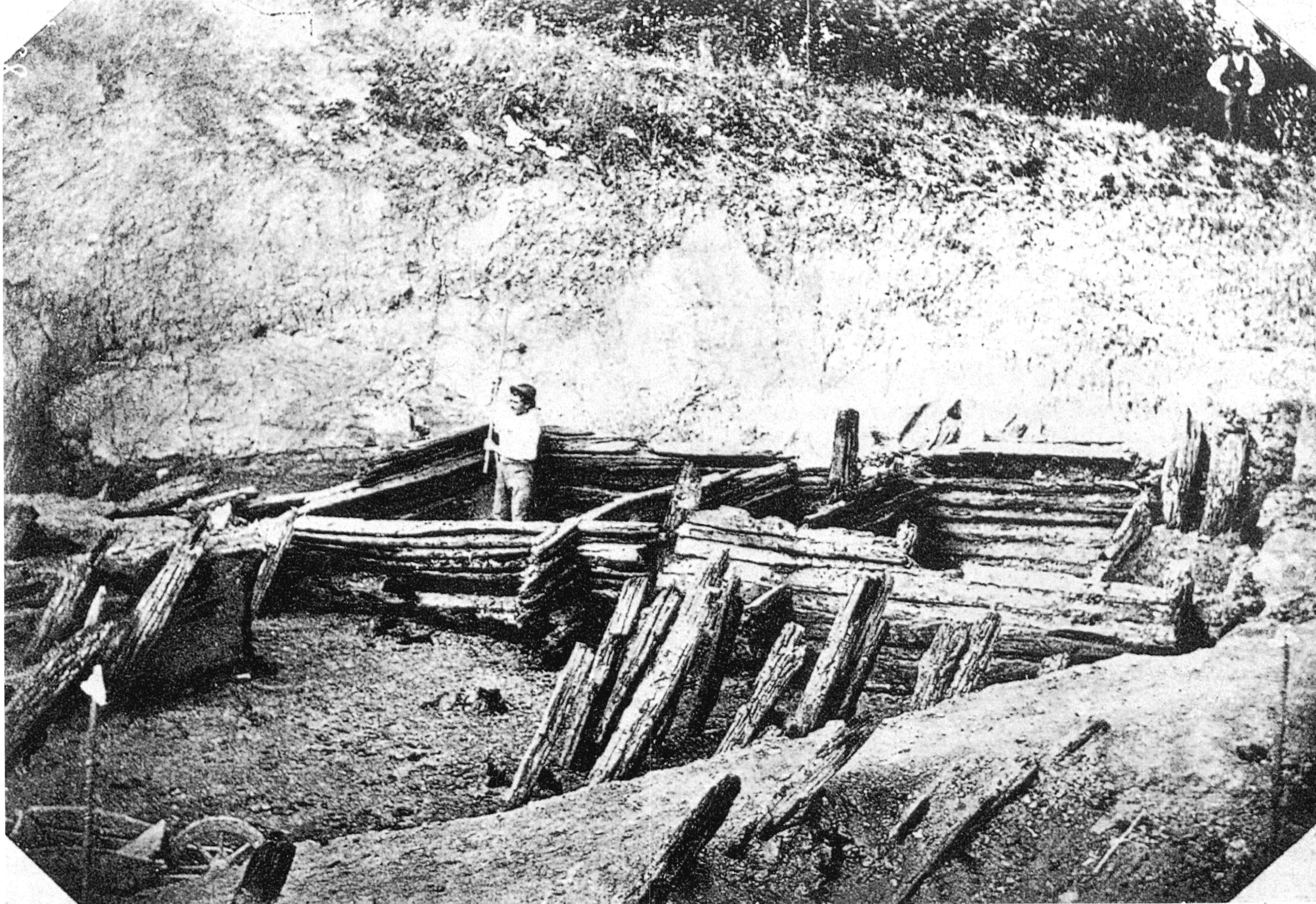
Excavations at the Terramere of Castione Marchesi, 1877

During the early phases of the Middle Bronze Age, the Terramare appear to have constituted a relatively decentralised, polycentric settlement system, characterised by a network of broadly comparable villages. From approximately 1600 BCE onwards, contacts between the Pannonian/Hungarian Plain and the Po Valley became increasingly extensive. The close interaction between these two regions is reflected in the parallel development of their metalworking traditions, as well as in their development at all levels of society, and in various aspects of their funerary practices.

The density of dwellings rose, and in the MB2 (1550–1450 BC) is worthy of note. There are areas, coinciding with those that have been most extensively investigated, in which the inhabited settlements in this phase are no more than 2 kilometres one from the other. It can therefore be supposed that the entire territory was occupied by a tight-knit network of villages, a polycentric system with settlements generally covering between 1 and 2 hectares and occupied by up to 250/260 inhabitants (about 125 per hectare). At that point, the dimension of the settlements began to vary. Until the MB2, their size did not normally exceed two hectares, but during the MB3 (1450–1350 BC), there was a substantial increase in the surface area occupied by certain of these settlements, while others remained limited in size or disappeared altogether. This tendency was consolidated in the LBA. Several of these settlements cover an area of up to 20 hectares. The size of the embankments and ditches can reach remarkable proportions, some exceeding 30 metres in width. For the more advanced phase of the Middle Bronze Age, and above all during the Late Bronze Age (1350–1150 BC), we can hypothesise a greater degree of diversified territorial organisation, including centres which are larger and tending towards hegemony, adjacent to smaller sites. In certain areas during the LBA, we see a higher frequency of sites occupying a larger extension and a scant presence of small-size settlements, perhaps due to a marked tendency towards concentration of population. This trend seems to be accentuated during the advanced LBA, when the overall number of settlements decreases, with a tendency towards concentration in larger-size settlements and probable subordination of the smaller settlements to the larger ones.

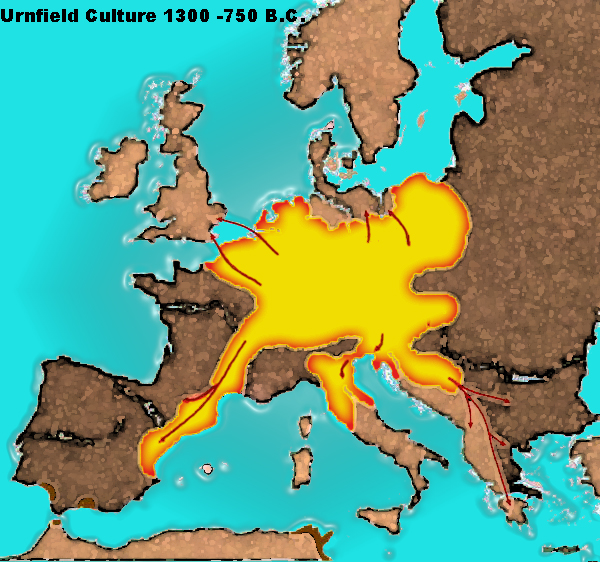
Urnfield-related migrations

Around 1200 BC, a severe crisis began for the Terramare culture, which, within a few years, led to the mass abandonment of its settlements. The reasons for this crisis, roughly contemporaneous with the Late Bronze Age collapse in the eastern Mediterranean, are still not entirely clear. It seems possible that in the face of an incipient overpopulation (between 150,000 and 200,000 individuals were calculated) and depletion of natural resources, a series of drought periods led to a deep economic crisis, famine, and consequently the disruption of the political order, which caused the collapse of society. Some also hypothesize that the crisis and subsequent depopulation of the Hungarian Plain, around 1200 BC, may have triggered a large-scale migration toward the south. This massive influx of people, they suggest, could have placed additional pressure on the already ecologically strained Terramare society, contributing to its eventual collapse. Around 1150 BC, possibly within the span of just a few decades, the Terramare civilization collapsed, resulting in a dramatic decline in the number of settlements, which fell to less than a quarter of their previous total north of the Po River, while most sites south of the river were completely abandoned. These developments ultimately led to the widespread dispersal of the Terramare population, with more than 100,000 people leaving their homes. The plains, especially in the area of Emilia, were abandoned for several centuries, and only in the Roman era did they regain the density of population reached during the Terramare period.

The collapse of the Terramare civilization triggered a widespread dispersal of its population across the Italian peninsula, with significant numbers settling in other regions, while some groups may have eventually become part of the Sea Peoples. The distribution of Terramare-style pottery in northern Tuscany, Romagna, Umbria, and the Marche, suggests that these regions received substantial groups of Terramare migrants. Further evidence of this movement can be found in Campania, where elements of Terramare ceramic traditions are also attested at several settlements. Moreover, cremation followed by burial in urnfields had already become widespread at Terramare sites by approximately 1450 BCE. The subsequent diffusion of this funerary practice across the Italian peninsula coincides with the period of the Terramare diaspora and marks the emergence of the Urnfield horizon in Italy.

== Theories of ethnic identity ==
Significant differences of opinion have arisen as to the origin and ethnographic relations of the Terramare population.

Edoardo Brizio, in his Epoca preistorica (1898), advanced a theory that the Terramare population had been the original Ligurians. Brizio believed that the Ligures, at some early point, took to erecting pile dwellings, although why they should have abandoned their previously unprotected hut-settlements for elaborate fortifications is unclear. While Brizio did not envision invading peoples until long after the Terramare period, the pile dwellings, ramparts and moats at Terramare sites have usually seemed more akin to military defenses, than the prevention of inundation during regular flooding; for instance, Terramare buildings usually stood on hills. There are other difficulties of a similar character with Brizio's theory.

Luigi Pigorini (1842–1925) proposed that a population derived from the Terramare culture was a dominant component of the Proto-Villanovan culture—especially in its northern and Campanian phases and the Terramare culture has been an Indo-European-speaking population, the ancestors of the Italici, i.e. the Italic-speaking peoples. Pigorini also attributed to the Italici a tradition of lake dwellings, modified in Italy into Terramare-style pile dwelling on dry land.

More recently, Italian archaeologist Andrea Cardarelli has suggested that Dionysius of Halicarnassus’s account of the Pelasgians preserves a pre-Roman Italic mytho-historical tradition recalling the collapse of the Terramare culture. He rejects any ethnic continuity between Terramare populations and Pelasgians, arguing that Dionysius superimposed a Greek ethnic identity on an earlier Italic tradition. He notes parallels between the narrative and archaeological evidence of environmental degradation, prolonged drought, social conflict and population displacement around the 12th century BC.

== List of sites ==
- Santa Rosa di Poviglio, in Poviglio - see Terramare of Santa Rosa
- Fondo Paviani, in Legnago - see Centro ambientale archeologico di Legnago
- Case del Lago
- Case Cocconi, in Parma
- Anzola dell'Emilia

== Gallery ==
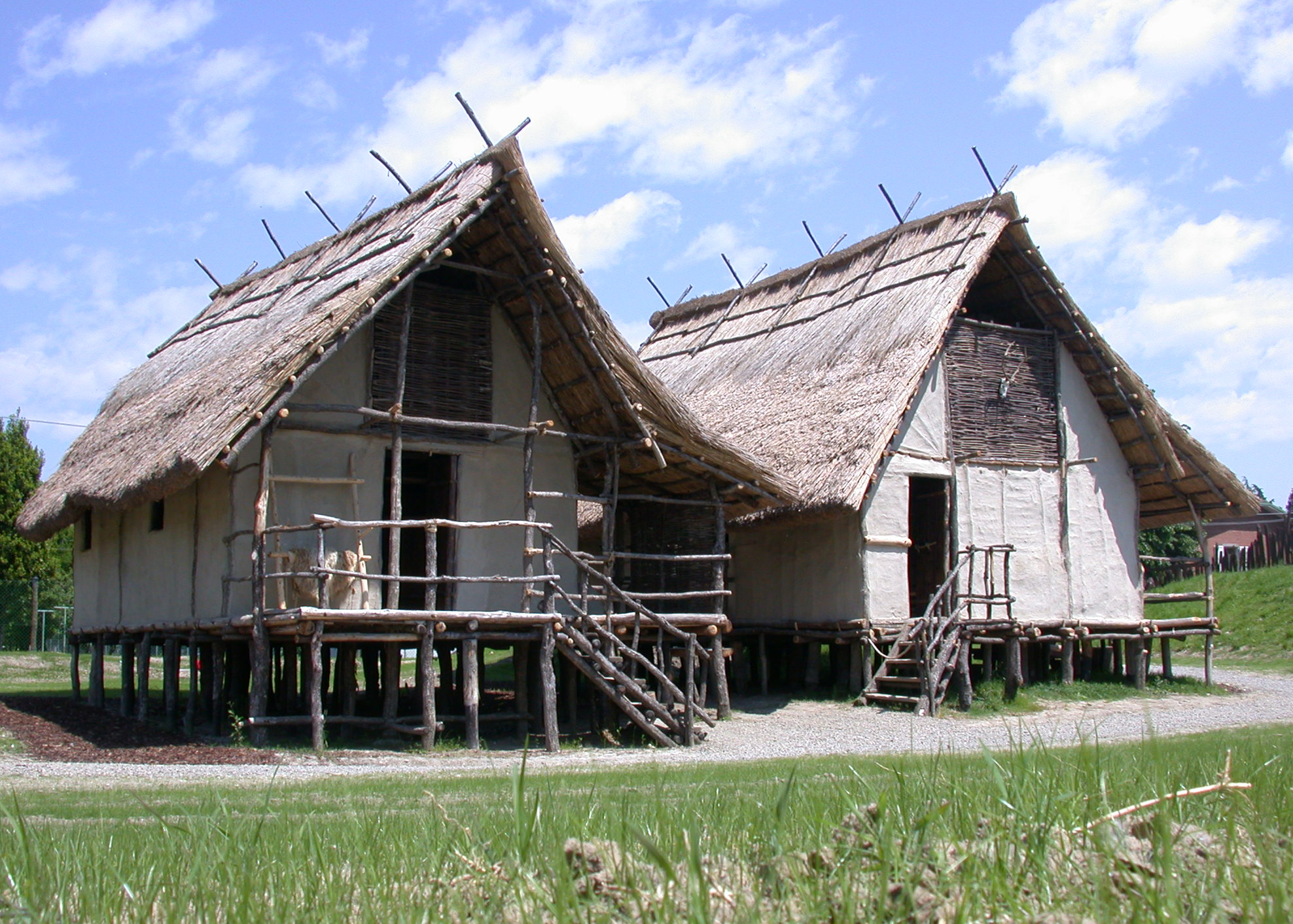
Reconstructed Terramare houses in Castelnuovo Rangone

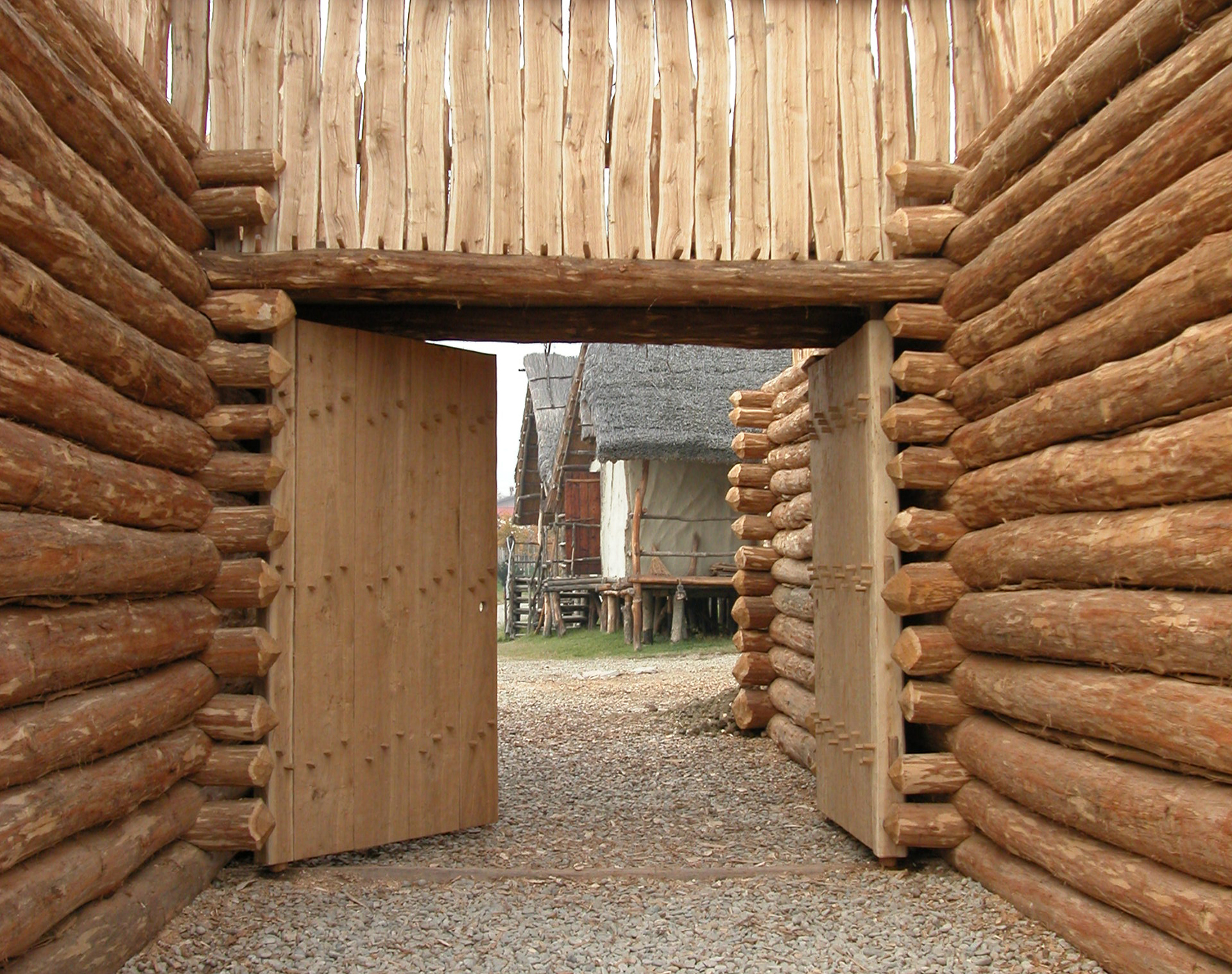
Reconstructed entrance gate

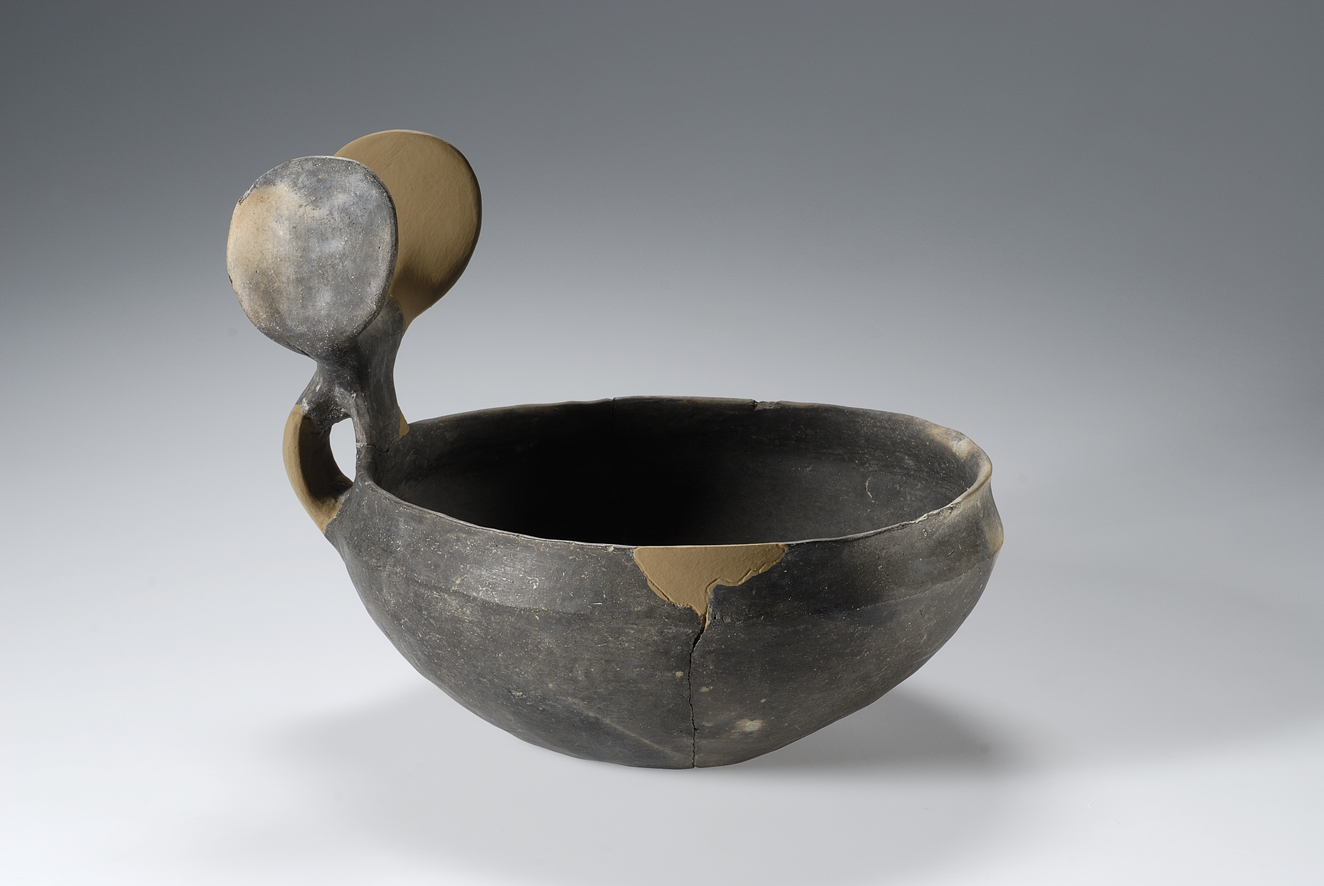
Carinated bowl

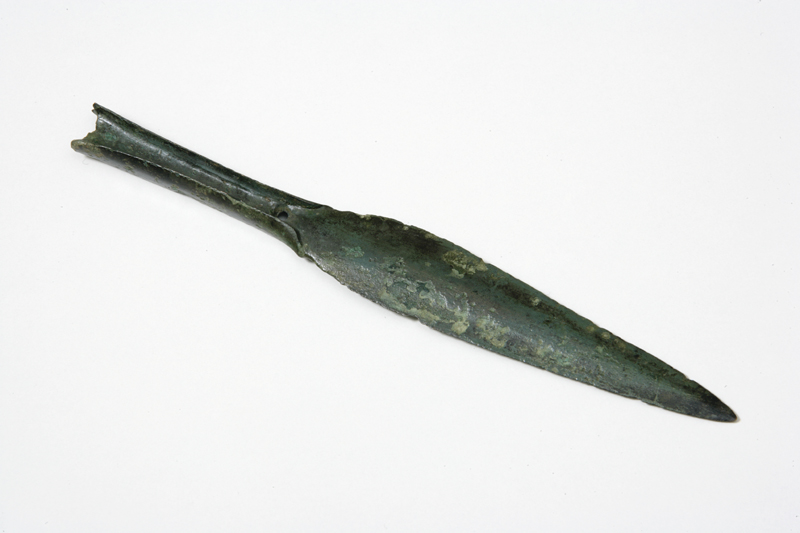
Bronze spearhead

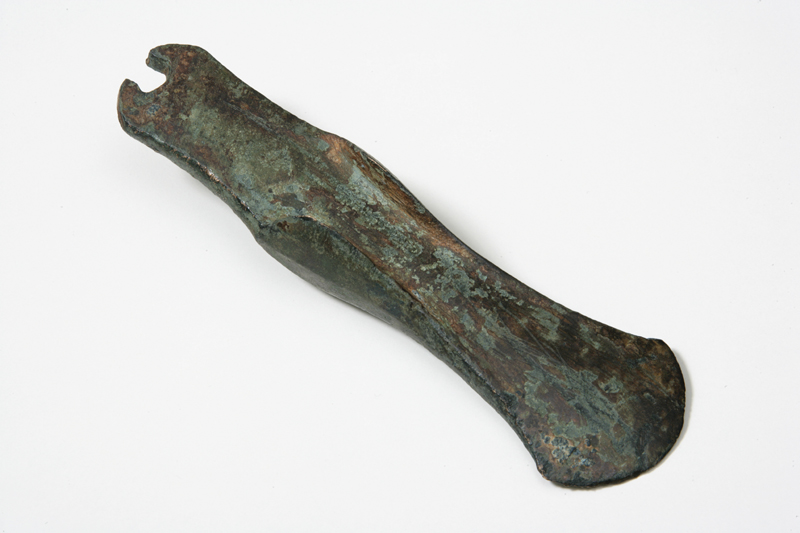
Bronze axe

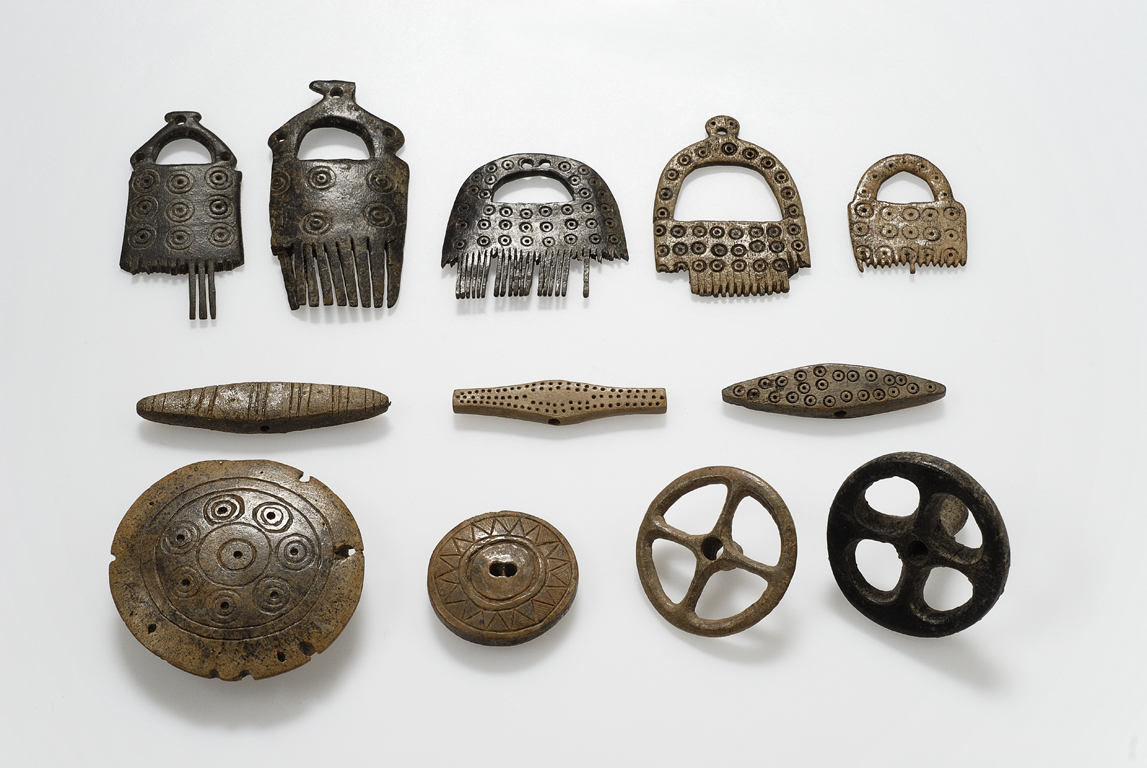
Carved bone artefacts

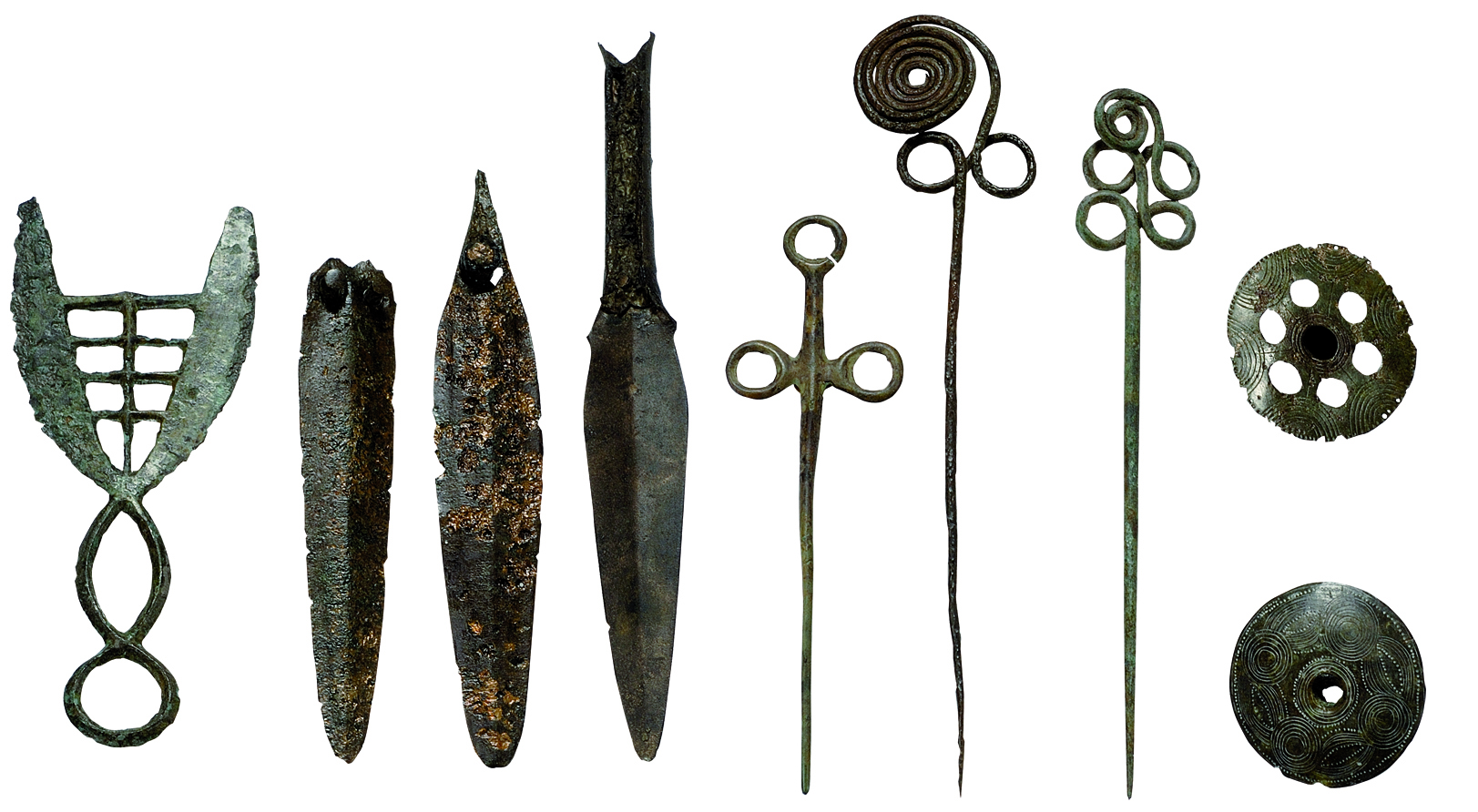
Bronze artefacts

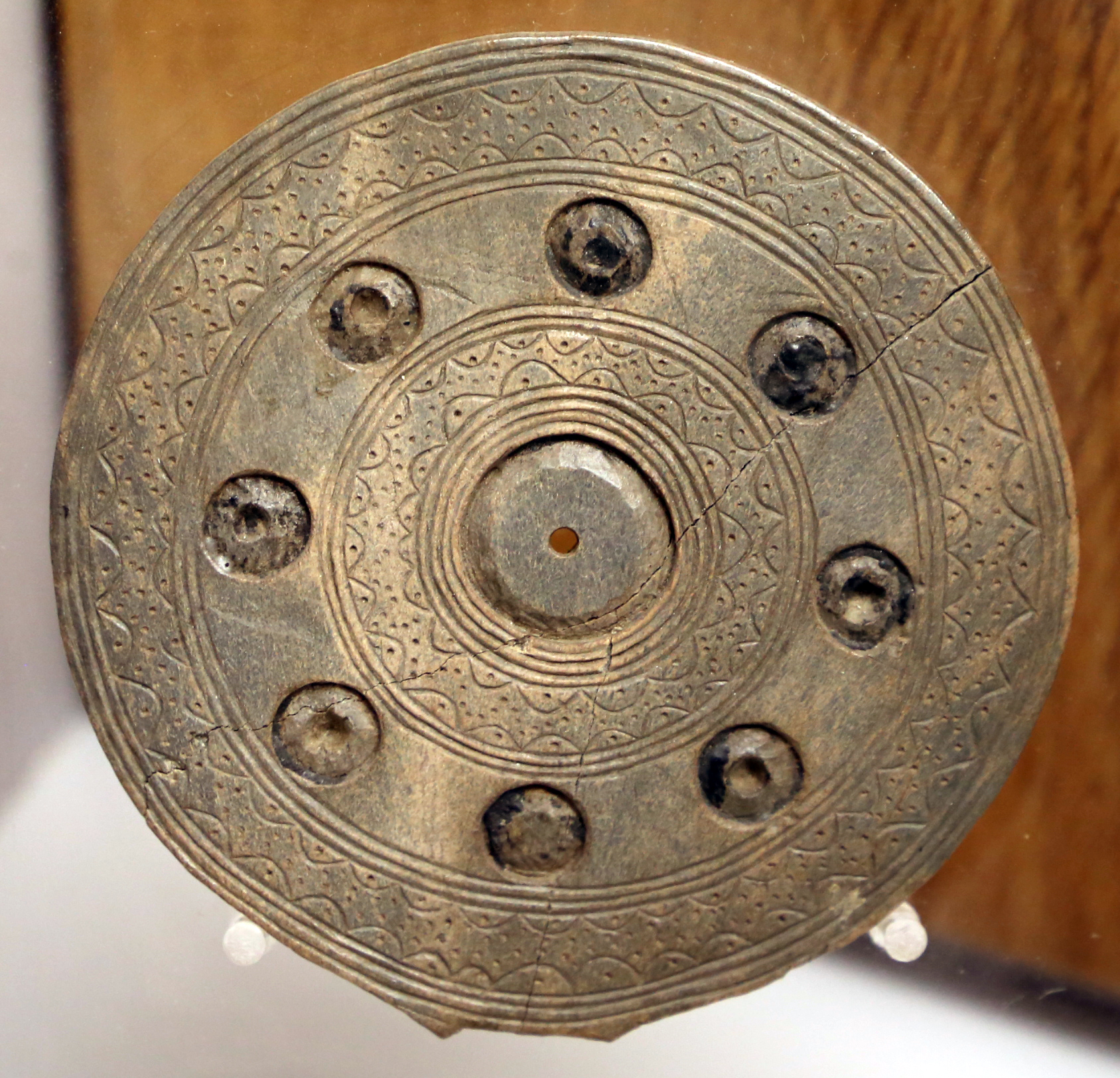
Carved disc, 16th-12th century BC

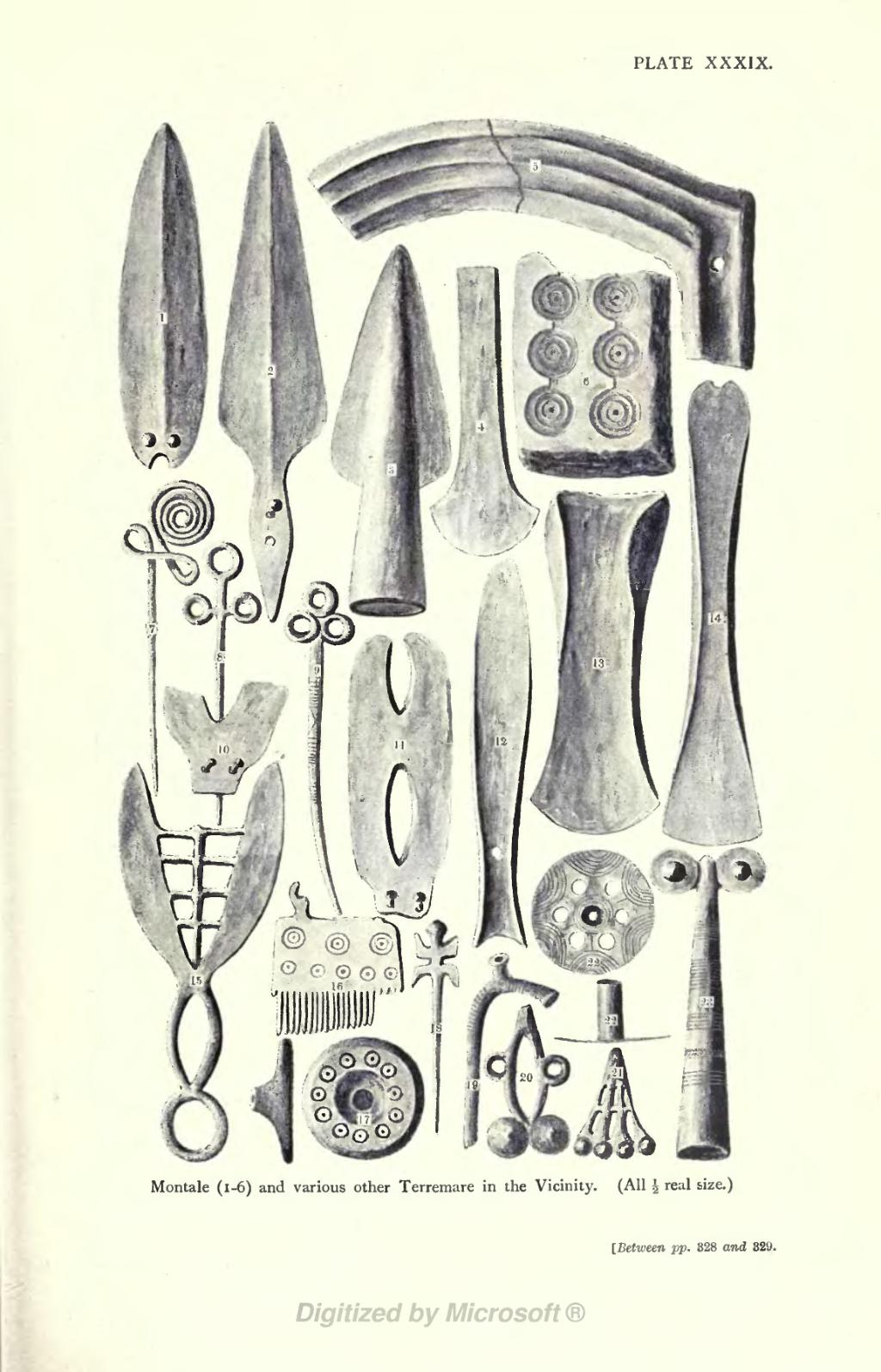
Terramare artefacts

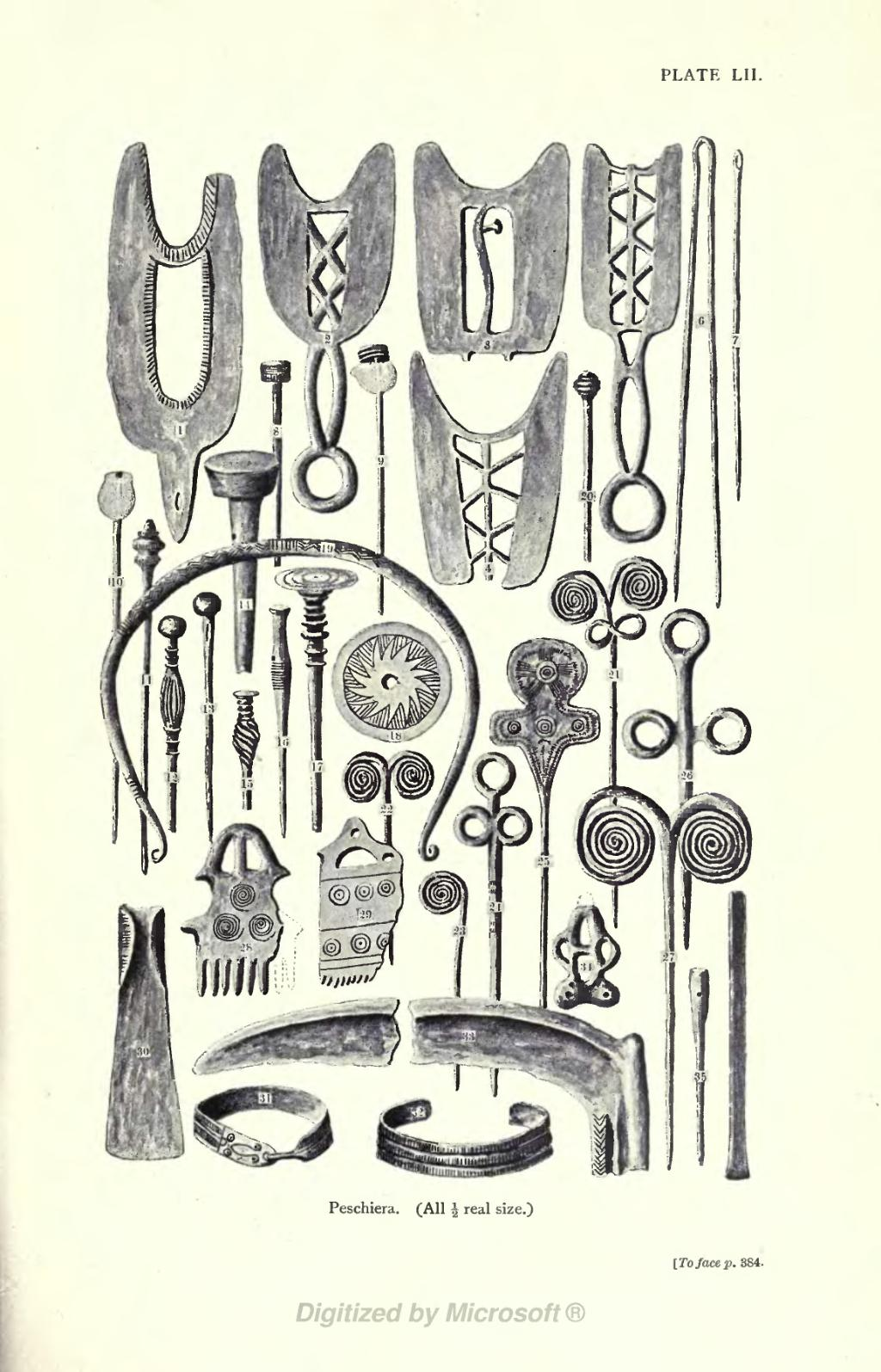
Terramare artefacts

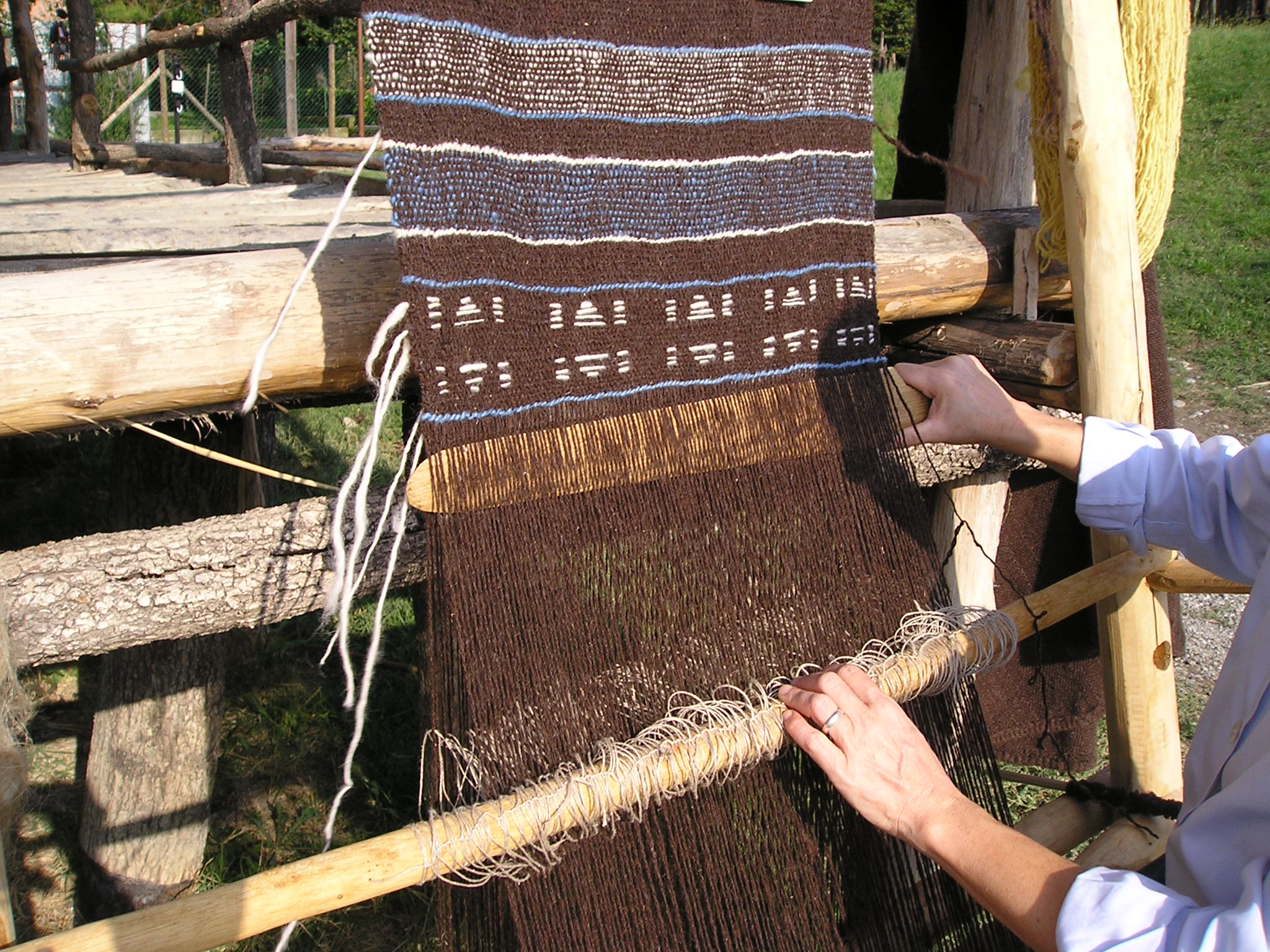
Loom weaving, reconstruction

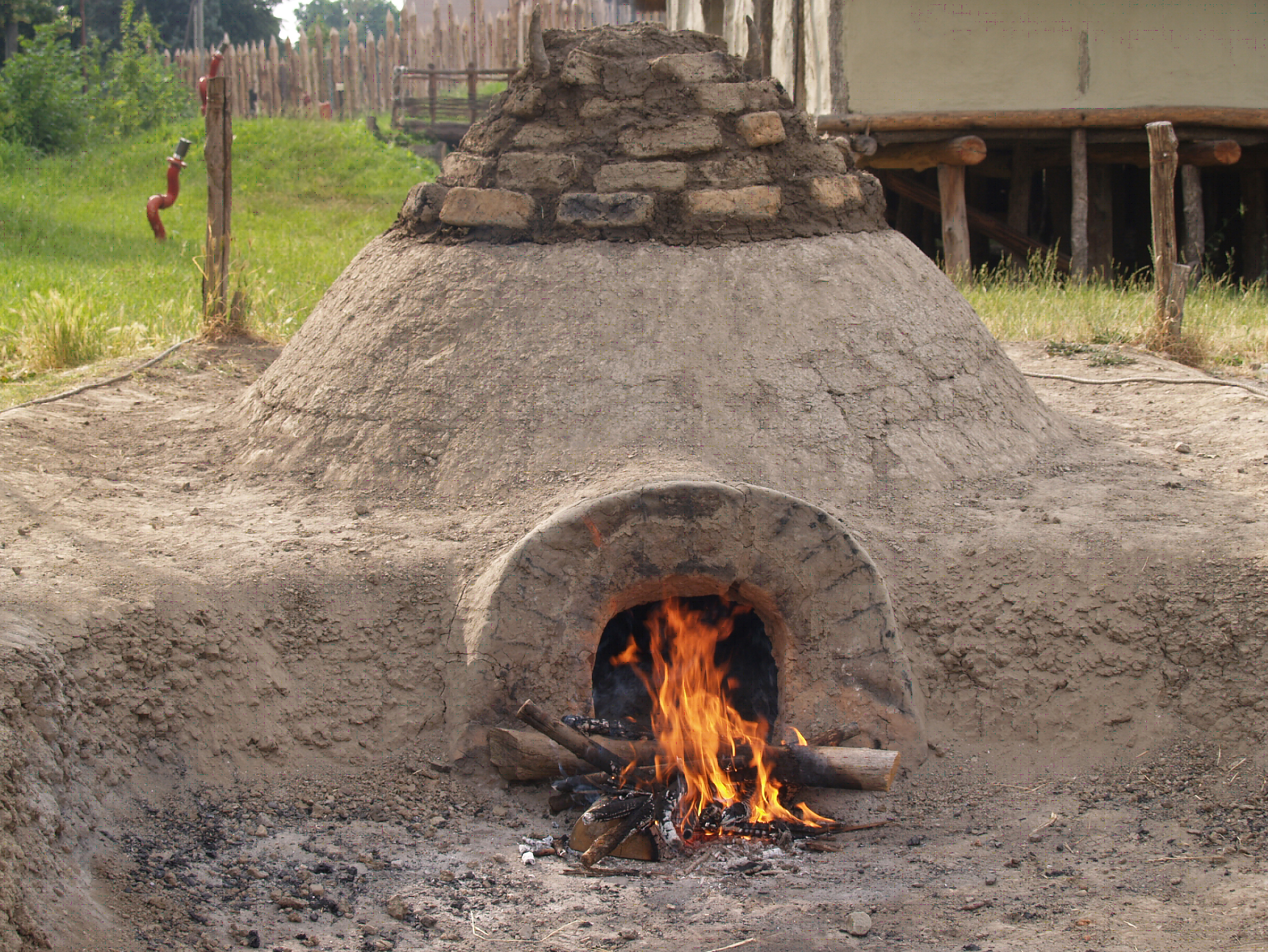
Furnace reconstruction

== See also ==
- Bronze Age Italy
- Genetic history of Italy
- Villanovan culture
- Polada culture
- Ancient peoples of Italy
- Dark earth

== Sources ==
- Mallory, J.P. (1997). "Terramare Culture". Encyclopedia of Indo-European culture. Chicago: Fitzroy Dearborn.
- Pigorini, Luigi. "Le più antiche civiltà dell'Italia". Bollettino di Paleoetnologia Italiana.
