= Francesco Angiolini =

Jesuit scholar

Francesco Angiolini (1750 – 21 February 1788) was a Jesuit scholar who translated a number of classical works into both Polish and Italian for the first time.

Angiolini was born in Piacenza, Italy, and entered the Society of Jesus in 1765, and after the suppression of the Jesuits, retired to Polotsk. Angiolini has left many works that attest to his scholarship. He is the author of a Polish grammar for the use of Italians; he wrote original poems in Italian, Latin, Greek, and Hebrew, and several comedies in Polish, and a translation from the Greek into Italian in three octavo volumes of Josephus Flavius (Florence, Paolo Fumagalli, 1840–44). Angiolini also translated into his mother tongue the Electra, Oedipus, and Antigone of Sophocles (Rome, 1782). Other works of Angiolini are an Italian translation of Thucydides, incomplete, and a Polish translation of Sophocles.

Angiolini died in Polotsk, 21 February 1788.
