= Napoleone Angiolini =

Italian painter

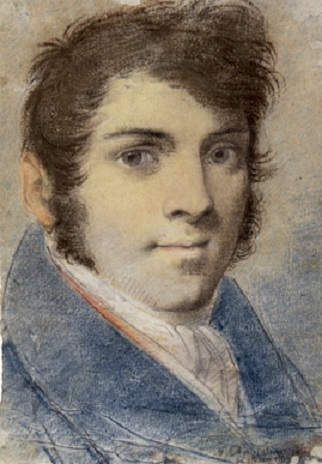
- Napoleone Angiolini portrait
- Born: 1797; Bologna
- Died: 20 June 1871 (aged 73–74)
- Education: Academy of Fine Arts of Bologna
- Notable work: portrait of Antonio Vaccari, Battle of Montagnola (August 8th)

Napoleone Angiolini (1797 – 20 June 1871) was an Italian painter.

== Biography ==
He was born in Bologna. He enrolled at the Academy of Fine Arts of Bologna, and studied under Giovanni Battista Frulli. In 1812, he won a small prize for drawing in the Sala del Nudo. In 1814, in collaboration with Gaetano Orlandi, he painted the portrait of Antonio Vaccari. Angiolini won additional academic awards in 1817, for a painting representing St John the Baptist; and in 1821, for a figure drawing. In 1824, he was awarded a four-year stipend to study in Rome, where he painted St Paul Apostle (1827), Ulysses in the House of the Shepherd Eumeo, and Socrates in Jail. He returned to Bologna in 1838 and was named professor of Elements of Figure, a position he held from 1838 to 1860.

From 1840 to 1850, he painted for the Pallavicini Centurioni family in Bologna. He completed the painting of the ceiling of San Sigismondo (1870), depicting the Blessed Imelda Lambertini and St Luigi Gonzaga. The church of Santa Maria degli Alemanni held the Presentation of Jesus in the Temple, while in the main altarpiece of the church of Villanova, Angiolini depicted the protector of the parish.

The Museum of the Risorgimento houses his painting of the Battle of Montagnola (August 8th). He aided in the restoration of the Sala Farnese del Palazzo Comunale, including the restoration in 1852 of the monument to Pope Urban VIII, which had been vandalised by Napoleonic armies. He also helped restore a painting by Marcantonio Franceschini at the Palazzo Communale, and restore the Domenico Maria Canuti and Enrico Haffner frescoes at the library of San Michele in Bosco. His masterpiece, the curtain (sipario) of the Teatro Comunale, was destroyed in 1931 by fire; only sketches and studies remain. Napoleone Angiolini died in Bologna on 20 June 1871.

Among his pupils was Giulio Cesare Ferrari.
