= Alfonso Chierici =

Italian painter (1816–1873)

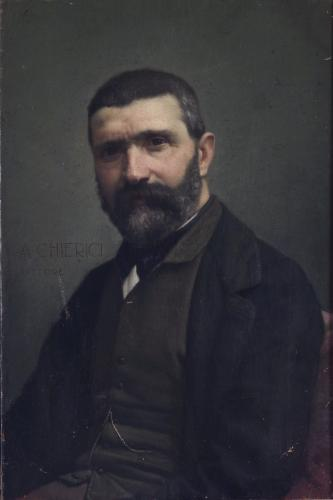
Chierici Alfonso picture

Alfonso Chierici (Reggio Emilia, 1816 - Rome, 1873) was an Italian painter, active in a late neoclassical style, mainly in Rome.

== Biography ==
His nephew Gaetano Chierici was also a painter.

From 1828 to 1832, he studied painting under Prospero Minghetti at the School of Fine Arts of Reggio. he then move to study under B. Rossi at the Academy of Fine Arts of Modena, and the next year obtained a stipend to study in Rome, where he studied under Tommaso Minardi, but also came into contact with other Romantic-style painters and contemporaries such as Francesco Hayez and Filippo Bigioli. He was commissioned by Romualdo Gentilucci to contribute to a traveling series of canvases titled the Galleria Dantesca (1861, completed with Bigioli) and Galleria Shakesperiana

Among his masterworks is The painter's studio (1836) now at the Galleria Estense in Modena and Tasso e Eleonora D'este in a private collection
