= Giovanni Chierici =

Italian sculptor (1830–1917)

Giovanni Chierici (1830–1917) was an Italian sculptor, active in Parma.

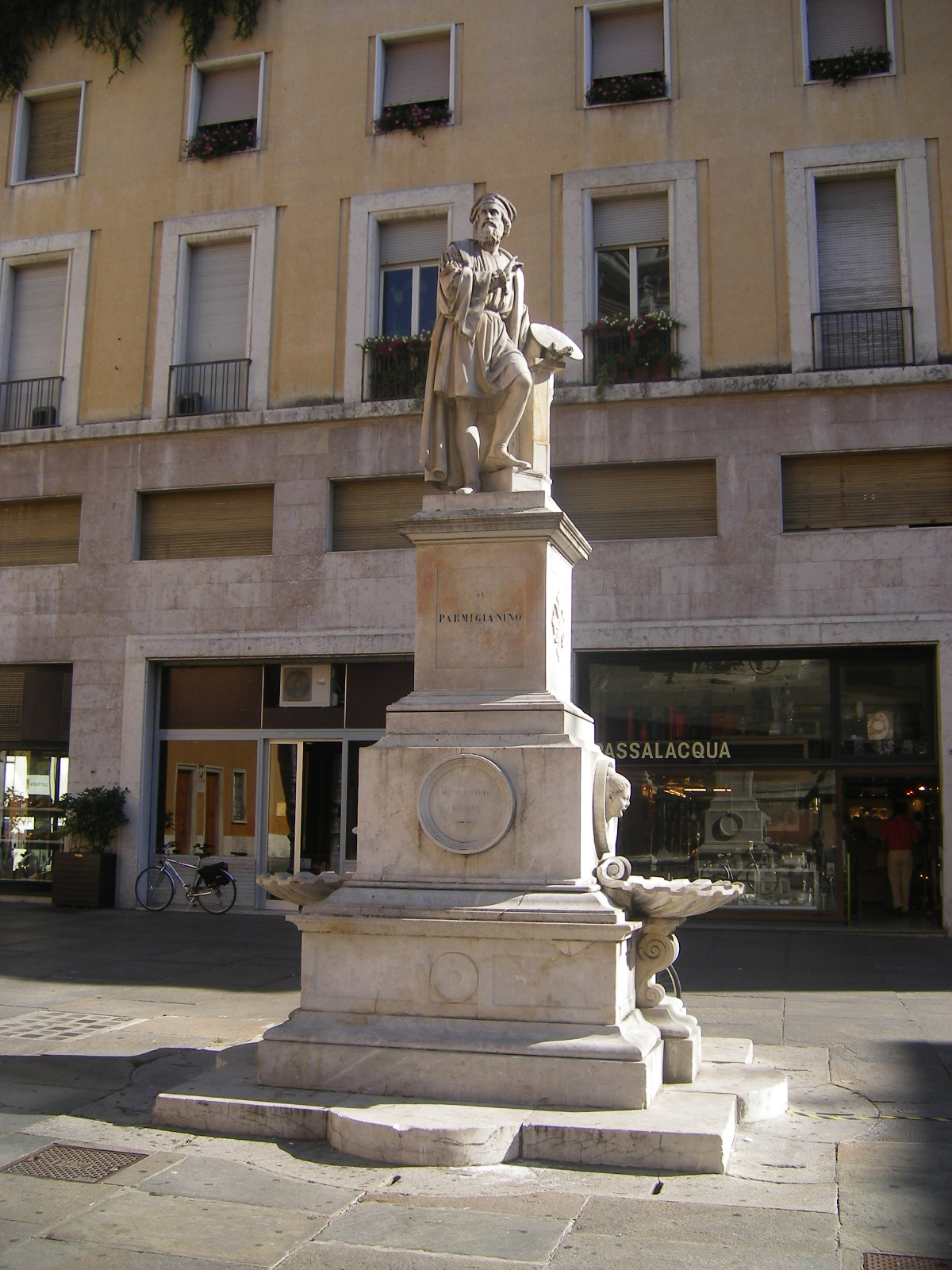
Statue of Parmigianino.

He was born in Bigarello in 1830. He became a professor at the Academy of Fine Arts of Parma. He completed the statue of Parmigianino located in the Piazzale della Steccata, outside of the church of Santa Maria della Steccata. In 1889, he recomposed the remnants of the Fountain of Trianon (Fontana del Trianon), now found in an island on the lake of the Palazzo Ducale di Colorno. He completed the monument to Cavaliere Albertelli for the church of Santa Maria del Quartiere.
