= Gaetano Chierici =

Italian painter (1838–1920)

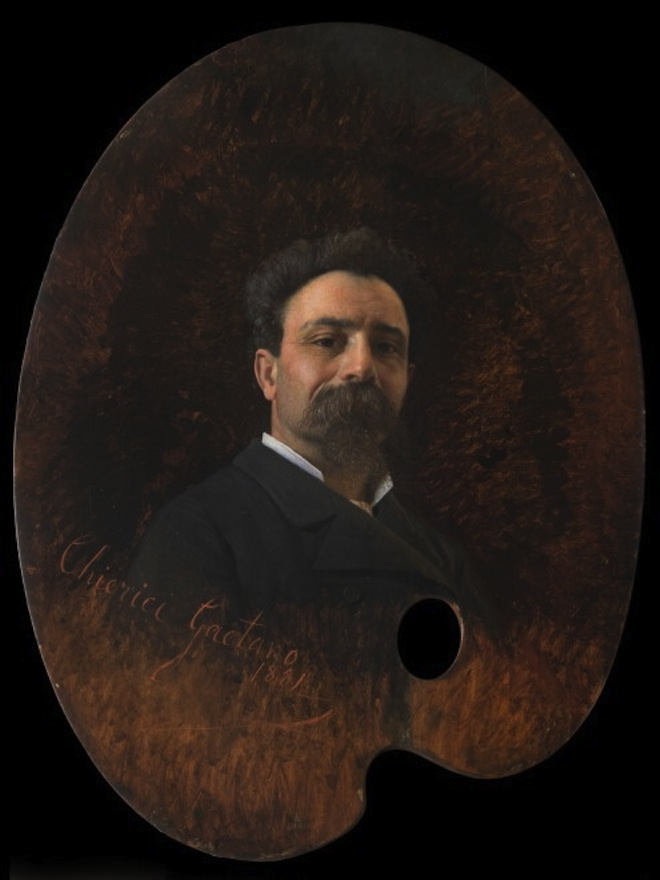
Self-portrait in the Uffizi Gallery, 1881

Gaetano Chierici (1838–1920) was an Italian painter, mainly of genre works.

== Biography ==
He was born in Reggio Emilia, and attended the Reggio Emilia School of Fine Arts in 1850 and 1851. Chierici continued his studies at the academies of Modena and Florence before completing his training in Bologna under the guidance of Giulio Cesare Ferrari. His early work was in Italy, influenced by the Neo-classicism of his uncle, the artist Alfonso Chierici, and of Adeodato Malatesta, but subsequently by the innovations of the Macchiaioli painters. It was in the late 1860s that he took up anecdotal genre painting with domestic interiors, which came to be his field of specialisation. While the artist's participation in the Fine Arts Expositions at the Brera Academy of 1869 marked the beginning of his success with critics and collectors, his work subsequently declined into mechanical repetition of the same subjects. He was the director of the Workers’ School of Drawing in Reggio Emilia from 1882 to 1907 and the city's first Socialist mayor from 1900 to 1902.

In the Alfred O. Deshong Collection at the Widener University Art Gallery, there are two Chierici genre works on display: Child Feeding Her Pets, 1872 and The Hasty Pudding, 1883.

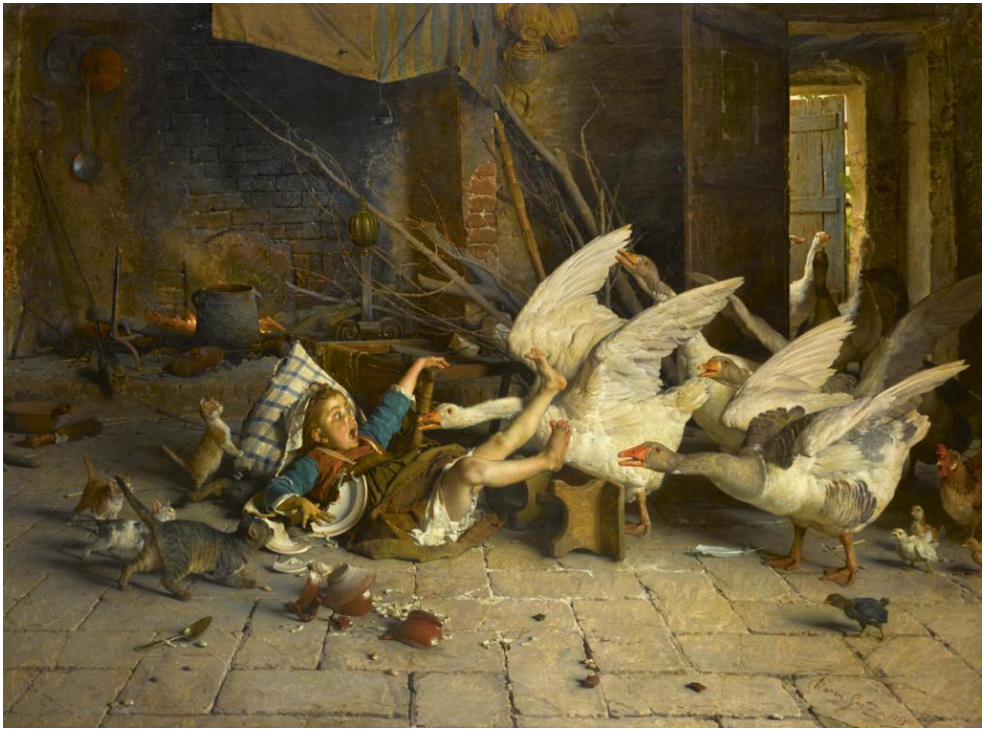
Surprised! (1888)

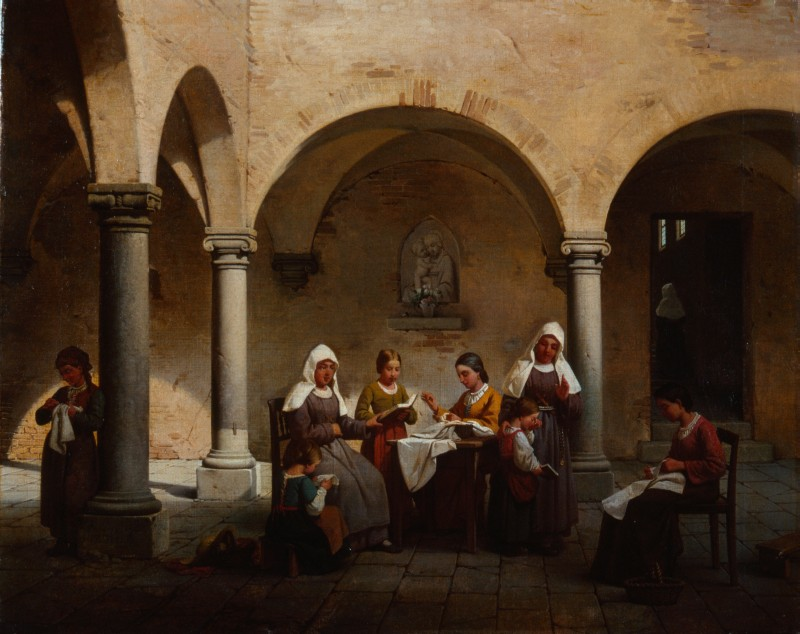
La lezione al convento, 1864 (Fondazione Cariplo)

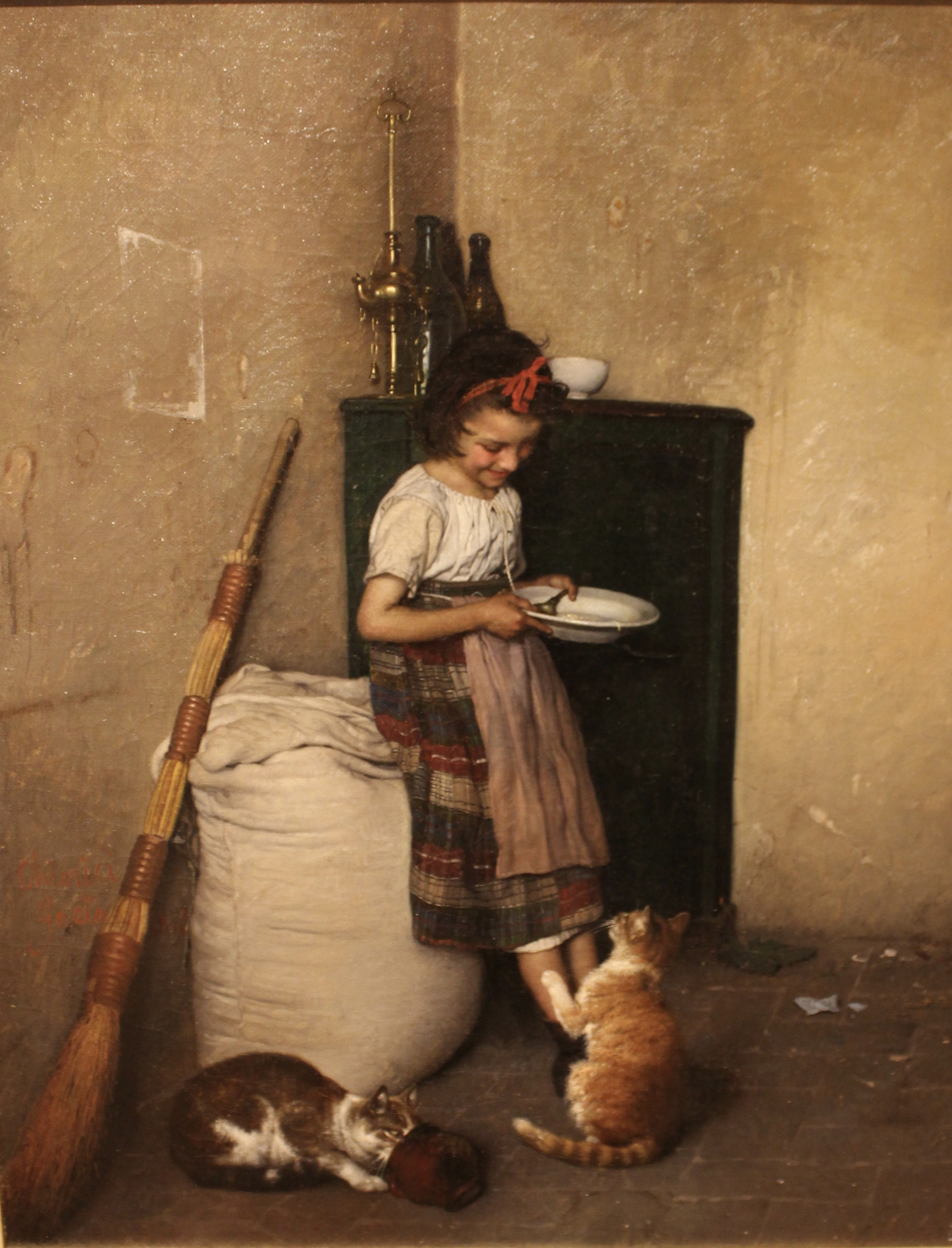
Child Feeding her Pets (1872)

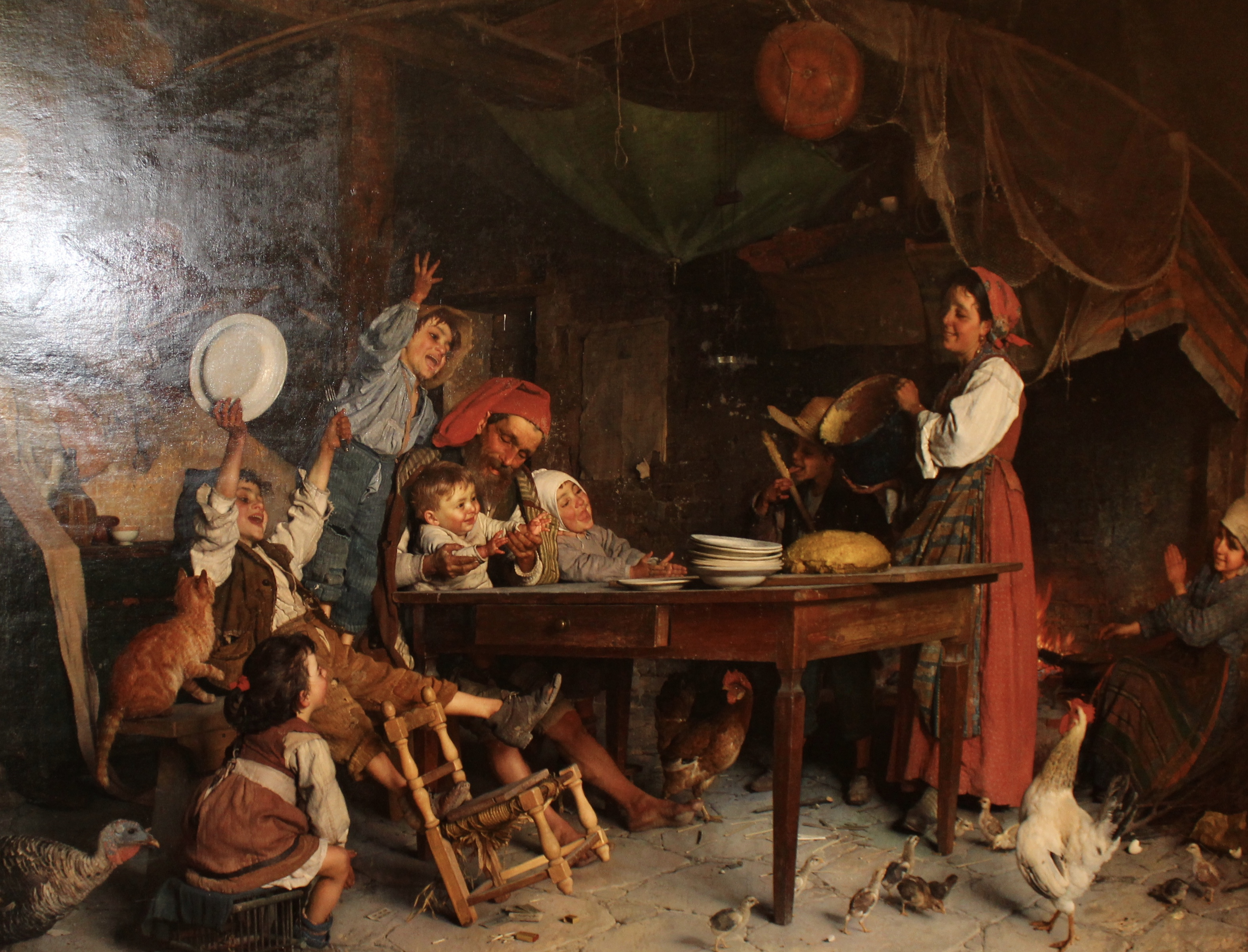
Hasty Pudding (1883)

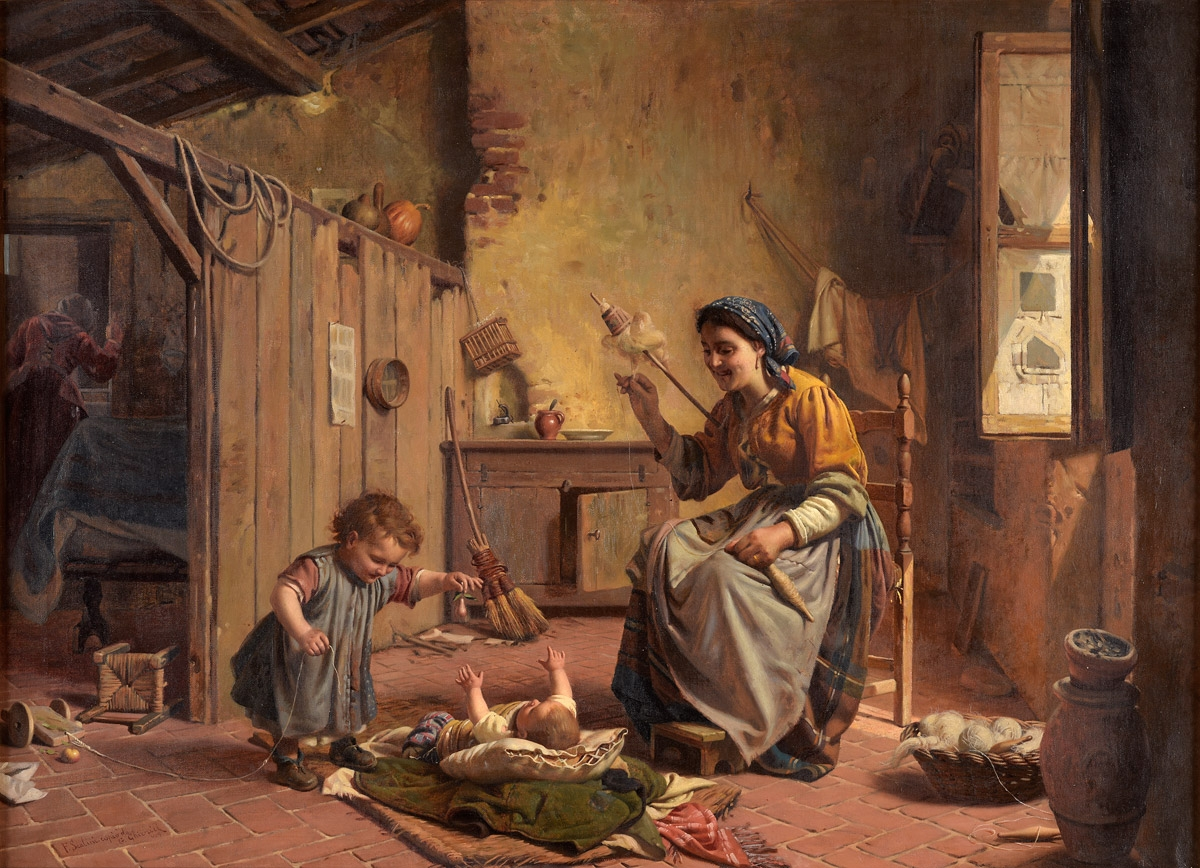
Young Mother's Happiness (1909)

== See also ==
- List of works by Gaetano Chierici

== Other projects ==
- Media related to Gaetano Chierici at Wikimedia Commons
