= Proto-Villanovan culture =

Late-Bronze Age culture in Italy

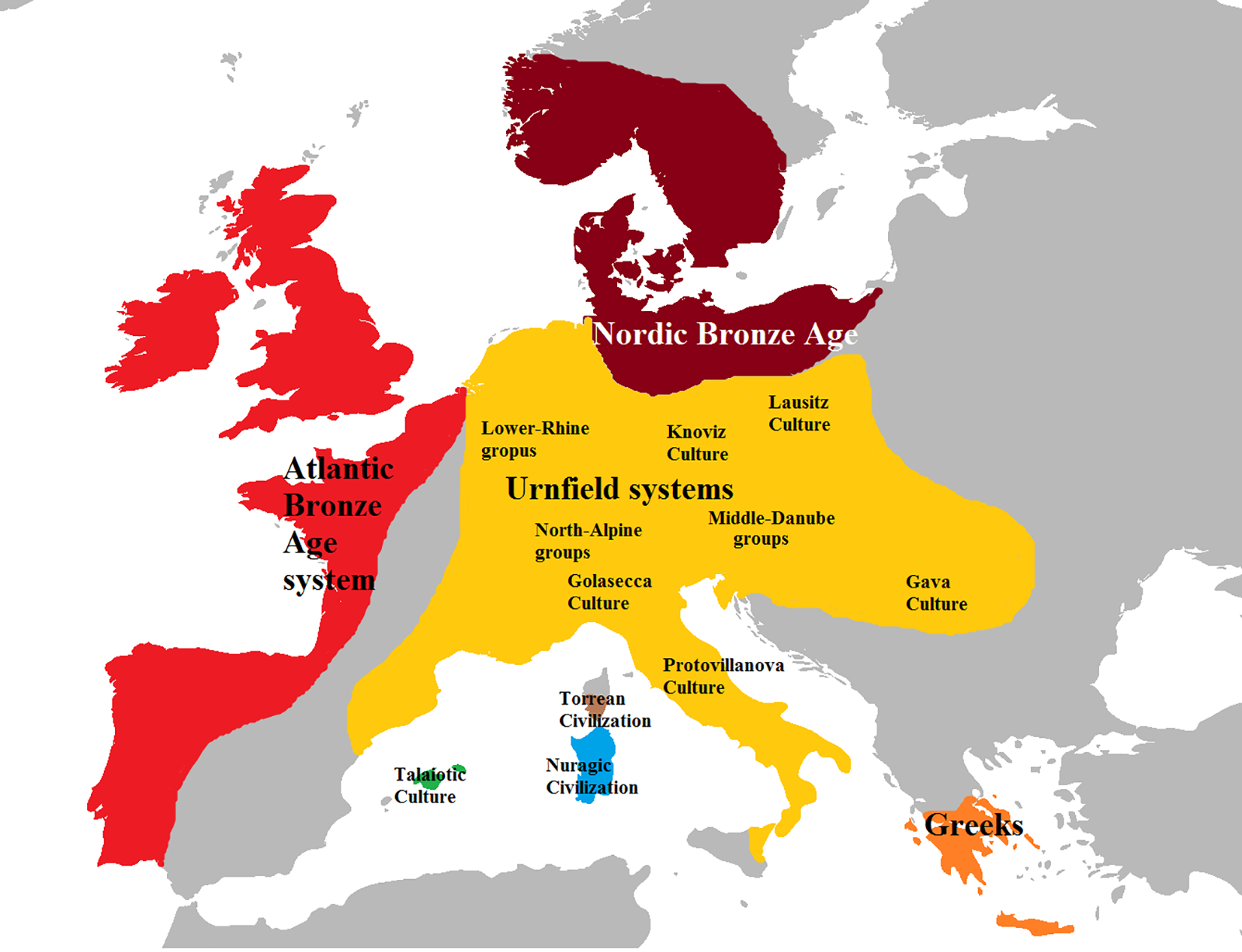
- Geographical range: Europe
- Period: Bronze Age
- Dates: c. 1175–960 BCE
- Preceded by: Urnfield culture, Terramare culture, Apennine culture
- Followed by: Villanovan culture, Latial culture, Este culture

The Proto-Villanovan culture (approximately 1175 BCE – 960 BCE) was a late Bronze Age culture that appeared in Italy, part of the central European Urnfield culture system of Central Europe (1300–750 BCE).

A supranational cultural facies, it spread across much of Italy, including eastern Sicily and the Aeolian Islands. It was characterized by the funerary ritual of cremation.

== History ==
=== Origins ===
The "Protovillanovan" culture (a term introduced by Giovanni Patroni in 1937) is included within the broader Urnfield culture network of Central Europe (German: Urnenfelder), and shows particular similarities with regional groups north of the Eastern Alps, specifically those of Bavaria–Upper Austria and the Middle Danube.

According to the American archaeologist Malcolm H. Wiener:

The Protovillanovan culture is linked to the Urnfield culture of Bavaria and Upper Austria [...]. Proto-Villanovan characteristics appear at Frattesina in Veneto alongside surviving elements of the earlier Terramare culture of the nearby Po Valley, and eventually spread in attenuated form throughout Italy and into eastern Sicily.

— Peter M. Fischer & Teresa Bürge (eds.), Sea Peoples' Up-to-Date: New Research on Transformation in the Eastern Mediterranean in the 13th–11th Centuries BCE, 2017, p. 54

According to Francesco di Gennaro, the Protovillanovan culture also shows northern affinities with the Lusatian culture and the Canegrate culture:

The decoration of the pottery shows northern affinities (Lusatia, Canegrate), and the Protovillanovan phenomenon displays some similarities with the transalpine Urnfield civilization.

== Distribution ==
As a result of the spread of the Protovillanovan culture, the Italian Peninsula experienced a significant degree of cultural unification, extending from the north to eastern Sicily. Settlements and burials of Protovillanovan type are numerous throughout the peninsula, especially in central-northern Italy—for example at Frattesina in Veneto, at Bismantova and Ripa Calbana in Emilia-Romagna, at Cetona, Sovana and Saturnia in Tuscany, in the Monti della Tolfa in Lazio, at Pianello di Genga and Ancona (Colle dei Cappuccini) in the Marche—while in the south important sites include Ortucchio in Abruzzo, Timmari near Matera (Basilicata), Torre Castelluccia, Canosa (Apulia), Tropea (Calabria) and Milazzo (Sicily). Based on certain shared characteristics, regional subgroups can be identified, such as the Chiusi–Cetona group, the Tolfa–Allumiere group, and the Rome–Colli Albani group.

== Settlements ==
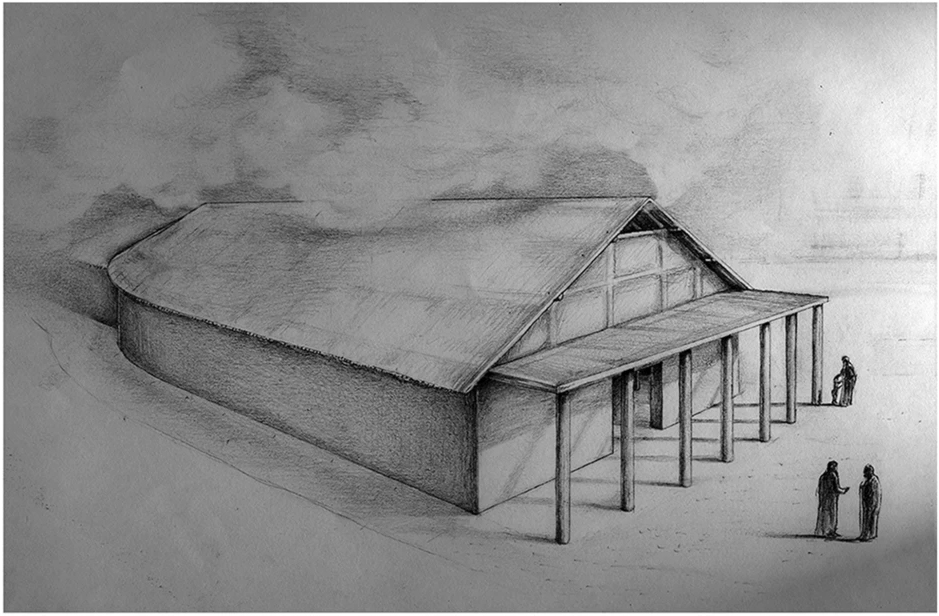
"Hut-temple" building at Roca Vecchia

Protovillanovan settlements were usually of small dimensions, built on well-defended heights (such as hills), and were often circumscribed by artificial fortifications. Some settlements housed relatively small communities (50–100 individuals); it has been estimated that in central Tyrrhenian Italy the average settlement area covered 40,000–50,000 square meters, with 300–500 inhabitants. Larger settlements (500–1,000 individuals) also existed, likely exercising a form of hegemony over smaller centers.

The proto-Villanovan culture was part of the central European Urnfield culture system. The similarity, in particular, has been noted with the regional groups of Bavaria-Upper Austria and of the middle-Danube. Furthermore, the Proto-Villanovan culture shows affinities with both the Lusatian and Canegrate cultures. Another hypothesis, however, is that it was a derivation from the previous Terramare culture of the Po Valley. The burial characteristics relate the Proto-Villanovan culture to the Central European Urnfield culture and Celtic Hallstatt culture that succeeded it. It is not possible to tell these apart in their earlier stages. Various authors, such as Marija Gimbutas, associated this culture with the arrival, or the spread, of the proto-Italics into the Italian Peninsula.

Proto-Villanovan sites are present all over the Italian peninsula, mostly in the northern-central part but also, to a lesser degree, in Southern Italy and eastern Sicily. Among the most important of these sites are: Frattesina (Veneto), Bismantova and Ripa Calbana (Emilia-Romagna), Cetona and Saturnia (Tuscany), Monti della Tolfa (Lazio), Pianello di Genga and Ancona (Marche), Ortucchio (Abruzzo), Timmari (Basilicata), Canosa (Apulia), Tropea (Calabria), and Milazzo (Sicily).

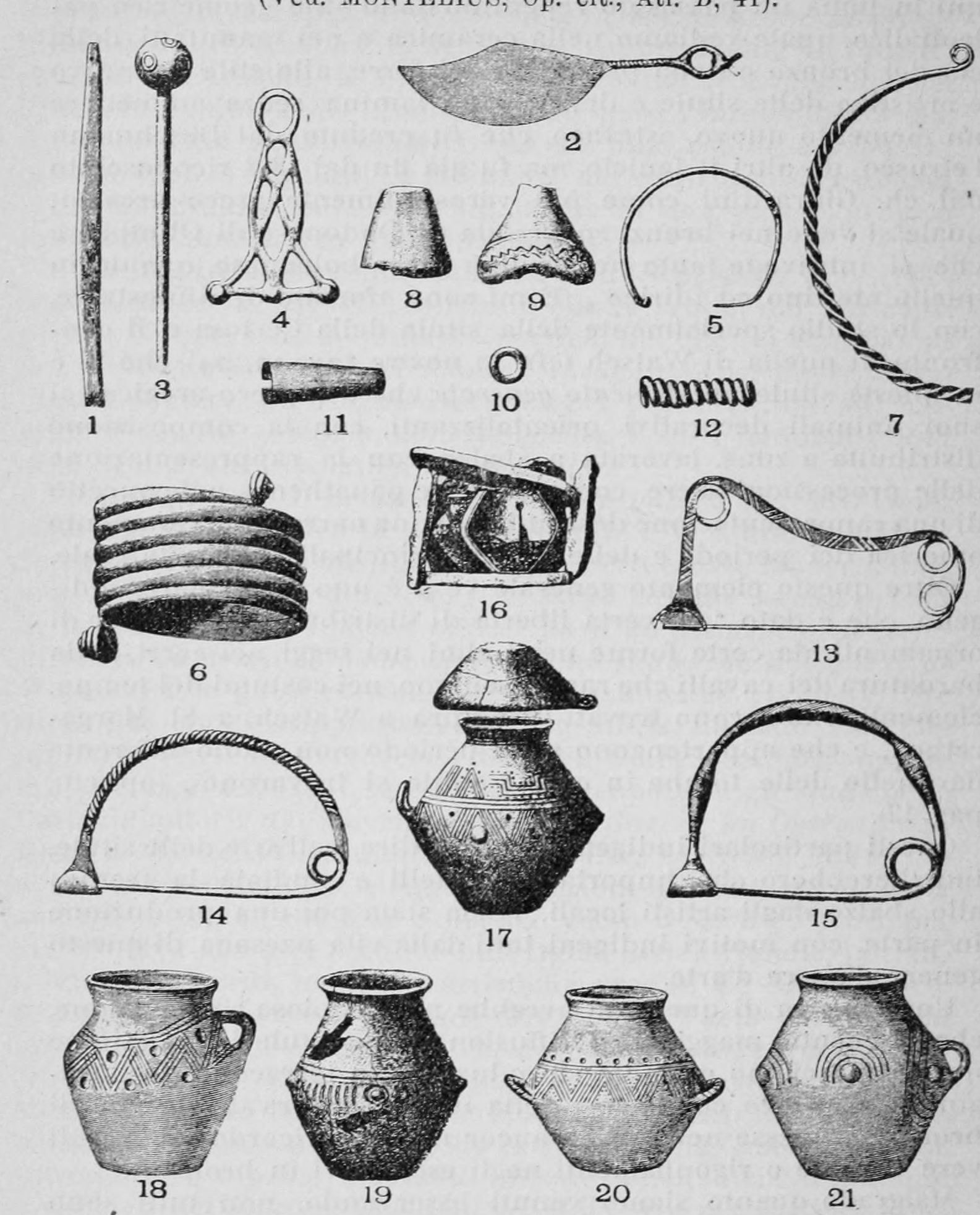
Proto-Villanovan artefacts: finds from the necropolis of Bismantova (RE)

== Society ==
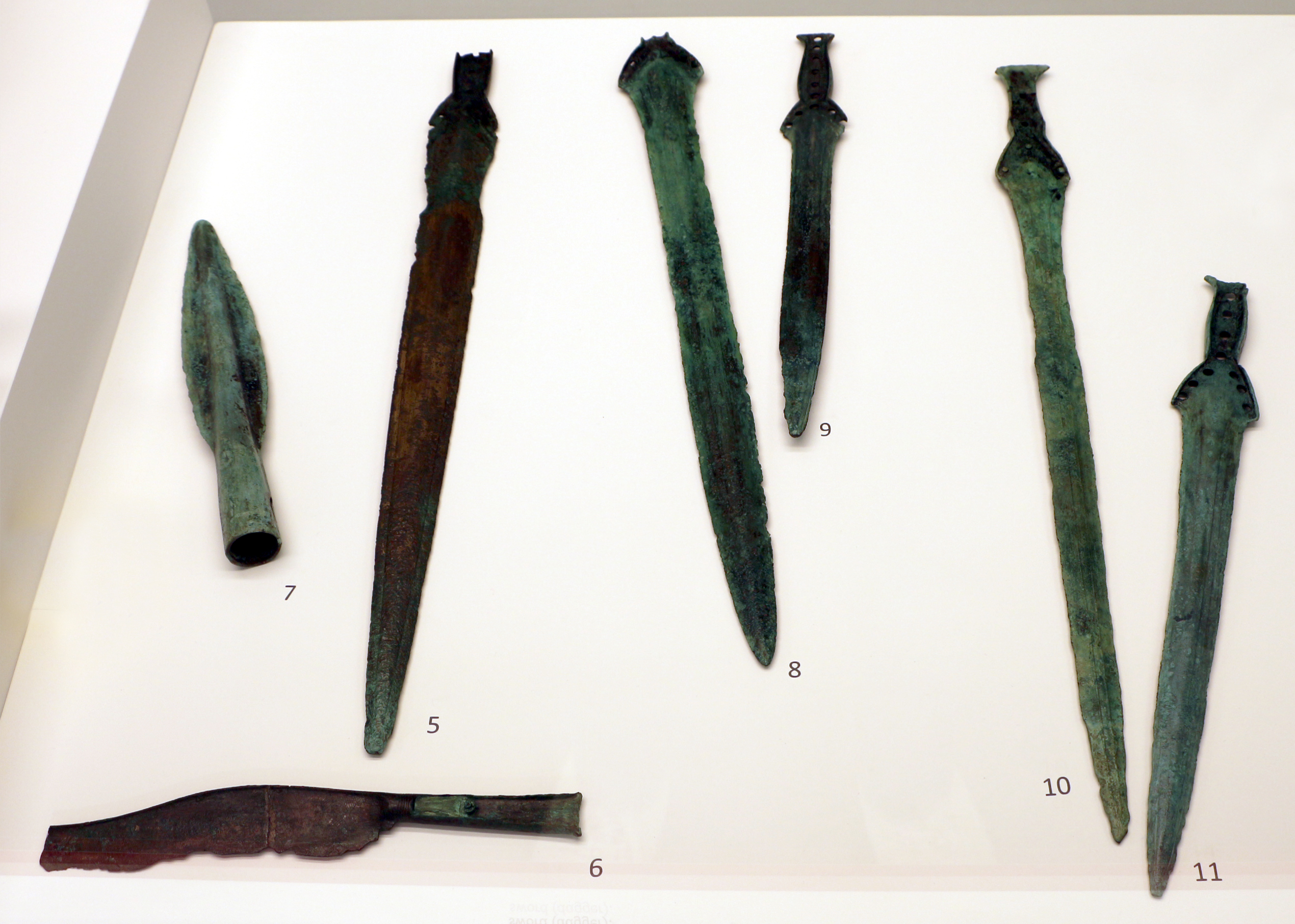
Swords, knives and spearheads from Castellace

=== Social stratification ===
The discovery of large buildings and of burials which—especially in certain areas (for example, the Monti della Tolfa)—are markedly differentiated in terms of the complexity of grave goods and the richness of materials, demonstrates that a certain degree of social stratification already existed within these communities. The figure of the specialized artisan assumed a particular role within these societies. This process of social differentiation occurred especially among the Protovillanovan communities of southern Etruria and Latium.

=== Socio-economic aspects ===
The Proto-Villanovan economy was based primarily on agriculture, animal husbandry, pastoralism, trades and activities connected with metallurgy.

==== Trade ====
During the Late Bronze Age, corresponding to the Protovillanovan cultural horizon, commercial exchanges within the peninsula intensified with nearby civilizations, conducted both by land and by sea. Protovillanovan Italy was part of an important “trade network” with the populations of the Aegean world, the Balkans, north of the Alps, and Nuragic Sardinia, among others.

=== Cult ===
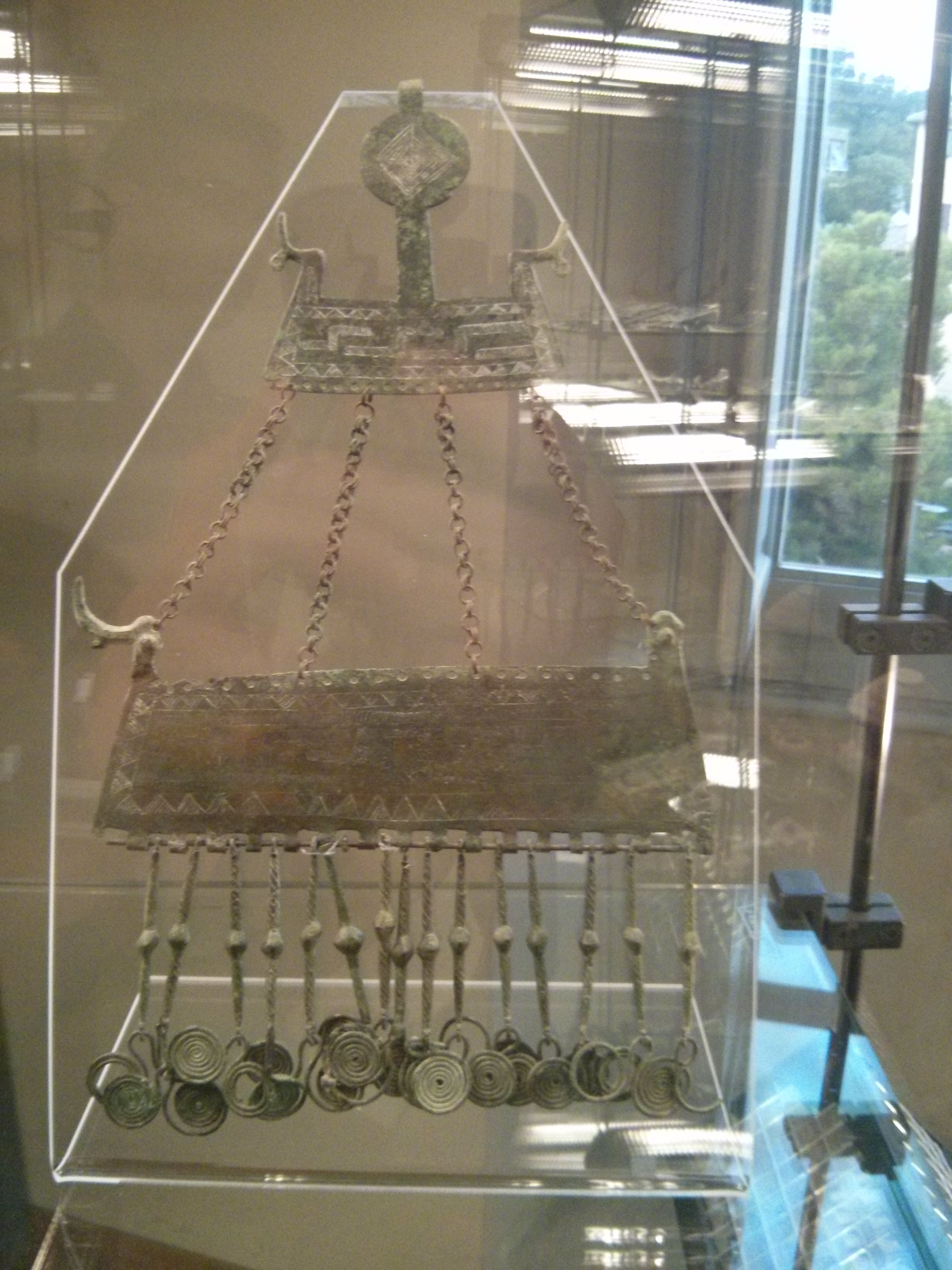
Representation of the solar boat with wild duck protomes at prow and stern on the upper part of a Picene bronze pectoral (National Archaeological Museum of the Marche)

Among the distinctive cult-related features of the Protovillanovan horizon, Di Gennaro notes:

The cremation rite shows an advanced transformation of religious practice from an earlier focus on chthonic deities (burials and offerings in caves) to the veneration of celestial entities (representations of the solar disk and bird-shaped deities, sometimes combined in compositions on ceramics, bronzes and even gold sheets).

==== Votive deposits ====
The discovery of various bronze hoards has led to the hypothesis that these objects were votive offerings to deities or grave goods intended for the afterlife. Very often these deposits or “hoards” were located in riverbeds or more generally in wet areas, perhaps indicating a cult centered on a water deity. In some cases, however, such deposits may represent simple accumulations of objects intended for melting down and recycling.

=== Funerary practices and burial rites ===
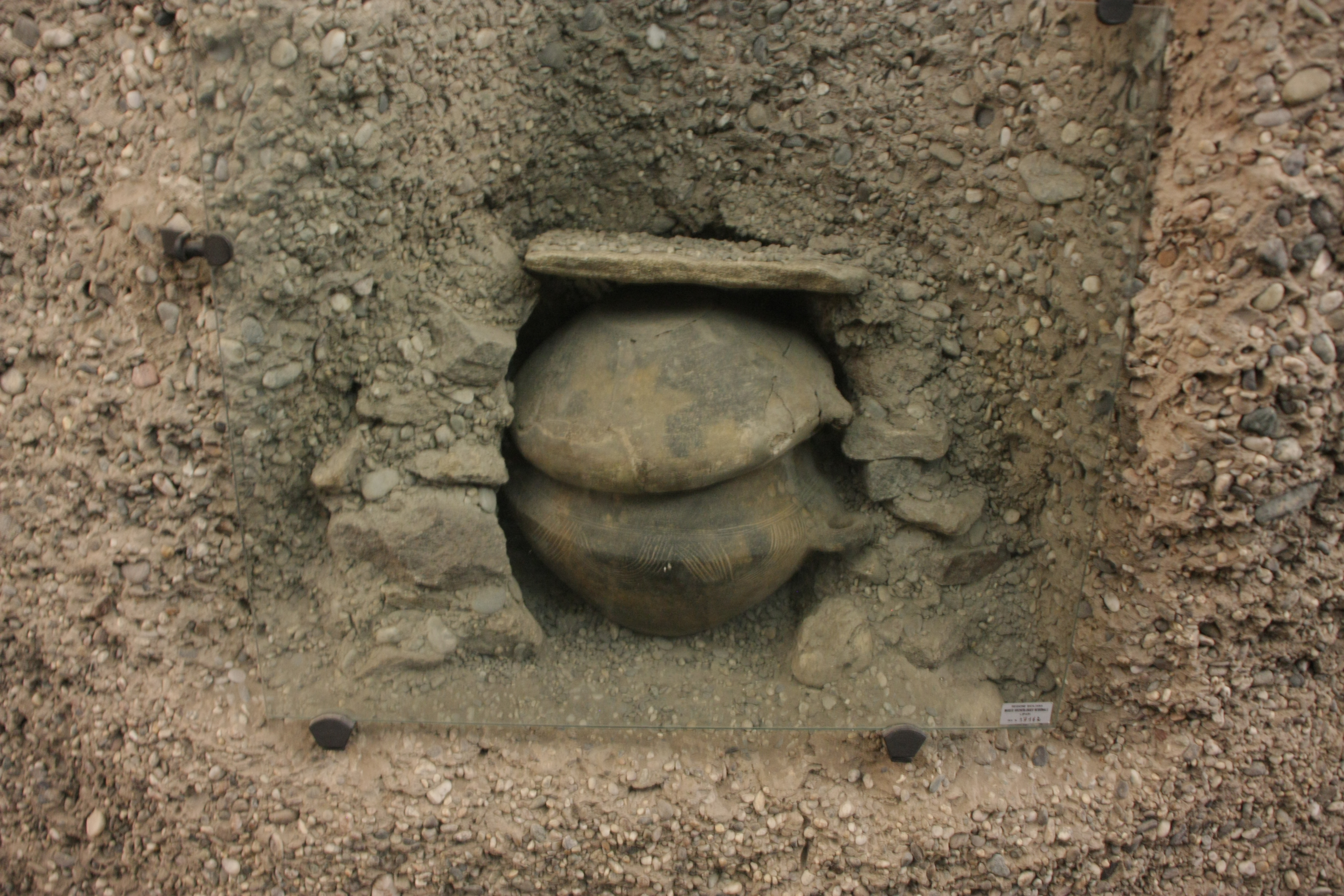
Cremation necropolis of Milazzo (ME)

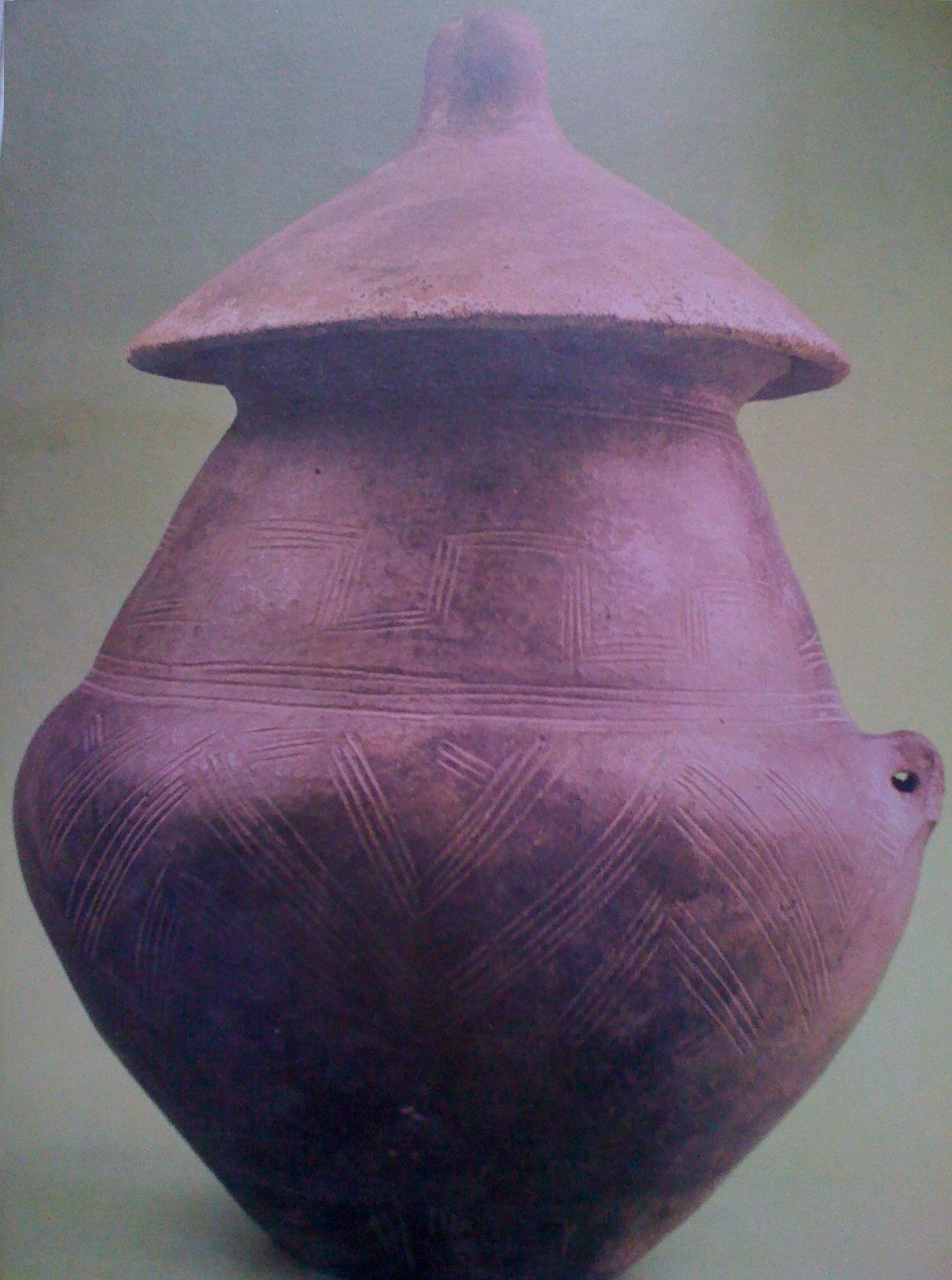
Proto-Villanovan cinerary urn from Allumiere

The Protovillanovan culture shares many traits with the Urnfield culture of Central Europe, particularly regarding funerary practices. The deceased were cremated, and their ashes were placed in Urnfield-style biconical (double-cone shaped) ceramic funerary urns, often decorated with geometric designs, and then buried directly in the ground, in pits, or in stone-lined cists. The decorative motifs were engraved in the clay before firing; only in southern regions painted decorations were also used. Elite graves containing jewelry, bronze armor, and horse harness fittings were separated from ordinary graves, showing for the first time the development of a highly hierarchical society, so characteristic of Indo-European cultures.

== Regionalization and development ==
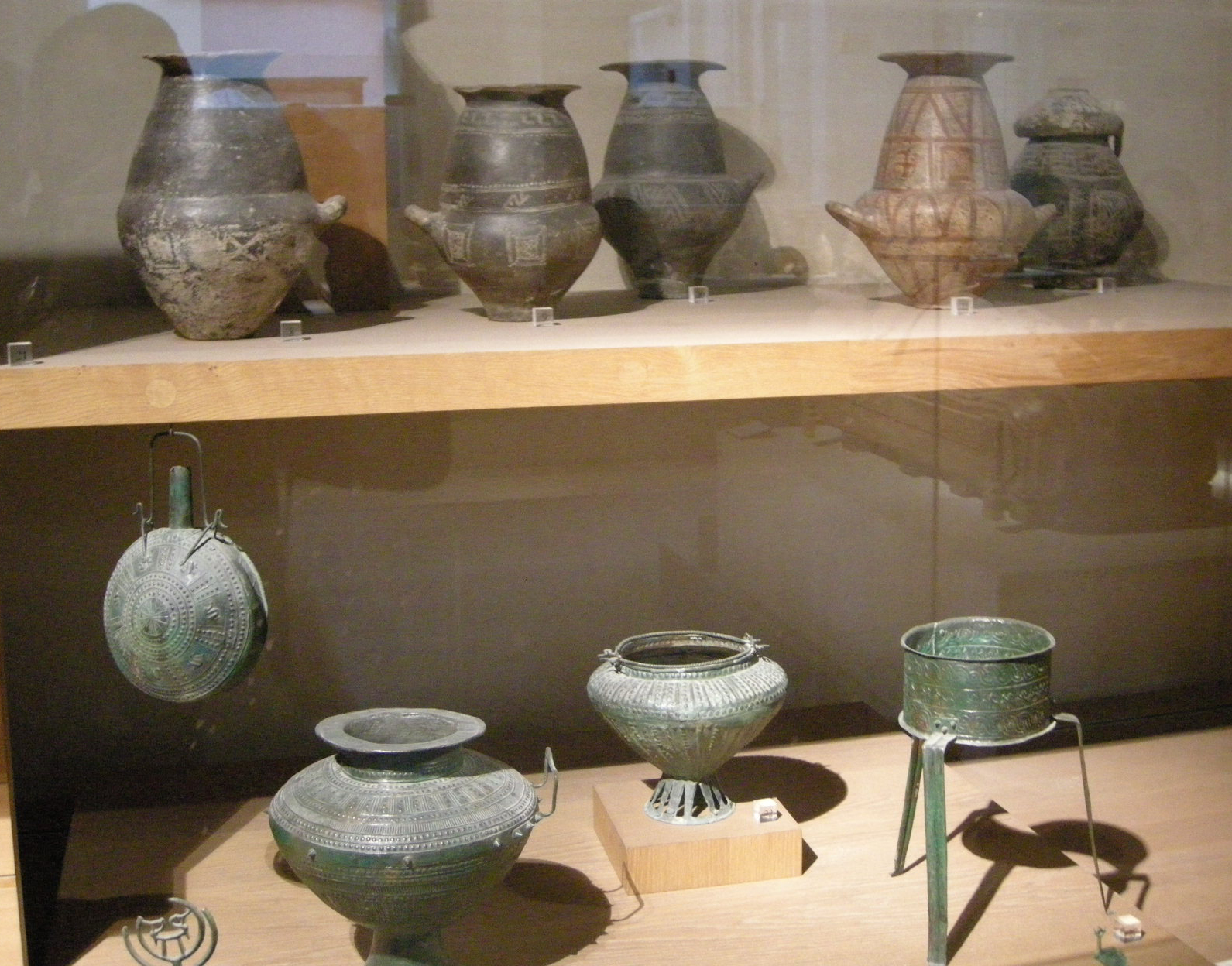
Villanovan artifacts

After a period of considerable uniformity from north to south, in the subsequent Iron Age the Proto-Villanovan culture shows a process of regionalization, leading to the emergence of several regional groups. Starting from c. 950 BC, new regional cultures such as the Villanovan culture, Este culture, and Latial culture appeared. Although these new cultures shared many similarities with the preceding Proto-Villanovan culture, especially funerary customs, they also exhibited their own innovations. In northern Italy the Golasecca culture appeared, associated with a population speaking the Lepontic language; in the Veneto region the Este culture developed, associated with the Paleo-Veneti; in central and northern Italy the Villanovan culture emerged, associated with the Etruscans; in central Italy the Latial culture developed, associated with the Proto-Latins; and the Terni culture, associated with the Proto-Umbri.

The most evident connecting element among the Protovillanovan, Golasecca, Atestine, Villanovan and Latial cultures is the cremation rite, which did not undergo significant ceremonial changes and was practiced for centuries by both Indo-European-speaking populations and pre-Indo-European-speaking groups such as the Etruscans. In the Terni culture, cremation remains documented mainly in the initial phase known as Terni I; however, inhumation was the characteristic funerary rite of populations of Umbrian ethnicity.

The Protovillanovan culture is also recognized as having played a role in the ethnogenesis of the Piceni and of other populations speaking Oscan-Umbrian languages.

== Genetics ==
A genetic study published in Science in November 2019 examined the remains of a female from the Proto-Villanovan culture buried in Martinsicuro, Italy, between ca. 930 BC and 839 BC, in the territory of the Picentes. She carried the maternal haplogroup U5a2b.

== Linguistic hypotheses ==
Although there is no certain proof—since no inscriptions dating to this period exist—it has been hypothesized that the spread of the Protovillanovan culture in Italy coincided with the arrival of Italic populations speaking the Italic languages, within the broader context of the Indo-European migrations of the second half of the Bronze Age.

David W. Anthony, arguing for a presumed Italo-Celtic linguistic unity, linked the arrival of the Italic peoples to the Protovillanovan culture, which, according to Anthony, derived in turn from the Urnfield cultures of the Bavarian plain or from Hungary. According to Kristian Kristensen, the Protovillanovan culture should instead be associated with the Velatice-Baierdorf group, between western Austria and southern Germany.

The identification of the Protovillanovan culture exclusively with the Italic linguistic family is, however, problematic, as already argued by Renato Peroni.

The Italic family itself is divided into two branches: Western Italic languages (Latino-Faliscan languages) and Eastern Italic languages (Osco-Umbrian languages). Cremation, a characteristic feature of the Protovillanovan culture, was widespread primarily among Latin-Faliscan-speaking populations (Oscan-Umbrian populations were predominantly inhuming), and not all linguists agree that these two branches formed in Italy.

The Protovillanovan culture is also associated with the Proto-Veneti, who in historical times spoke the Venetic language, an Indo-European language whose classification remains debated. Likewise, Proto-Etruscans emerged from the Protovillanovan culture around the 11th–10th century BCE, and from around 900 BCE the Villanovan culture developed as the earliest phase of the Etruscans, who spoke a pre-Indo-European language.

A similar situation applies to the Raeti, another linguistically pre-Indo-European population presumably related to the Etruscans. The Raetic territory, especially in the Tyrol region, was also affected by Urnfield cultural manifestations during the Early Iron Age.

Sometimes the Canegrate culture, followed by the Golasecca culture of the Iron Age, is also included within the material context of the Protovillanovan culture.

== Gallery ==
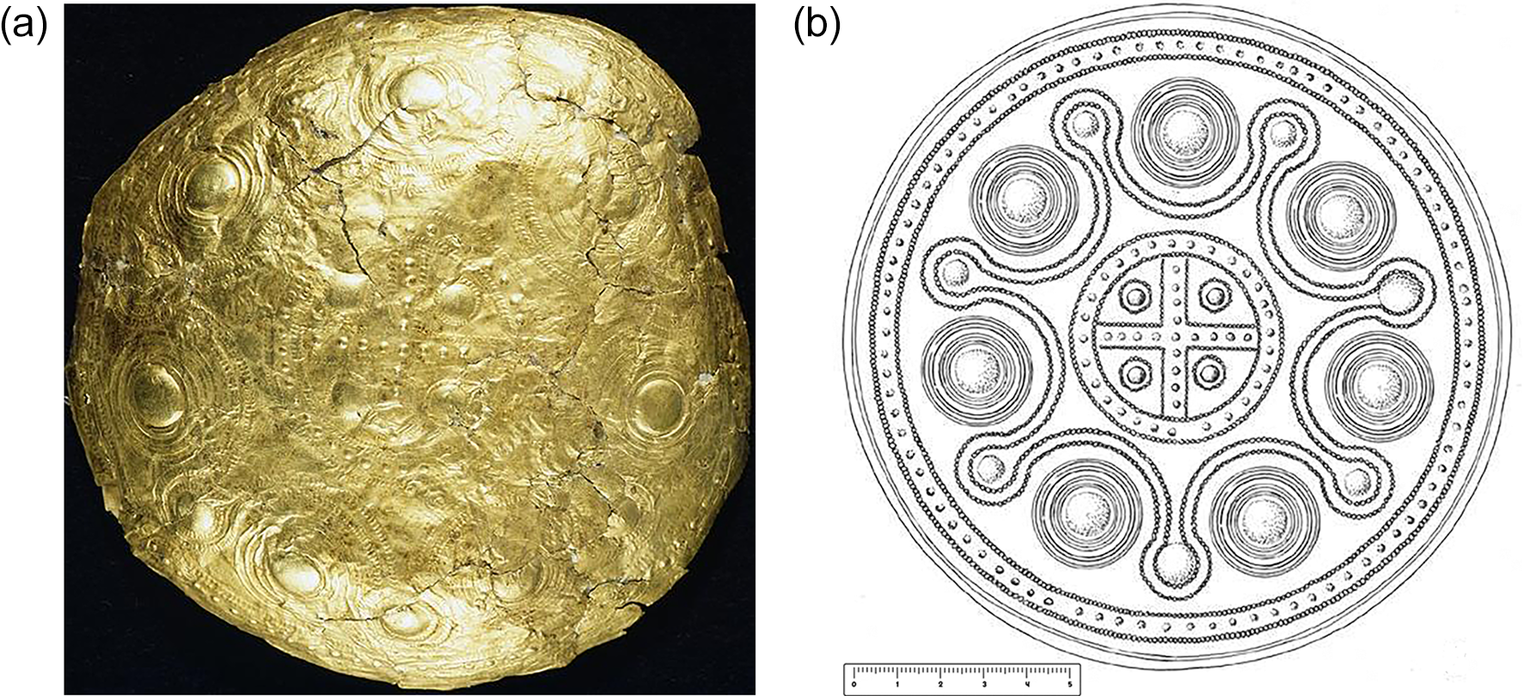
Gold disc from Gualdo Tadino, 12th-11th century BC

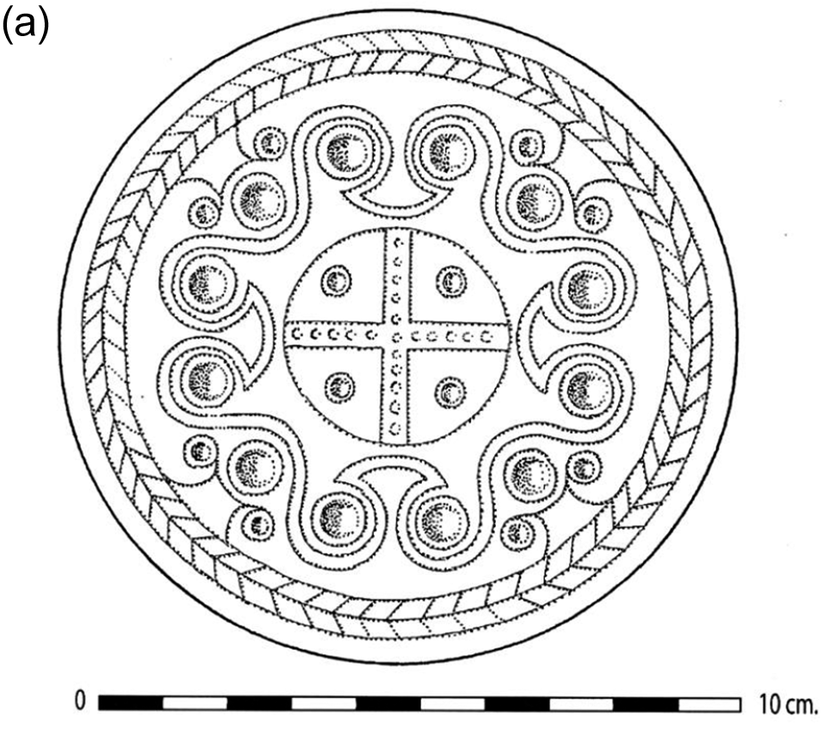
Gold disc from Roca Vecchia, 11th century BC

== Bibliography ==
- Le grandi avventure dell'archeologia. Vol. 5: Europa e Italia protostorica. Rome: Curcio Editore. 1980.
- Pallottino, Massimo (1984). Etruscologia. Milan: Hoepli. ISBN 978-88-203-1428-6.

== See also ==
- Protohistoric Italy
- Villanovan culture
- Latial culture
- Este culture
- Apennine culture
- Urnfield culture
- Terramare culture

== Sources ==
- Antonio, Margaret L.; et al. (November 8, 2019). "Ancient Rome: A genetic crossroads of Europe and the Mediterranean". Science. 366 (6466). American Association for the Advancement of Science: 708–714. Bibcode:2019Sci...366..708A. doi:10.1126/science.aay6826. PMC 7093155. PMID 31699931.
