= Unstrut culture =

- Geographical range: Central Germany
- Period: Middle–Late Bronze Age, early Iron Age
- Dates: c. 1300 BC – c. 750 BC
- Preceded by: Tumulus culture
- Followed by: Thuringian culture

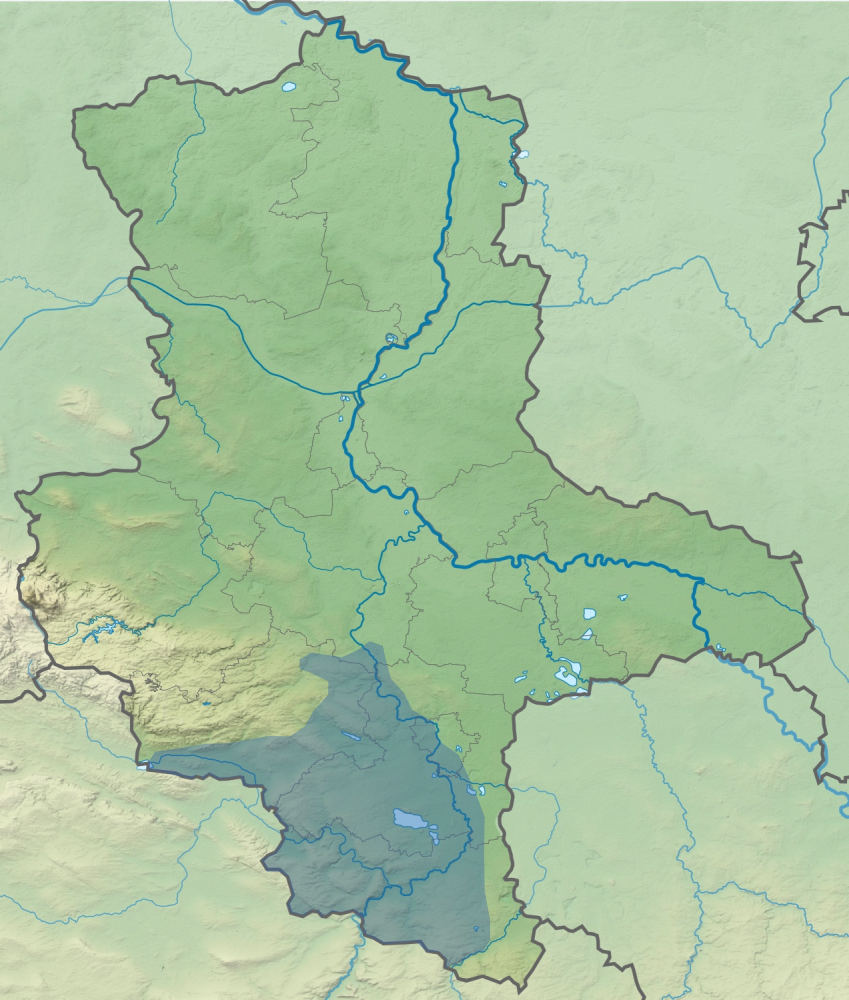
Distribution area of the Unstrut group in Saxony-Anhalt

The Unstrut culture (Unstrutgruppe) was part of the Bronze Age Urnfield culture, a homogeneous society noted for their biconical funerary urns used in storing the ashes of the deceased. The Unstrut (stone packing graves) group settled in Germany, particularly in the central region where the Saale mouth (stone cists) group also lived. These two groups, along with the Helmsdorf or Elb-Havel group formed on the western edge of the Lausitz culture.

== Genesis ==
The origins of the Unstrut culture are seen in the strong background of the tradition of the tumulus cultures. At the same time, its development was influenced by other groups: the South German Urnfield culture, the Knowiska culture and the Lusatian culture.

== Chronology and area of occurrence ==
The Unstruck culture (later called Thuringian) existed from the Bronze Age D to the Hallstatt Age D, according to the chronological division made by Paul Reinecke, i.e. in the years 1300–480/450 BC. Several phases can be distinguished in its development (according to K. Peschel):

- Arnstadt phase – bronze D and Hallstatt A1 (1300–1100 BC)
- Kunitz–Hallstatt A2 phase (1100–1050/1020 BC)
- Laasdorf phase (western part) and Gotha phase (eastern part) – Hallstatt B1 (1050/1020–950/920 BC)
- Heldrungen –Hallstatt phase B2-3 (950/920–800 BC)
- Thuringian culture/phase – Hallstatt C and D (800–480/450 BC)

The Unstrut culture covered the area of Thuringia, reaching north to the southern foothills of the Harz, and east to the middle Saale river basin.

== Settlement and economy ==
The people of the Unstrut culture settled in the most fertile areas of Thuringia, and from the end of the Bronze Age, when they forced out the Lusatian settlements from the upper Saale area, they also occupied the lands around the Saale river basin. They inhabited both open and defensive settlements, the latter often located on hills. The basic economic role was played by farming and animal breeding.

== Funeral rite ==
The skeletal rite prevailed among burials, but with a large number of cremation graves, with the latter appearing less and less frequently over time. In skeletal graves, the body of the deceased was placed on its back, in an upright position, with the head facing south, after which the grave was surrounded with stones and a cobblestone or stone mound was covered over it. Cremation burials were of the urn type. Both types of graves were equipped with ceramics and metal products.

== Cannibalism ==
Traces of cannibalism have been discovered in some settlements of the Unstrut culture, in the form of human bones treated by prehistoric people as animal bones. Such traces are known from a site in the city of Erfurt and from caves located near the town of Bad Frankenhausen, where the cult center of the people of the discussed culture was most likely located. This indicates the ritual role that cannibalism must have played there. More traces of cannibalism were discovered in the Knowiska culture, which existed at the same time.

== Inventory ==
For the pottery of the discussed culture, typical are vase-shaped vessels with a characteristically thickened upper part of the belly at the base of the neck, usually equipped with two handles. In addition, there are also multi-tiered vessels, known mainly from the Knowiska culture, and wide-mouthed vessels with a flared rim. In addition, there are also cups, ladles, bowls and biconical vessels resembling forms known from the Lusatian culture.

In the metal inventory from the older phases, we can find such products as: spiral shields with a hook-shaped bent end of the wire, armlets decorated with triangles, buckles with spiral shields, various types of shields made of sheet metal, bracelets, greaves and, among weapons and tools, swords of Western European origin, sickles and axes with a heel. For the later phases, on the other hand, typical are axes with wings, necklaces decorated with diagonal grooves, massive bronze bracelets in the shape of a stirrup and large, massive bronze pins with a profiled head.

== Vanishing ==
During the Thuringian culture, the unit in question was subject to influence from the West Hallstatt culture. The development of the Unstrut-Thuringian culture was put to an end by the Celtic peoples, who arrived in Thuringia only at the end of the Hallstatt period.
