= Oricola =

- Comune
- Comune di Oricola
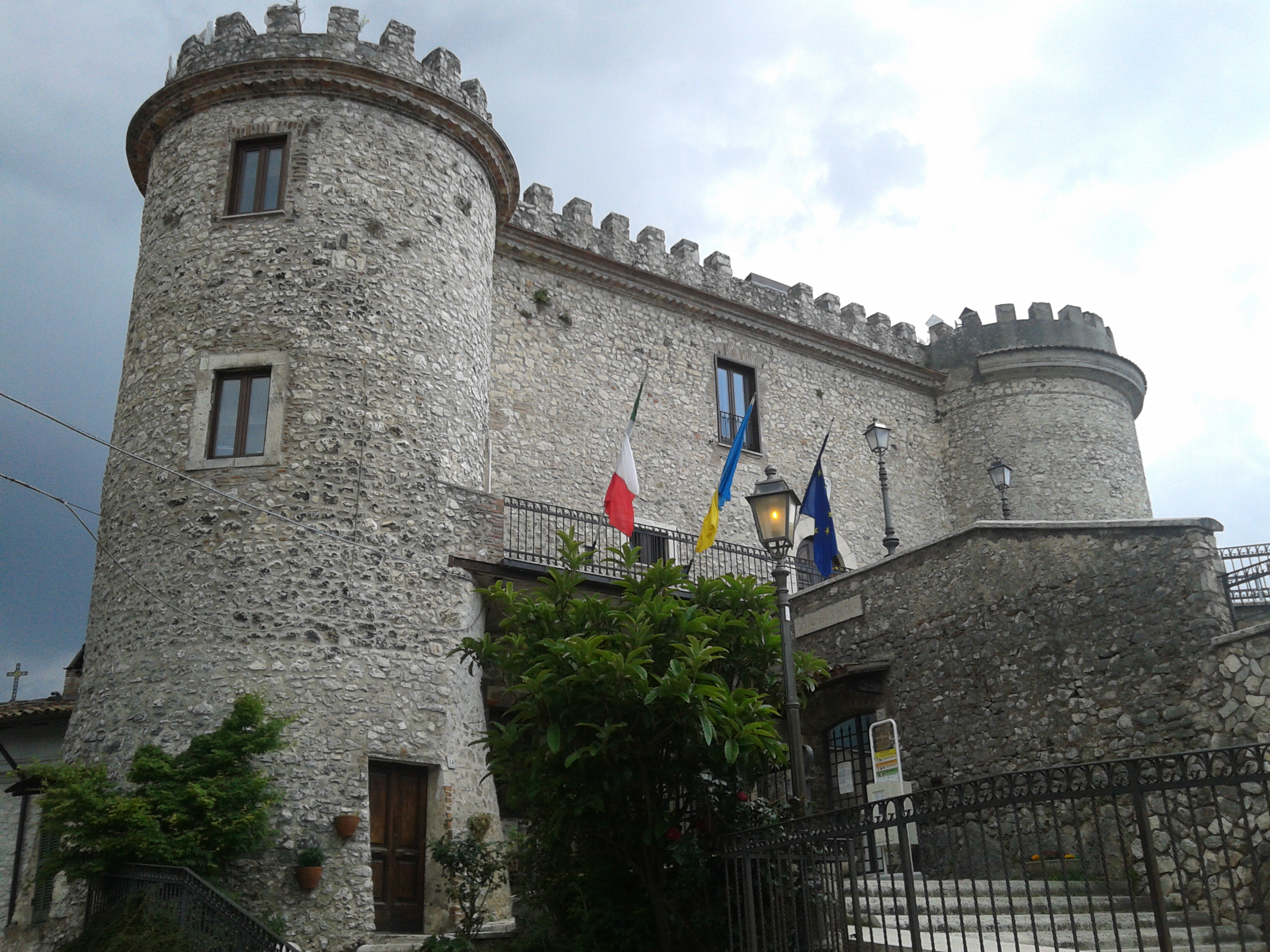

- Coat of arms

- Location within Italy Location within Abruzzo
- Coordinates: 42°3′1″N 13°2′25″E
- Country: Italy
- Region: Abruzzo
- Province: L'Aquila (AQ)
- Frazioni: Civita

Government
  - Mayor: Antonio Paraninfi

Area
  - Total: 18.40 km^{2} (7.10 sq mi)
- Elevation: 810 m (2,660 ft)

Population (31 July 2010)
  - Total: 1,154
  - Density: 62.72/km^{2} (162.4/sq mi)
- Demonym: Oricolani
- Time zone: UTC+1 (CET)
  - Summer (DST): UTC+2 (CEST)
- Postal code: 67063
- Dialing code: 0863
- Saint day: 17 May and 15 August
- Website: Official website

Oricola (Marsicano: Urìcula) is a comune and town in the province of L'Aquila, Abruzzo, central Italy, located near the regional boundary with Latium. It is commanded by a mid-15th century rocca (fortress) and, in its communal territory, is home to the remains of several ancient Italic settlements. The church of Santa Restituta contains a 13th-century fresco.
