= Italic peoples =

Ethnolinguistic group

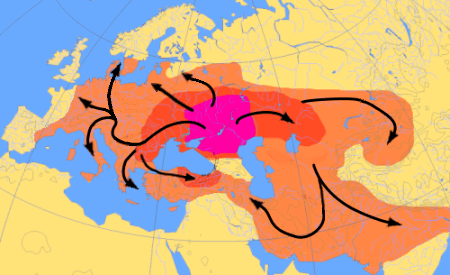
The mainstream scenario, known as the Kurgan hypothesis, for the migration of the Indo-European (IE) peoples in the period 4000–1000 BC.

The concept of Italic peoples is widely used in linguistics and historiography of ancient Italy. In a strict sense, commonly used in linguistics, it refers to the Osco-Umbrians and Latino-Faliscans, speakers of the Italic languages, a subgroup of the Indo-European language family. In a broader sense, commonly used in historiography, all the ancient peoples of Italy are referred to as Italic peoples, including the non-Indo-European ones, such as Rhaetians and Etruscans.

The Italic peoples emerged from the Urnfield and Tumulus groups, who spread across Italy during the late Bronze Age and early Iron Age. Their distinctive material culture, known as the proto-Villanovan culture, appeared in parts of the Italian peninsula in the first half of the 12th century BC. As the Latins achieved a dominant position among these groups, by virtue of the expansion of the Roman civilization, the other Italic peoples adopted the Latin language and culture as part of the process of Romanization.

== Classification ==
A reworked map of Italic tribes, including cities and towns, and accounting for Italic conquests of Greek and Etruscan lands.

The Italics were an ethnolinguistic group who are identified by their use of the Italic languages, which form one of the branches of Indo-European languages. Archaeologists and linguists generally associate the first peoples clearly identifiable as proto-Italic with the Bell Beaker and Urnfield groups, who during the Bronze Age migrated from the north and east of the Alps to the Italian peninsula in multiple waves.

Italic-speaking peoples inhabited much of central and southern Italy in the first millennium BC. Their languages are traditionally divided into Latin-Faliscan and Sabellic (often called Osco-Umbrian) groups. The Latins and Falisci were associated with Latium and neighboring areas, while Oscan- and Umbrian-speaking populations occupied extensive parts of central and southern Italy. Ancient sources also mention peoples such as the Oenotrians, Italii, Ausones, Aurunci and Opici in southern Italy, although their precise linguistic affiliations are uncertain. The Veneti of northeastern Italy spoke Venetic, an Indo-European language whose classification within the Italic branch has been debated. The Sicels of eastern Sicily spoke another poorly attested Indo-European language with possible Italic affinities.

Outside of the specialised linguistic literature, the term is also used to describe the ancient peoples of Italy as defined in Roman times, including pre-Roman peoples such as the Etruscans and the Rhaetians, who did not speak Indo-European languages. Such use is improper in linguistics, but employed by sources such as the Encyclopædia Britannica.

== History ==
=== Copper Age ===
Distribution of archaeological cultures in Europe and Caucasus before 3000 BC.

During the Copper Age, at the same time that metalworking appeared, Indo-European speaking peoples are believed to have migrated to Italy in several waves. Associated with this migration are the Remedello culture and Rinaldone culture in Northern and Central Italy, and the Gaudo culture of Southern Italy. These cultures were led by a warrior-aristocracy and are considered intrusive. Their Indo-European character is suggested by the presence of weapons in burials, the appearance of the horse in Italy at this time, and material similarities with cultures of Central Europe.

According to David W. Anthony, a massive migration of Proto-Indo-Europeans, belonging to the Yamnaya culture, took place toward the Danube Valley between 3100 and 3000 BC. Thousands of kurgans, or burial mounds, are attributed to this event. These migrations likely led to the separation of the Pre-Italic, Pre-Celtic, and Pre-Germanic groups from the Proto-Indo-European population. By this time the Anatolian peoples and the Tocharians had already split off from other Indo-Europeans.

The origin of a hypothetical ancestral Italo-Celtic people is to be found in today's eastern Hungary, settled around 3100 BC by the Yamnaya culture. This hypothesis is to some extent supported by the observation that Italic shares a large number of isoglosses and lexical terms with Celtic and Germanic, some of which are more likely to be attributed to the Bronze Age. In particular, using Bayesian phylogenetic methods, Russell Gray and Quentin Atkinson argued that Proto-Italic speakers separated from Proto-Germanics 5500 years before present, i.e. roughly at the start of the Bronze Age. This is further confirmed by the fact that the Germanic language family shares more vocabulary with the Italic family than with the Celtic language family.

=== Early and Middle Bronze Age ===
Distribution of archaeological cultures in Europe and Caucasus after 3000 BC.

From the late third to the early second millennium BC, tribes coming both from the north and from Franco-Iberia brought the Beaker culture and the use of bronze smithing to the Po Valley, to Tuscany and to the coasts of Sardinia and Sicily. The Beaker culture may have served as the link through which Yamnaya-related dialects spread from Hungary into Austria and Bavaria, where they could have subsequently developed into Proto-Celtic, while Proto-Italic may have emerged among the early early Indo-European dialects that remained in Hungary.

The arrival of Indo-European-speaking populations in Italy has sometimes been associated with the expansion of the Bell Beaker culture and subsequent migrations from Central Europe. Around 1800 BC, an influx of early Indo-European groups across the Alps from East-Central Europe is thought to have taken place. Between the Early Bronze Age and the transitional phase toward the Middle Bronze Age, evidence emerges of a connection with Central Europe, as attested by the spread of triangular daggers throughout Italy, often found in hoards. During this period, the Gáta–Wieselburg culture expanded from present-day eastern Austria, western Hungary, and southwestern Slovakia into northeastern Italy. According to Barfield, the emergence of the Polada culture was likewise connected to the arrival of new populations from southern Germany and Switzerland.

Drawing on earlier scholarship, including the work of Wolfgang Helbig, Luigi Pigorini proposed that the Italic peoples entered the Italian peninsula from the north-Alpine region, initially establishing lake-dwelling settlements associated with the Polada culture. Bernard Sergent, meanwhile, traced the origins of the Ligurian linguistic family, which he considered distantly related to the Italic and Celtic languages, to the Rhône and Polada cultures, both of which were strongly connected to the Central European Unetice tradition.

More recently, Raffaele de Marinis has proposed that a Proto-Celtic presence in northern Italy may date back to the beginning of the Middle Bronze Age (16th–15th centuries BC). During this period, northwestern Italy maintained close cultural and technological connections with the western groups of the Tumulus culture (c. 1600–1200 BC), particularly in the production of bronze objects and ornaments.

From approximately 1600 BCE onwards, increasingly extensive contacts between the Pannonian Plain and the Po Valley contributed to the emergence of the Terramare culture in the mid-second millennium BCE. The abandonment of many fortified tell settlements in the Great Hungarian Plain and elsewhere in the Carpathian Basin around 1500–1450 BC marked the transition from the Middle to the Late Bronze Age. This process coincided with the expansion of Tumulus-related groups and material traditions from Central Europe into much of the Carpathian Basin. These developments may have facilitated the westward movement of populations and the transmission of cultural practices between Central Europe, the Danube region and the Po Valley. By approximately 1450 BCE, the people of the Terramare culture had gradually adopted cremation as their primary funerary practice, placing the ashes of the deceased in urns that were subsequently buried in cemeteries known as urnfields. The earliest evidence for urnfield cemeteries dates to around 2000 BCE in central Hungary, where the practice emerged among tell communities associated with the Late Nagyrév and Vatya cultures before spreading into neighbouring regions following the decline of the tell system around 1500 BCE, eventually becoming particularly widespread in the southern Po Valley.

The emergence of large cremation cemeteries within the Terramare culture was one of the main foundations of archaeologist Luigi Pigorini's theory of the Italici incineratori (Italic cremators). The Latino-Faliscan populations have been particularly associated with this culture.

=== Late Bronze Age ===
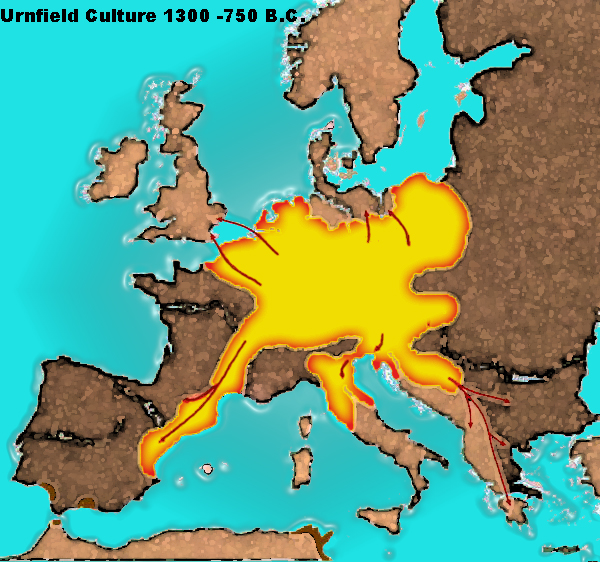
Urnfield-related migrations

The crisis and subsequent depopulation of the Hungarian Plain, during the wider European upheavals around 1250–1150 BC, may have triggered further demographic movements toward the Italian peninsula by Proto-Italic-speaking populations, possibly belonging to an Italo-Celtic linguistic and cultural stock that still resided in that region at the time. Their migration westward could have placed additional pressure on the already ecologically strained Terramare society, thereby contributing to its collapse around 1150 BC, perhaps within the relatively short span of just a few decades. This collapse was accompanied by a dramatic reduction in the number of settlements and the abandonment of their homes by more than 100,000 people. It also initiated the widespread dispersal of Terramare populations throughout the Italian Peninsula, with substantial groups relocating to other regions. Some of these displaced populations may even have eventually become associated with the Sea Peoples. These developments unfolded against the backdrop of widespread political, demographic, and cultural upheaval throughout the Mediterranean, culminating in the broader crisis conventionally known as the Late Bronze Age Collapse.

By the final phase of the Bronze Age, various Italic-speaking groups had likely arrived on the Italian peninsula, gradually differentiating into distinct linguistic and tribal communities and spreading throughout central and southern Italy. Some communities subsequently crossed the Apennines and contributed to the formation of new settlements and cultural groups in central Italy, including Latium. This period also witnessed the southward diffusion of the cremation burial practices and the widespread use of the domestic horse across the peninsula, broadly coinciding with the dispersal of Terramare populations and the emergence of the Urnfield cultural horizon, represented in Italy by the tradition known as Proto-Villanovan (c. 1200–1000 BC). The distribution of pottery exhibiting Terramare cultural characteristics in northern Tuscany, Romagna, Umbria, and the Marche suggests that these territories received significant influxes of migrants originating in the Po Valley. Further evidence of this population dispersal may be found in Campania, where elements of Terramare ceramic traditions have likewise been identified at several archaeological sites.

The Proto-Villanovan culture dominated the peninsula and replaced the preceding Apennine culture. The Proto-Villanovans practiced cremation and buried the ashes of their dead in Urnfield-style biconical shaped funerary urns, often decorated with geometric designs. Elite graves containing jewellery, bronze armour and horse harness fittings were separated from ordinary graves, showing for the first time the development of a highly hierarchical society, so characteristic of Indo-European cultures. The burial characteristics relate the Proto-Villanovan culture to the Central European Urnfield culture and Celtic Hallstatt culture that succeeded it. It is not possible to tell these apart in their earlier stages. Generally speaking, Proto-Villanovan settlements have been found in almost the whole Italian peninsula from Veneto to eastern Sicily, although they were most numerous in the northern-central part of Italy. The most important settlements excavated are those of Frattesina in Veneto region, Bismantova in Emilia-Romagna and near the Monti della Tolfa, north of Rome. Various authors, such as Marija Gimbutas, associated this culture with the arrival, or the spread, of the proto-Italics into the Italian Peninsula.

Diffusion of the Canegrate culture

In the 13th century BC, Proto-Celts (probably the ancestors of the Lepontii people), coming from the area of modern-day Switzerland, eastern France and south-western Germany (RSFO Urnfield group), entered Northern Italy (Lombardy, eastern Piedmont and Ticino), starting the Canegrate culture, who not long time after, merging with the indigenous Ligurians, produced the mixed Golasecca culture. Canegrate had a cultural dynamic, as expressed in its pottery and bronzework, that was completely new to the area and was a typical example of the western Hallstatt culture. The name comes from the locality of Canegrate in Lombardy, south of Legnano and 25 km north of Milan, where Guido Sutermeister discovered important archaeological finds (approximately 50 tombs with ceramics and metallic objects). It is one of the richer archeological sites of Northern Italy.

=== Iron Age ===
Ethnic groups of Italy (as defined by today's borders) in 400 BC

In the early Iron Age, the relatively homogeneous Proto-Villanovan culture (1200-900 BC), closely associated with the Celtic Hallstatt culture of Alpine Austria, shows a process of regionalization, leading to the emergence of several regional groups. These new cultures shared many similarities with the preceding Proto-Villanovan culture, particularly regarding funerary customs, but they also displayed innovations of their own.

From around 900 BC, the Villanovan culture, associated with the Etruscans, emerged in Tuscany and parts of Emilia-Romagna, Lazio, Marche and Campania. In the region south of the Tiber (Latium Vetus), the Latial culture developed, associated with the Proto-Latins, while in the north-east of the peninsula the Este culture developed, associated with the Paleo-Veneti. Around the same time, from their territory of origin in central Italy (present-day Umbria and Sabina), the Osco-Umbrians began to emigrate in several waves, through the process of Ver sacrum, the ritualized extension of colonies, in southern Latium, Molise and the whole southern half of the peninsula, replacing the previous tribes, such as the Opici and the Oenotrians. This coincides with the emergence of the Terni culture, which displayed strong similarities to the Celtic cultures of Hallstatt and La Tène. In the initial phase (10th century BC), the Umbrian necropolis of Terni was identical in every aspect to the Celtic-Lepontic necropolis of the Golasecca culture.

=== Antiquity ===
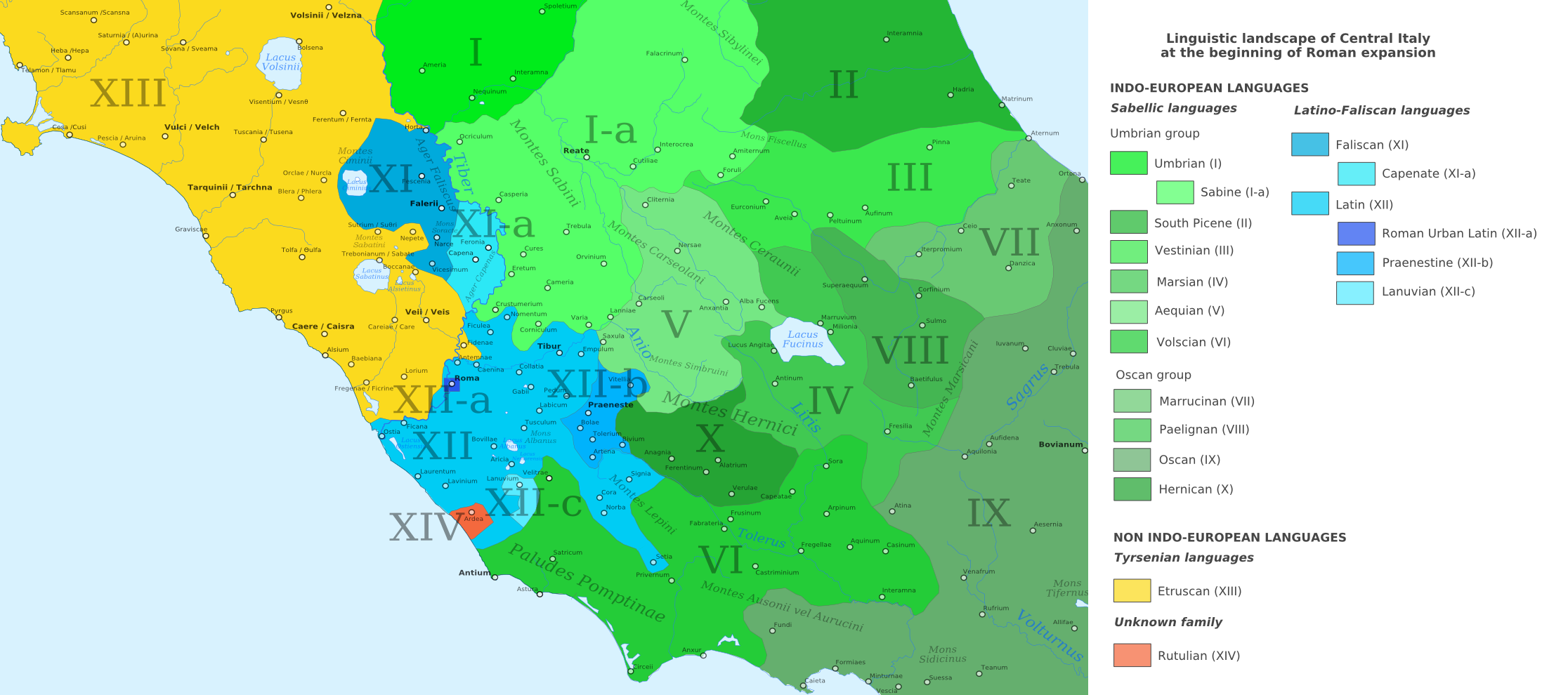
The linguistic landscape of Central Italy at the beginning of Roman expansion

By the mid-first millennium BC, the Latins of Rome were growing in power and influence. This led to the establishment of ancient Roman civilization. In order to combat the non-Italic Etruscans, several Italic tribes united in the Latin League. After the Latins had liberated themselves from Etruscan rule they acquired a dominant position among the Italic tribes. Frequent conflict between various Italic tribes followed. The best documented of these are the wars between the Latins and the Samnites.

The Latins eventually succeeded in unifying the Italic elements in the country. Many non-Latin Italic tribes adopted Latin culture and acquired Roman citizenship. During this time Italic colonies were established throughout the country, and non-Italic elements eventually adopted the Latin language and culture in a process known as Romanization.

In the early first century BC, several Italic tribes, in particular the Marsi and the Samnites, rebelled against Roman rule. This conflict is called the Social War. After Roman victory was secured, all peoples in Italy, except for the Celts of the Po Valley, were granted Roman citizenship.

== Theatre ==
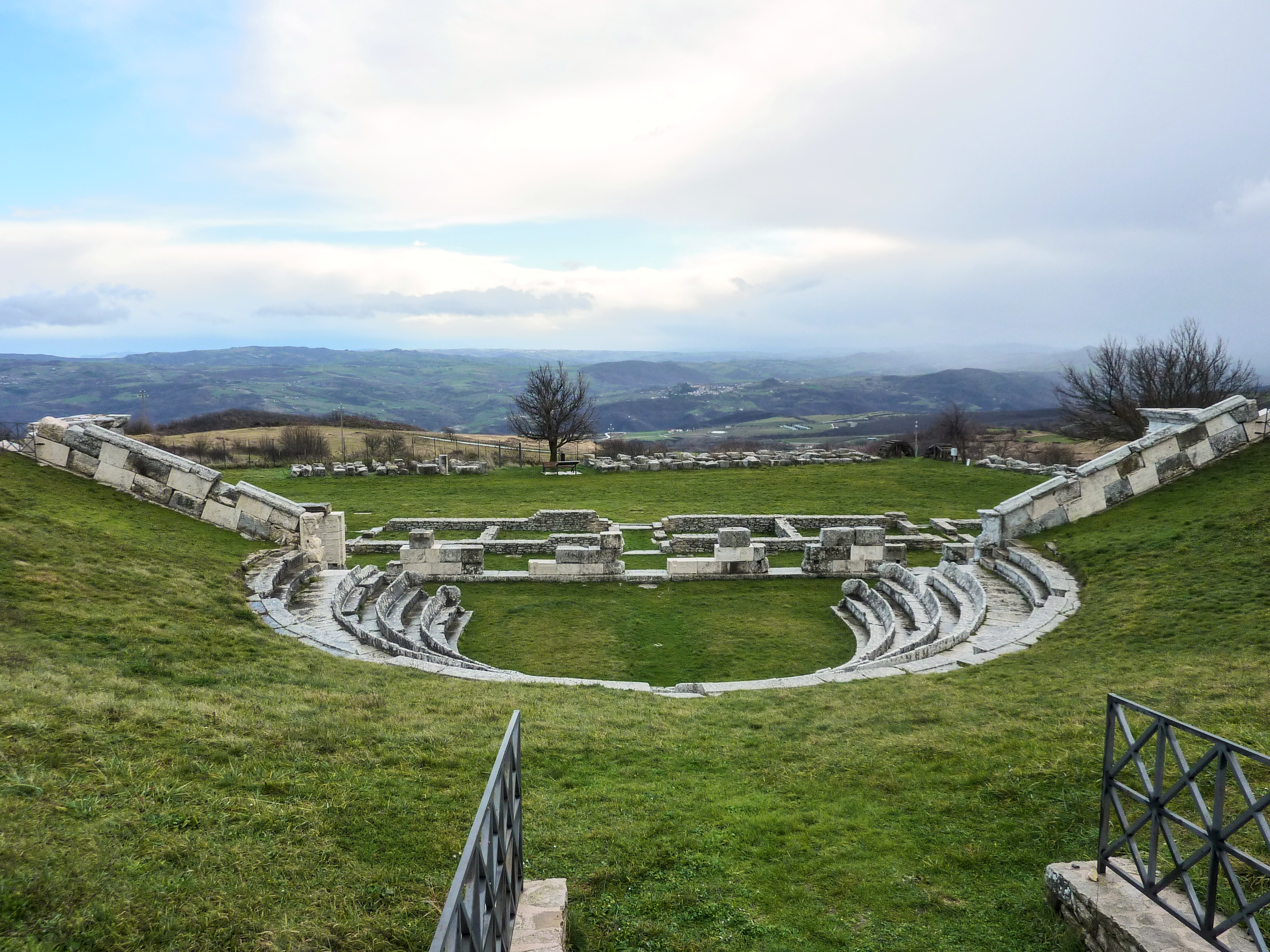
Samnite theater in Pietrabbondante, Molise, Italy

Italian peoples such as the Etruscans had already developed forms of theatrical literature. A very late source, the historian Varro, mentions the name of a certain Volnius who wrote tragedies in the Etruscan language. There is, however, no architectural or artistic evidence of the Etruscan theater.

The legend, also reported by Livy, speaks of how the Romans sought assistance from Etruscan actors and pipe-players doing a sort of song and dance to appease the gods when their own rituals failed to ward off a plague. This predated contacts with Magna Graecia and its theatrical traditions.

Even the Samnites had original theatrical forms, such as the Atellan Farce comedies, that influenced Roman dramaturgy; there is also some architectural evidence such as the theater of Pietrabbondante in Molise, and that of Nocera Superiore on which the Romans built their own. The construction of the Samnite theaters of Pietrabbondante and Nocera evidence the architectural influence of the Greek theater.

== Genetics ==
A genetic study published in Science in November 2019 examined the remains of six Latin males buried near Rome between 900 BC and 200 BC. They carried the paternal haplogroups R-M269, R-311, R-PF7589 and R-P312 and the maternal haplogroups H1aj1a, T2c1f, H2a, U4a1a, H11a and H10. A female from the preceding Proto-Villanovan culture carried the maternal haplogroups U5a2b. These examined individuals were distinguished from preceding populations of Italy by the presence of about 25–35% steppe ancestry. Overall, the genetic differentiation between the Latins, Etruscans and the preceding Proto-Villanovan population of Italy was found to be insignificant. The Iron Age and early Republican Italic and Etruscan samples overlap with present-day Italians and other west Mediterranean populations.

== See also ==
- List of Italic peoples
- Romance-speaking world
- Legacy of the Roman Empire
- Pan-Latinism

== Sources ==
- Anthony, David (2007). The Horse, the Wheel, and Language: How Bronze-Age Riders from the Eurasian Steppes Shaped the Modern World. Princeton University Press. ISBN 978-0-691-05887-0.
- Antonio, Margaret L.; et al. (8 November 2019). "Ancient Rome: A genetic crossroads of Europe and the Mediterranean". Science. 366 (6466). American Association for the Advancement of Science: 708–714. Bibcode:2019Sci...366..708A. doi:10.1126/science.aay6826. PMC 7093155. PMID 31699931.
- Bossong, Georg (2017). "The Evolution of Italic". In Klein, Jared; Joseph, Brian; Fritz, Matthias (eds.). Handbook of Comparative and Historical Indo-European Linguistics. Vol. 2. Walter de Gruyter. ISBN 978-3-11-054243-1.
- Cole, Jeffrey (2011). Ethnic Groups of Europe: An Encyclopedia. ABC-CLIO. ISBN 978-1-59884-302-6.
- Devoto, Giacomo; Buti, Gianna G. (1974). Preistoria e storia delle regioni d'Italia. Florence: Sansoni.
- Devoto, Giacomo (1951). Gli antichi Italici. Florence: Vallechi.
- Fortson, Benjamin W. (2004). Indo-European Language and Culture. Blackwell. ISBN 978-1-4443-5968-8.
- GP (2001). MultiCultural Review: Dedicated to a Better Understanding of Ethnic, Racial, and Religious Diversity, Volume 10. GP Subscription Publications. ISBN 0-8239-9700-6.
- Mallory, J. P.; Adams, Douglas Q., eds. (1997). Encyclopedia of Indo-European Culture. ISBN 1-884964-98-2.
- Minahan, James (2000). One Europe, Many Nations: A Historical Dictionary of European National Groups. Greenwood Publishing Group. ISBN 0-313-30984-1.
- Mommsen, Theodor (1894). The History of Rome. Macmillan.
- Moscati, Sabatino (1998). Così nacque l'Italia: profili di popoli riscoperti. Turin: Società Editrice Internazionale.
- Pigorini, Luigi (1910). Gli abitanti primitivi dell'Italia. Rome: Bertero.
- Pop, Ioan-Aurel (1996). Romanians and Hungarians from the 9th to the 14th century. Romanian Cultural Foundation. ISBN 0-88033-440-1.
- Pop, Ioan-Aurel (1999). Romanians and Romania: A Brief History. East European Monographs. ISBN 973-577-037-7.
- Treptow, Kurt W. [in Romanian] (1996). A History of Romania. East European Monographs. ISBN 0-88033-345-6.
- Villar, Francisco (1997). Gli Indoeuropei e le origini dell'Europa. Bologna: Il Mulino. ISBN 88-15-05708-0.
- Waldman, Carl; Mason, Catherine (2006). Encyclopedia of European Peoples. Infobase Publishing. ISBN 1-4381-2918-1.
