= Castello di Oricola =

Coordinates: 42.0496°N 13.0392°E

Castle of Oricola
- Castello di Oricola
- Oricola
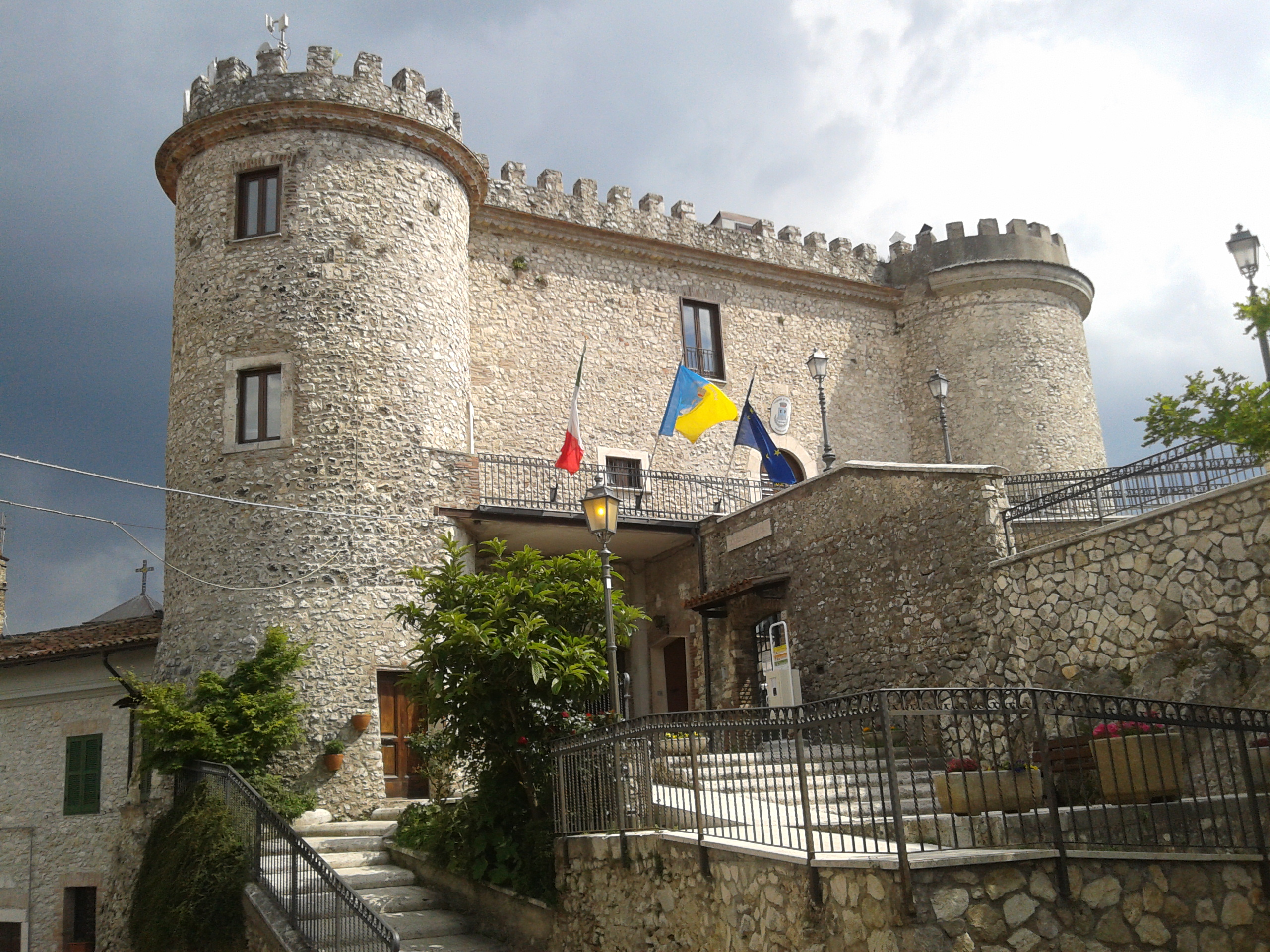
- Castle in Oricola

Site information
- Type: Castle

Location

Site history
- Built: 9th century

Castello di Oricola (Italian for Castle of Oricola) is a medieval castle in Oricola, Province of L'Aquila (Abruzzo).

== History ==
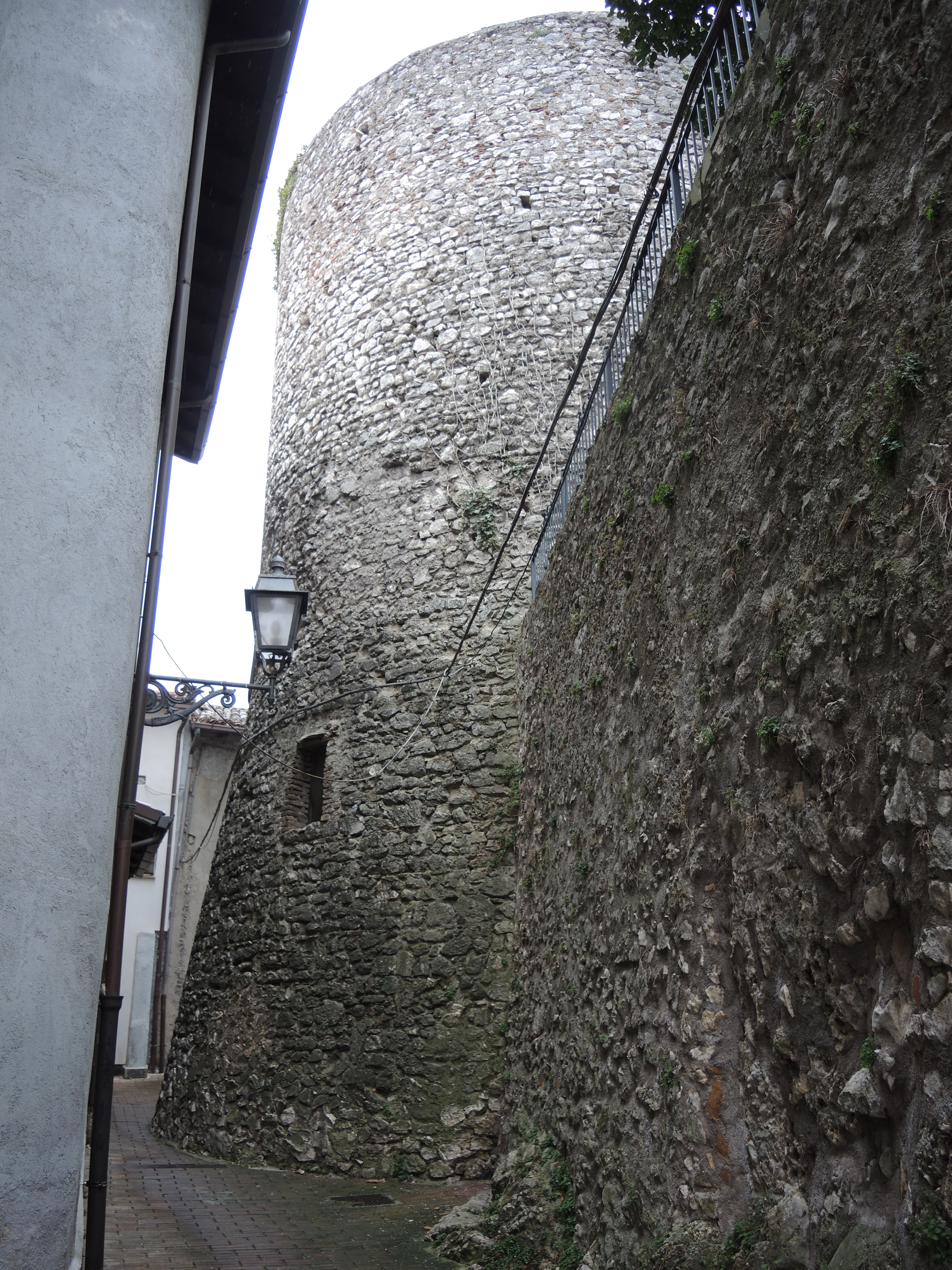
Tower of the castle

The origin of Oricola Castle dates back to the 9th century when Rainaldo, Counts of Marsi, built a fortress along with other towers connected by walls to defend against the incursions of the Saracens and the Hungarians.

In 1096, the castle passed into the hands of Aldegrina or Aldegrima, daughter of Pandolfo (Prince of Capua), Countess of Carsoli, and wife of another Rainaldo, a descendant of the founder who died during the First Crusade. That same year, she donated it to the Abbey of Montecassino. In 1097, the castle of Auricola (the medieval name of the village) was listed among the properties confirmed by the papal bull of Pope Urban II to Abbot Oderisio di Montecassino.

In 1242, the castle was attacked by Frederick II after the destruction of Carsoli, as he pursued fugitives who had taken refuge in Oricola.

In 1381, Oricola became a fief of the Orsini family, and the castle acquired its contemporary configuration thanks to renovations in the mid-15th century. In 1491, it passed to the Colonna family, but in 1528 the Orsini defeated the Colonna near Magliano de' Marsi, and the castle was sacked and subsequently returned to Orsini control.

In 1557, Oricola and the nearby castles were once again invaded and sacked, this time by the troops of the Duchy of Tagliacozzo and Albe.

== Architecture ==
The current castle, located in a dominant position on the "piana del Cavaliere", has a triangular plan with three cylindrical towers at the corners. The two towers on the eastern facade have been completely renovated, while the western tower still retains characteristics of the original construction.

The northwest part of the building is occupied by municipal offices, while on the ground floor of the left side of the main facade, there are post office facilities. The rest of the castle is privately owned.
