= Frattesina =

Coordinates: 45°01′30.36″N 11°39′09.46″E

Frattesina

Frattesina is a place in northern Italy near the town of Fratta Polesine which, in the Late Bronze Age, was responsible for the production of much of the glass found in Europe.

Frattesina was founded on the river Po, and evidence of glass manufacture dates from ca. 1100 to the tenth century BC. Evidence suggests that not only was alkali glass manufactured there, but also that the site was involved in long-distance trade. Evidence of glazing of pottery has also been found.

During the late and final Bronze Age in Italy, Frattesina's industrial community refined metal, made tools from deer antlers, and produced glass beads.

== Research History ==
The settlement of Frattesina, located southeast of the modern town of Fratta Polesine (Province of Rovigo), was discovered in 1967 by members of the Centro Polesano di Studi Storici Archeologici ed Etnografici (C.P.S.S.A.E.) of Rovigo, who published the first reports of the site in the journal Padusa.

The principal investigations at the site were directed by Anna Maria Bietti Sestieri, who conducted eleven excavation campaigns between 1974 and 1989 on behalf of the then Archaeological Superintendency of Veneto. During the same period, thanks to the work of Superintendency officers Maurizia De Min and Luciano Salzani, additional highly significant surface finds were recorded, most notably four founder’s hoards. Furthermore, the two cemeteries associated with the settlement—Fondo Zanotto and Narde—were investigated through several excavation campaigns.

From 2013 onward, surface surveys and field investigations resumed within the settlement area under the auspices of the Archaeology, Fine Arts and Landscape Superintendency for the Provinces of Verona, Rovigo and Vicenza, the C.P.S.S.A.E. of Rovigo, and, since 2019, the Chair of Prehistory and Protohistory at Sapienza University of Rome. Excavations were resumed in 2022 under the direction of Andrea Cardarelli (Sapienza University of Rome) and Paolo Bellintani (C.P.S.S.A.E., Rovigo).

The results of research at Frattesina were comprehensively presented in the 2019 volume Frattesina: un centro internazionale di produzione e di scambio nella tarda età del bronzo del Veneto (“Frattesina: An International Centre of Production and Exchange in the Late Bronze Age of Veneto”), edited by Anna Maria Bietti Sestieri, Paolo Bellintani, and Claudio Giardino and published by the Accademia Nazionale dei Lincei. They also formed the focus of the international conference Frattesina 50 anni dopo. Il Delta del Po tra Europa e Mediterraneo nei secoli attorno al 1000 a.C. (“Frattesina Fifty Years Later: The Po Delta between Europe and the Mediterranean around 1000 BC”), held in 2018 at the Museo dei Grandi Fiumi. The conference proceedings were subsequently published in the 2020 and 2021 volumes of Padusa, the journal of the C.P.S.S.A.E. of Rovigo.

Artefacts recovered from the settlement and cemeteries of Frattesina are currently housed and exhibited at the Museo dei Grandi Fiumi and the Museo Archeologico Nazionale di Fratta Polesine.

== Settlement Characteristics and Environmental Setting ==
Frattesina was a large protohistoric settlement extending over more than 20 hectares. It stretched for approximately 1 km along a west–east axis on the right bank of the Po di Adria, the principal branch of the Po River during the Bronze Age, while its width varied between 100 and 200 m along the north–south axis.

Surface surveys, aerial-photograph interpretation, and coring investigations indicate that the settlement occupied a natural alluvial levee elevated approximately one metre above the surrounding contemporary ground surface. Evidence has also been identified for a network of roughly orthogonal canals or ditches aligned along west–east and north–south axes and connected to the ancient Po channel. These features subdivided the settlement into distinct blocks or sectors.

To date, excavation has revealed three residential structures ranging in size from approximately 40 to 80 m². The close association between domestic areas and craft-production spaces appears to have been a recurrent feature of the settlement. Excavations ongoing since 2022 have uncovered, in close proximity to dwellings, both a bronze hoard and a kiln that was probably used for the production of raw glass.

== Chronology and Cultural Framework ==
On the basis of typological analyses of ceramic assemblages recovered from both surface collections and excavations, together with a number of radiometric dates, four occupational phases have been proposed for the settlement.

The site was probably founded during an advanced stage of the Recent Bronze Age (Phase 1), approximately in the first half of the twelfth century BC. Its period of greatest prosperity occurred during the early and developed stages of the Final Bronze Age (Phase 2), corresponding roughly to the second half of the twelfth and the eleventh centuries BC.

From the perspective of material culture, this phase can be attributed to the Protovillanovan archaeological facies and is characterised by a remarkable expansion of craft activities based on both local and exotic raw materials.

During the tenth century BC (Phase 3), corresponding to the final stage of the Final Bronze Age and the beginning of the Early Iron Age, production activities contracted, particularly those connected with exchange networks extending into the Aegean and Levantine worlds.

Evidence for a fourth occupational phase (Phase 4), presumably still within the Early Iron Age, is sparse and discontinuous.

== Economy and Exchange ==
Most archaeological evidence relating to dwellings, daily life, and specialised craft production dates to Phase 2, the settlement’s period of greatest development. The houses, constructed from wood, brushwood, and thatch, survive primarily as fragments of earthen floors and clay wall plaster, the latter often fired as a consequence of accidental burning.

Clay was also employed in the manufacture of pottery intended primarily for domestic use, as well as tools and tool components such as spindle whorls and loom weights, which constitute the principal evidence for spinning and weaving activities.

Another important local raw material was red deer antler, from which a wide range of implements—including awls, hoes, and handles for metal tools—was produced, together with ornamental objects such as decorated antler discs. Some of these products were evidently intended for exchange.

The subsistence economy, based on agriculture and animal husbandry, appears broadly comparable to that known from pile-dwelling and terramara settlements of the central-eastern Po Plain during the Bronze Age, although pigs are represented in unusually high numbers. What most distinguished Frattesina, however, was the dramatic increase in metallurgical production and the regular influx of raw materials originating from both northern Europe and the eastern Mediterranean. Metalworking, particularly of bronze (an alloy of copper and tin), but also of iron, lead, and gold, is documented by hundreds of artefacts, including weapons and tools—such as swords, spearheads, arrowheads, axes, knives, chisels, saws, and awls—as well as personal ornaments including pins and fibulae.

Associated with metallurgical activities are approximately eighty stone casting moulds and four founder’s hoards. These deposits contained fragments of ingots (plano-convex cakes and pick-ingots) together with worn-out metal objects intended for recycling. Among these are the so-called palette con immanicatura a cannone, artefacts of still uncertain function but particularly abundant at the site.

Lead-isotope analyses suggest that the copper used at Frattesina was obtained from ore deposits located on the southern slopes of the central-eastern Alps. The nearest known sources are those of eastern Trentino (Valsugana), where copper extraction and processing are well documented between the fifteenth and ninth centuries BC.

Raw amber from the Baltic region probably reached Frattesina via the Adige Valley and was subsequently worked on site. Extensive evidence for amber-working workshops was identified in 2009 at Campestrin di Grignano Polesine, a settlement situated a few kilometres east of Frattesina along the Po di Adria. This valuable fossil resin was used to manufacture ornaments, including beads, pendants, and pinheads, in distinctive typological forms such as the Tiryns-type and Allumiere-type beads. Examples occur within the so-called “Treasure Hoard,” a deposit containing personal ornaments and dress accessories made from amber, glass, bronze, ivory, and ostrich eggshell.

Both raw materials and finished products appear to have been integrated into a relatively complex exchange system that, in certain respects, may have resembled market-based transactions. This interpretation is supported by the presence of stone objects closely comparable in both weight and form to Aegean and Near Eastern balance weights.

Evidence for contacts—possibly even direct ones—with the eastern Mediterranean includes fragments of Aegean-type pottery, as well as elephant ivory and ostrich eggshell fragments. Ivory was imported as a raw material and worked locally, as demonstrated by production waste, unfinished pieces, and finished artefacts such as the distinctive “Frattesina-type” combs with arched handles decorated with concentric-circle motifs. The discovery of one such comb at Enkomi suggests both the geographical reach and one of the potential termini of the exchange network in which Frattesina participated.

It is well established that, from the thirteenth century BC onward, connections between the Aegean-Mycenaean world and southern and insular Italy increasingly involved Cypriot and Levantine intermediaries. These networks strongly affected Sardinia but also extended into the northern Adriatic.

It was probably through these contacts—or, more precisely, through the transmission of technologies, raw materials, and semi-finished products during the Recent Bronze Age—that Frattesina developed an intensive glass-bead industry. At present, this represents the earliest securely identified glass-manufacturing centre in continental Europe. Production relied upon both local resources, including Po River sands and plant-derived fluxes, and imported colouring agents, principally copper and cobalt.

This technologically sophisticated craft, closely linked in many respects to metallurgy, is documented by thousands of finished products, processing tools such as crucibles, semi-finished glass ingots intended for remelting, and production waste in a variety of colours including dark blue, light blue, red-surfaced blue, aqua green, and white.

Ring beads, large barrel-shaped beads decorated with spiral trails, and eye beads—the most characteristic products of Frattesina’s workshops—have been identified at dozens of contemporary sites, particularly along the so-called Amber Route, the extensive network of contacts linking the southern Baltic coast with the head of the Adriatic. It is therefore highly likely that glass beads constituted one of the principal commodities exchanged for Baltic amber.
