= Apennine culture =

Technology complex in Italy

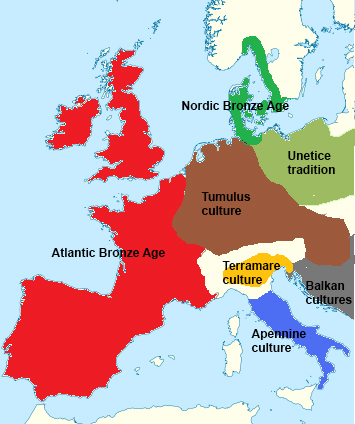
- Western Europe during the Middle Bronze Age: the Apennine culture is in blue, while the Terramare culture is in yellow
- Geographical range: Central Italy, Southern Italy
- Period: Bronze Age
- Dates: 15th-12th centuries BC
- Preceded by: Grotta Nuova facies, Protoapennine facies, Bell Beaker culture
- Followed by: Proto-Villanovan culture

The Apennine culture is a technology complex in central and southern Italy from the Italian Middle Bronze Age (15th–14th centuries BC). In the mid-20th century the Apennine was divided into Proto-, Early, Middle and Late sub- phases, but now archaeologists prefer to consider as "Apennine" only the ornamental pottery style of the later phase of Middle Bronze Age (BM3). This phase is preceded by the Grotta Nuova facies (central Italy) and by the Protoapennine B facies (southern Italy) and succeeded by the Subapennine facies of 13th-century ("Bronzo Recente"). Apennine pottery is a burnished ware incised with spirals, meanders and geometrical zones, filled with dots or transverse dashes. It has been found on Ischia island in association with LHII and LHIII pottery and on Lipari in association with LHIIIA pottery, which associations date it to the Late Bronze Age as it is defined in Greece and the Aegean.

== Society ==
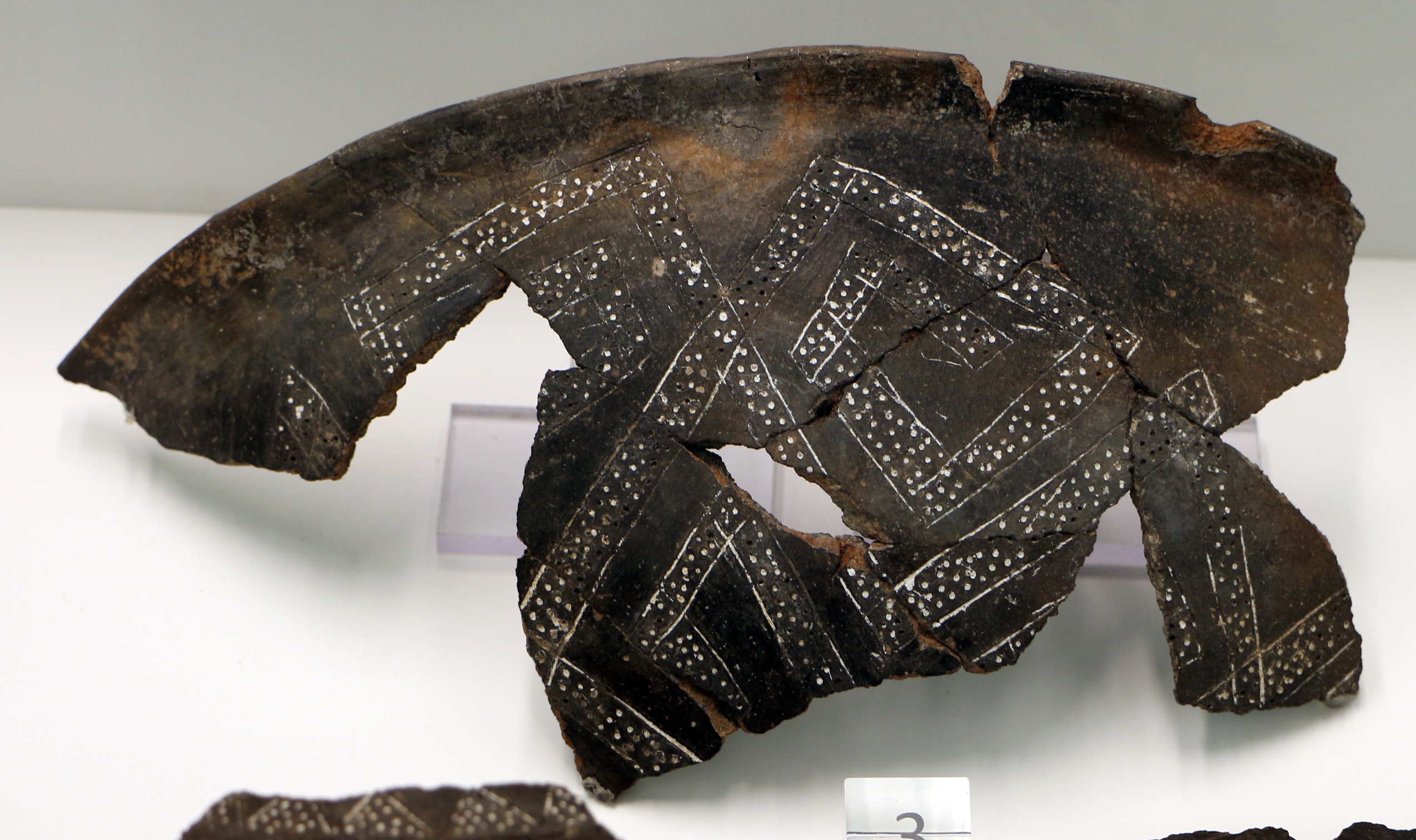
Decorated ceramic vessel shown at the Museo Nazionale della Magna Grecia, Reggio Calabria

The people of the Apennine culture were alpine cattle herdsmen grazing their animals over the meadows and groves of mountainous central Italy. They lived in small hamlets located in defensible places. On the move between summer pastures they built temporary camps or lived in caves and rock shelters. Their range was not necessarily confined to the hills; their pottery has been found on the Capitoline Hill at Rome as well as on the islands mentioned above.

The linguistic affiliations of the Apennine culture are unknown, but Massimo Pallottino speculated that the Apennine culture was practiced mainly by speakers of unknown languages in the Italic branch of Indo-European, from which the historical languages descended. However, the Proto-Italic language is more commonly hypothesized to have been introduced to the Italian peninsula by the later Proto-Villanovan culture (1200–900 BC), and perhaps by the contemporary but more northerly Terramare culture (1700–1150 BC).

== Sites ==
Some of the major sites of the culture are described below.

=== Latium (Lazio) ===
==== Colle della Capriola ("Capriola hill") ====
Capriola hill is located 5 km (3.1 mi) to the south of Bolsena on the eastern side of Lake Bolsena. In ancient times Bolsena was part of Etruria. In addition to remains of Etruscan structures there is a distinct site representing a hamlet of the Apennine Culture that was occupied continuously from the late Neolithic through the Eneolithic, indicating that the population existed before the Apennine and adopted it by cultural diffusion. Excavated by Bloch in 1958 the site evidences wattle-and-daub huts with thatched roofs supported by internal poles. The huts were about 5 m (16 ft) by 3 m (9.8 ft) placed on rock-cut foundations. They were surrounded with stone walls for individual defence.

==== Luni sul Mignone ====
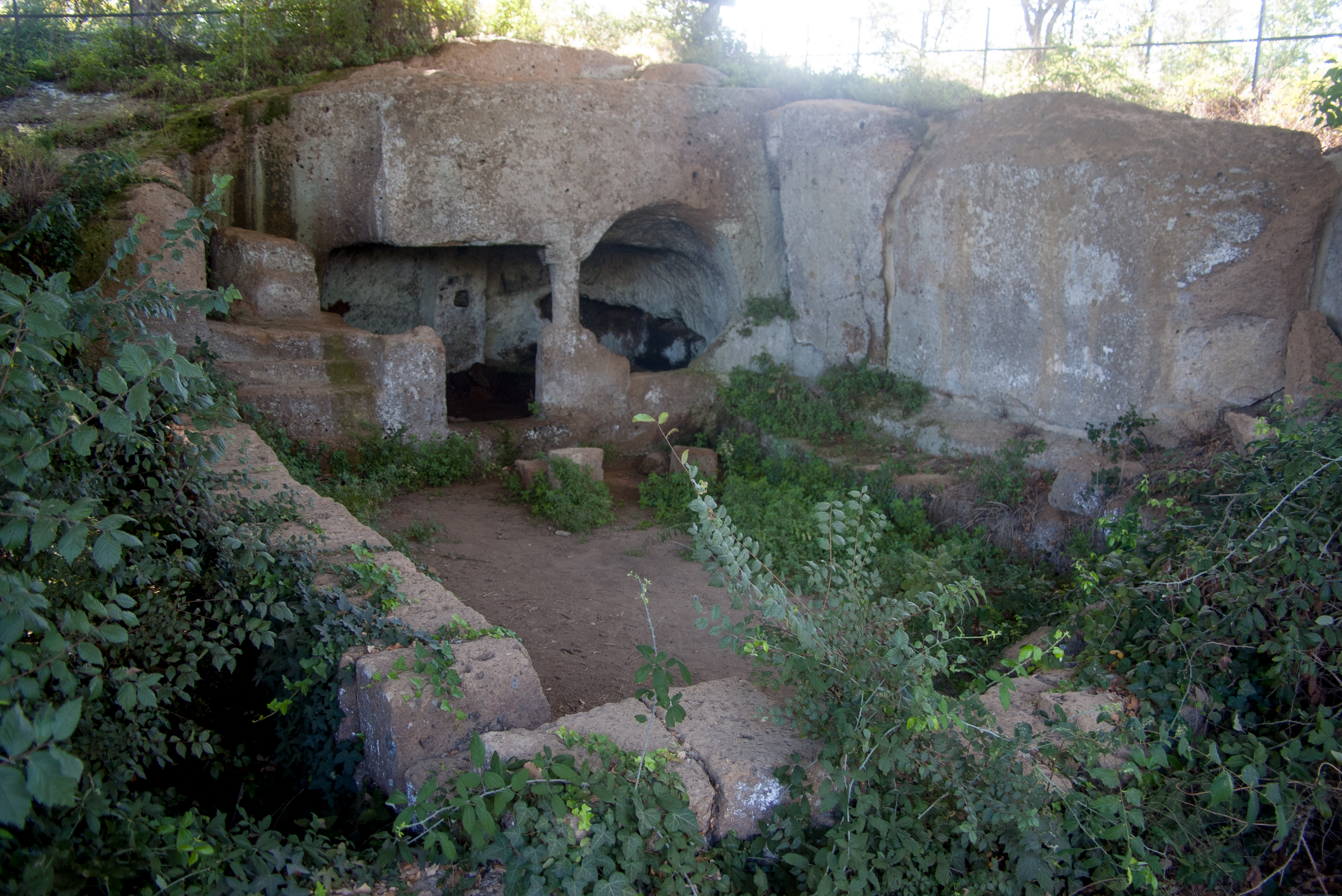
The monumental building at Luni sul Mignone

At approximately 10 km from Blera (northern Lazio) to the west of the frazione of Civitella Cesi, on the left bank of the small Mignone river, next to an abandoned railroad bridge is the acropolis of Luni sul Mignone. The place has been abandoned for centuries (except for archaeologists) and is inaccessible except by foot from Civitella Cesi.

On the acropolis and in a plain to the east, Tre Breci, is a site continuously occupied from the Neolithic to the Iron Age, in addition to the remains of Etruscan Luni (which was then in Etruria) on a higher plateau nearby. The Etruscan citadel is later. Part of the sequence of tre Breci belongs to the Apennine Culture.

This site was excavated 1960–1963 by the Swedish Institute at Rome and numerous C-14 dates and the association of Late Helladic pottery with Apenninic pottery, both found there, were used to date the Apenninic pottery phases. Carl Eric Östenberg summarized them as: I (1350/1300–1250), II (1250–1150), III (1150–1000), IVA (1000–850) and IVB (850–800); that is, the Apenninic there is Late Bronze Age persisting to 800 BC without the Villanovan.

Noteworthy at the site are the foundations of three houses cut into rock as deep as 2.2 m (7.2 ft), with rammed earth over limestone chips for floors. The lengths are 7 m (23 ft), 42 m (138 ft) and 30 m (98 ft) at 4 m (13 ft) wide. The walls were stone with possibly thatched roofs. There were multiple entrances. Pottery was chiefly cooking ware. Portable hearths and hand mills were found, along with remains of wheat, barley, beans and peas. The animal bones were chiefly cattle but also pigs, sheep and goats. The population apparently farmed and raised animals. The size of the dwellings and the multiple entrances may indicate multi-family residences.

=== Apulia (Puglia) ===
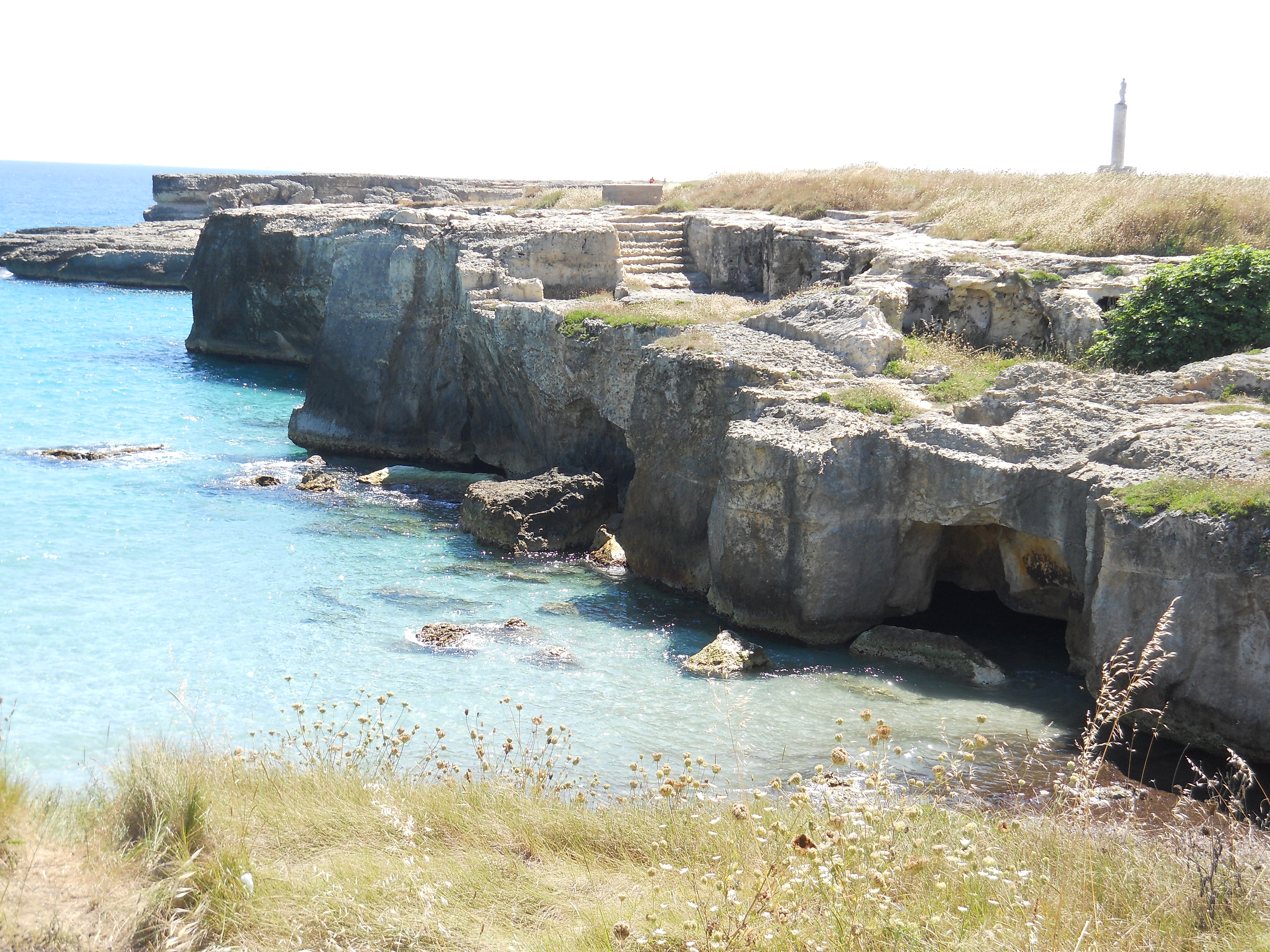
View of Rocca Vecchia

==== Roca Vecchia ====
Roca Vecchia is an archaeological site located on the Adriatic coast of Apulia in Southern Italy, a few kilometres from the modern town of Melendugno and close to the city of Lecce. The site, which has been explored since the end of the 1980s by a team of the University of Salento, has produced some of the best-preserved monumental architecture of the Bronze Age (2nd millennium BC) in Southern Italy, including a very large stone fortification wall, and a large wooden 'temple' building, along with the largest set of Mycenaean pottery ever recovered west of mainland Greece.

==== Coppa Nevigata ====
Southwest of Manfredonia, on the coast of the Gargano in northern Apulia, are the remains of a site initially occupied during the Neolithic, and reoccupied during the Protoapennine, Apennine, and Subapennine phases of the Bronze Age. The site was fortified and has evidence of early purple dye and olive oil production, as well as contacts with the civilizations of the Aegean.

=== Campania ===
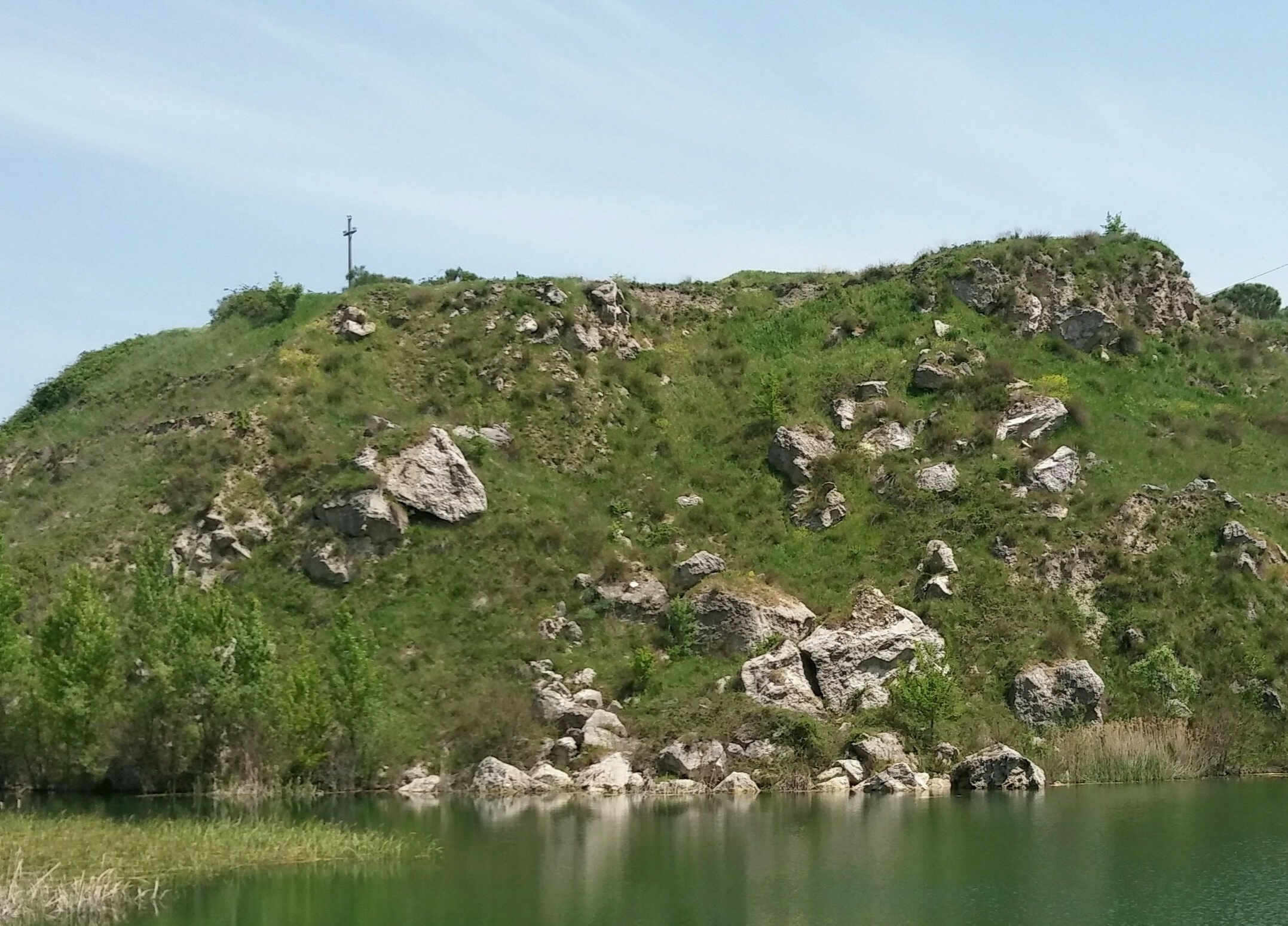
View of La Starza

==== La Starza ====
Astride Campanian Apennine, near modern Ariano Irpino, La Starza was the more ancient populated place in Campania region. It was continuously inhabited since 6th millennium until c. 900 BC, so traces of the entire Apennine culture were left there.

==== Nola ====
The Avellino eruption of Vesuvius in the Bronze Age preserved the pottery and remains of a village of the Apennine Culture in and under sediments from pyroclastic flow. The site is in the comune of Nola, at the locality of Croce del Papa. Unusual about the site is that the forms of perishable objects could be recovered with clarity from the cavities they left in the ash. Remains of goats were found, and also the hoof-prints of goats, sheep, pigs and cattle. Also striking are the thousands of human footprints left in the semi-indurated ash by the population fleeing into the Apennines. The remains suggest that Italics were present in Campania since at least the Middle Bronze Age.

== Gallery ==
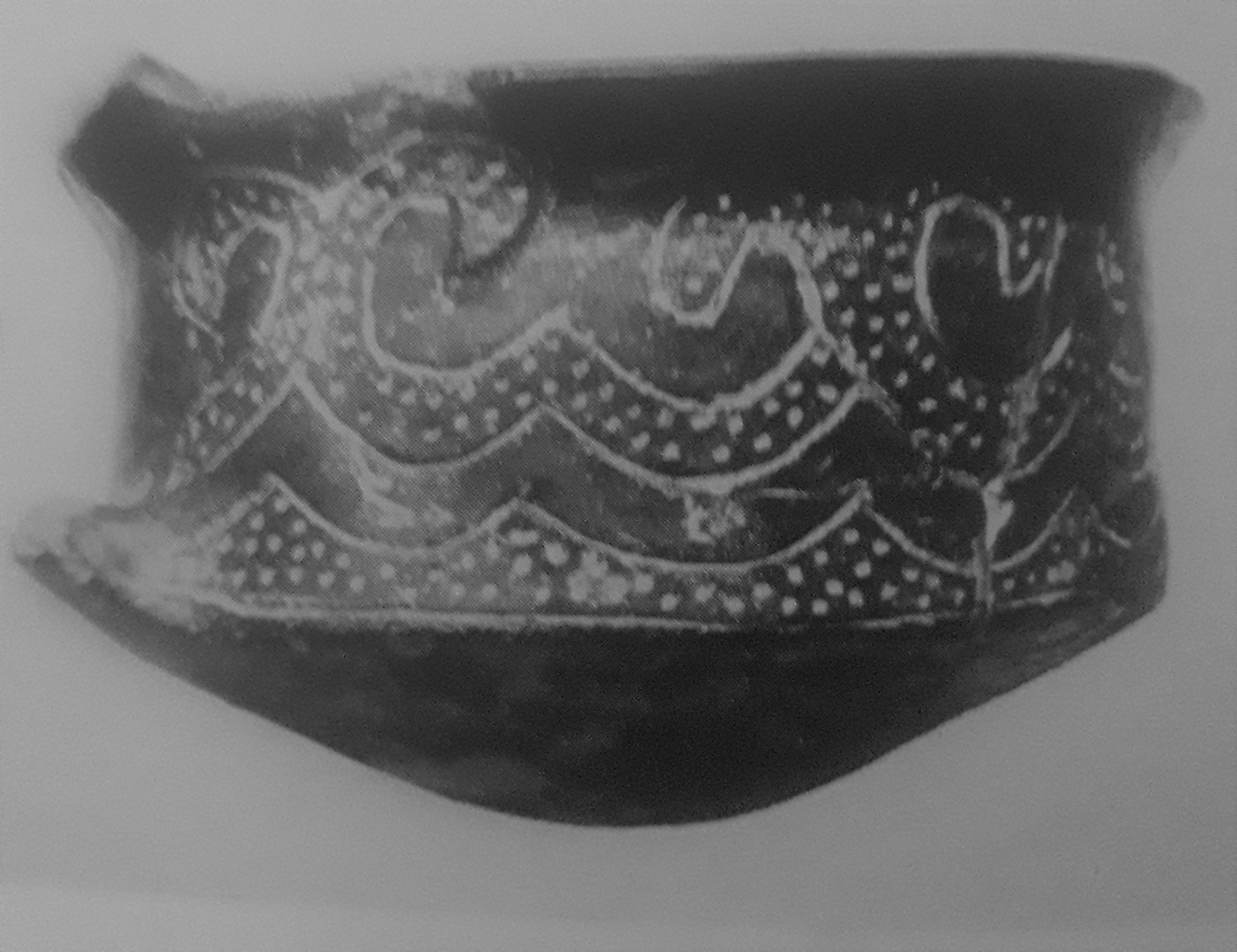
Apennine culture ceramic vessel

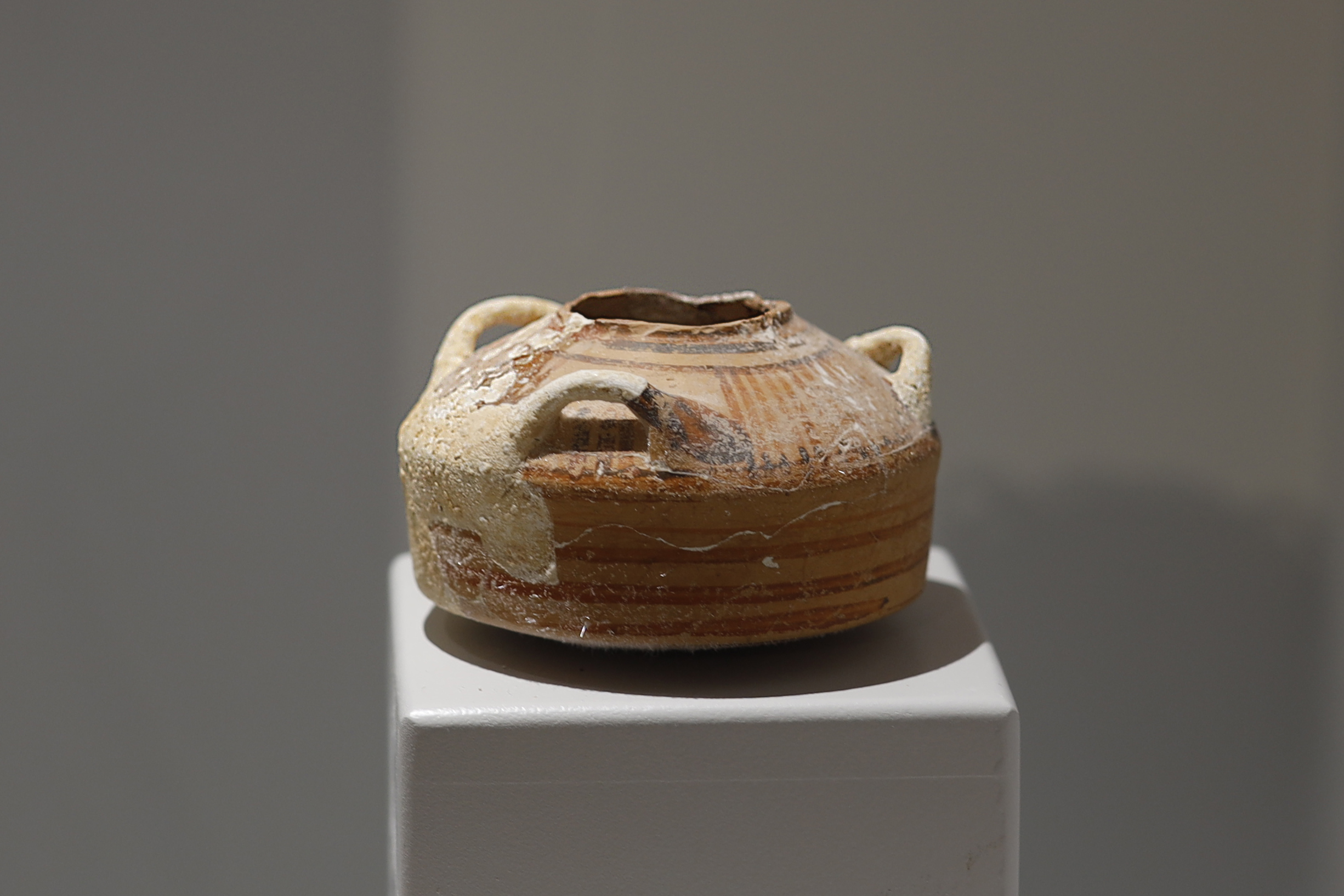
Mycenaean pottery from Torre Santa Sabina

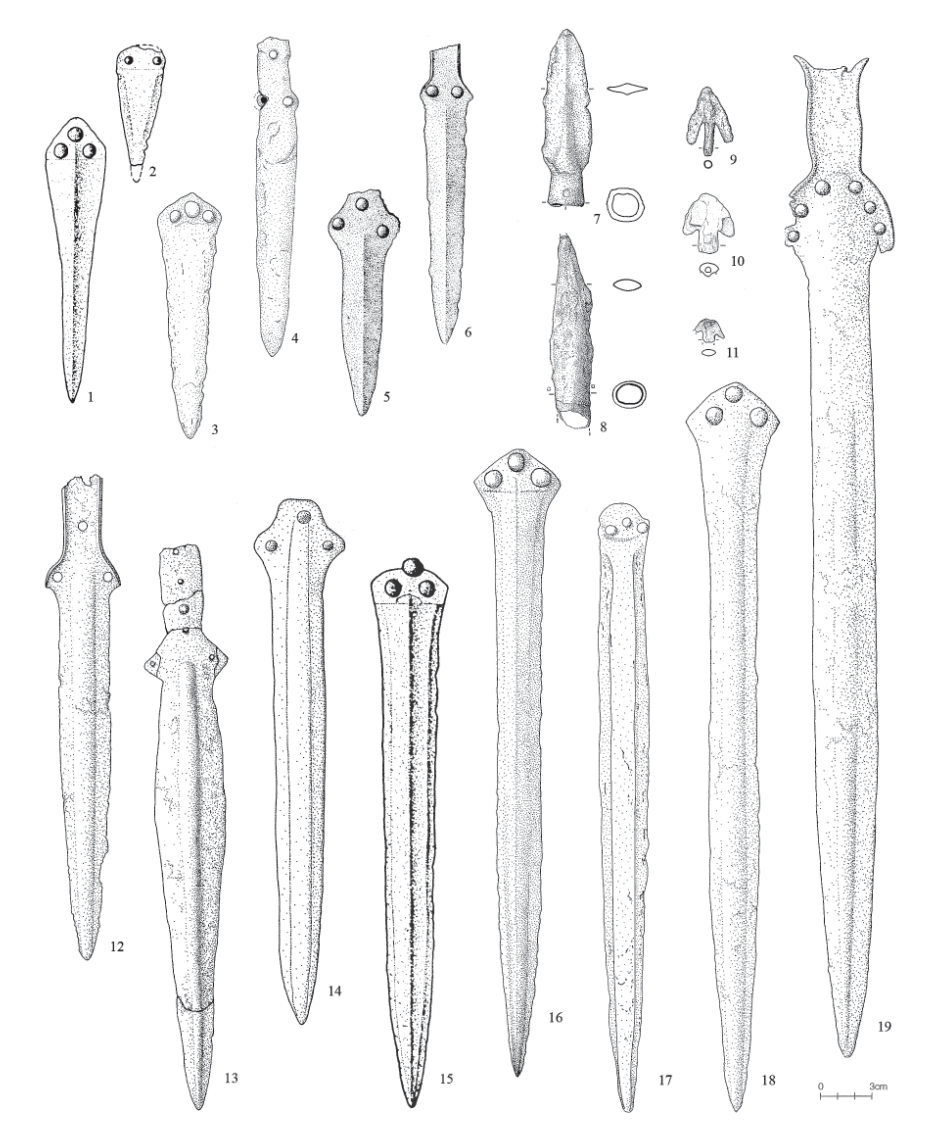
Bronze weapons from south-eastern Italy

== Genetics ==
A 2023 study by Hannah M. Moots et al. analyzed the ancient DNA of 4 individuals of the Apennine culture from the Pian Sultano necropolis, near Cerveteri, in northern Lazio, dating back to the Middle Bronze Age. The most important ancestral component was that of the Early European Farmers, followed by those of the Western Steppe Herders and the Western Hunter-Gatherers.

== See also ==
- Ancient peoples of Italy
- Prehistoric Italy
- Terramare culture
- Vučedol culture
- Urnfield culture
