= Middle-Danube Urnfield culture =

Late-Bronze Age culture of Europe

- Culture
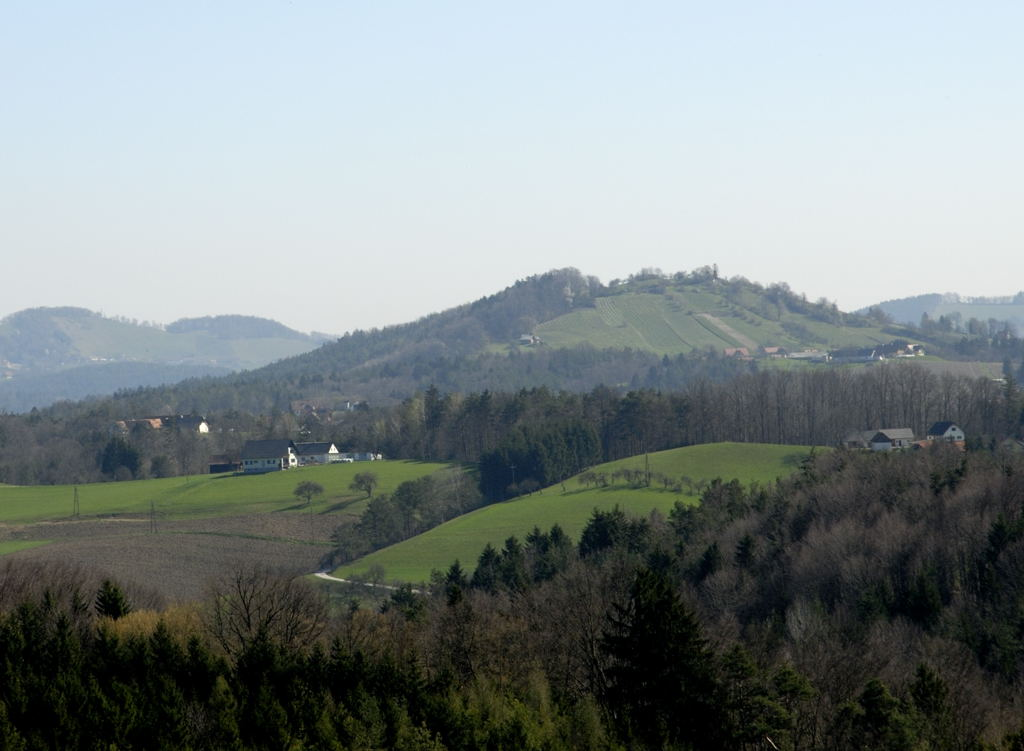
- The Burgstallkogel (Grillkogel) in the Sulm valley, the site of an Urnfield and Hallstatt culture settlement from 800-600 B.C.
- Location: Middle Danube region

The Middle-Danube Urnfield culture (c. 1300 BC – 800 BC) was a late Bronze Age culture of the middle Danube region.

== See also ==
- Urnfield culture

== Bibliography ==
- Gedl, Marek (1985). Archeologia pierwotna i wczesnośredniowieczna, część III Epoka brązu i wczesna epoka żelaza w Europie, Drukarnia Uniwersytetu Jagielońskiego, Kraków.
- Encyklopedia historyczna świata, tom I, Prehistoria, pod red. Janusza Krzysztofa Kozłowskiego, Agencja Publicystyczno-Wydawnicza Opres, Kraków 1999.
