= South-German Urnfield culture =

The South-German Urnfield culture developed in the regions of Southern Germany in the Bronze Age. The culture existed as early as 1000 B.C.E. The culture made Late Bronze Age pottery, including storage pots with "bulging body, more or less everted rim, and constricted neck". It was a largely male-dominated warrior culture.
