= Pietra di Bismantova =

Geological formation in the Reggiano Apennines, in Italy

Coordinates: 44.4198°N 10.4104°E

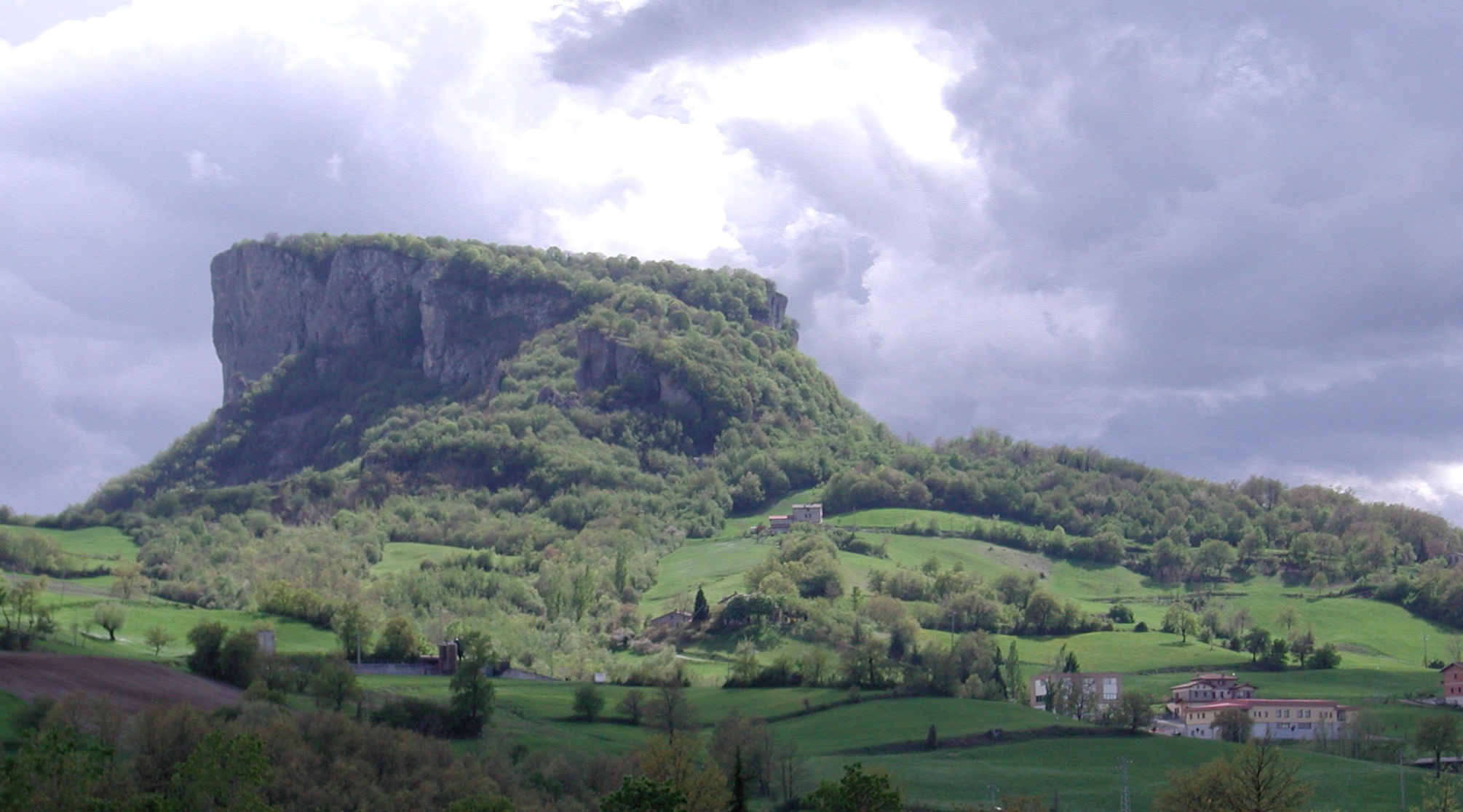
Pietra di Bismantova seen from Croce, in the comune of Castelnovo ne' Monti.

The Pietra di Bismantova (literally Stone of Bismantova) is a geological formation (monadnock or inselberg) in the Reggiano Apennines, in the comune of Castelnovo ne' Monti, province of Reggio Emilia, Northern Italy, c. 45 kilometres (28 mi) from Reggio Emilia. It has the shape of a narrow, quasi-cylindrical plateau (measuring 1 km x 240 m) whose steep walls rise 300 metres (980 ft) as an isolated spur from the nearby hills. The top has an elevation of 1,047 metres (3,435 ft) above sea level. It is included in the National Park of the Appennino Tosco-Emiliano.

The spur is composed of yellowish calcarenite over a marl basement, all formed in the Miocene as a sea bottom. It includes fossils belonging to a tropical environment. It is surrounded by woods, mostly of hazel trees (Corylus avellana).

The Pietra di Bismantova is mentioned by Dante Alighieri in his Divine Comedy (Purgatory, IV, 25-30).

The Pietra di Bismantova is the subject of a documentary film titled La Montagna Magica Il mistero di Bismantova (The Magic Mountain: The Mystery of Bismantova), directed by Reggio Emilia-based filmmaker Massimo Dallaglio, with a screenplay by Francesco Gerardi.

== See also ==
- Inselberg
