= Situla (disambiguation) =

Situla is the Latin for bucket or pail, and is used in archaeology and art history for a variety of historic objects with this shape.

Situla can also mean:

- Situla culture or "situla art", a phase of the European Iron Age in north Italy, Slovenia etc., when decorated bronze situlas were prominent
  - Situla of the Pania, Etruscan, ivory
  - Situla Benvenuti, north Italy
  - Vače Situla Slovenia
- Kappa Aquarii, a star in the constellation Aquarius
- Nassa situla, a sea snail of family Nassariidae
- USS Situla (AK-140), a US Navy cargo ship, in service 1943–1946
