= Este culture =

Iron Age culture around Veneto, Italy

- Geographical range: Northeast Italy
- Period: Bronze Age, Iron Age
- Dates: c. 900 BC – 182 BC
- Preceded by: Proto-Villanovan culture
- Followed by: Roman Republic

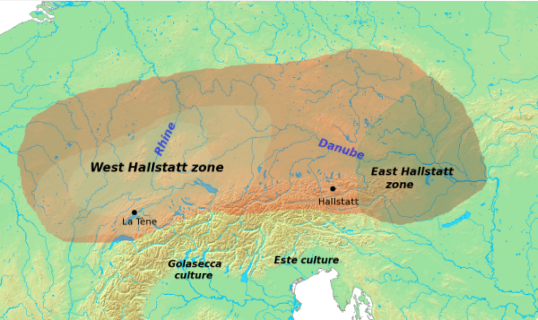
Situation of the Este culture to the south of the Hallstatt culture.

The Este culture or Atestine culture was an archaeological culture existing from the late Italian Bronze Age (10th–9th century BC, proto-venetic phase) to the Iron Age and Roman period (1st century BC). It was located in the modern area of Veneto in Italy and derived from the earlier and more extensive Proto-Villanovan culture. It is also called the "civilization of situlas", or Paleo-Venetic.

The culture is named after a proto-urban settlement in the Po Valley (Northern Italy). The city of Este was originally situated on the river Adige, which changed its course in 5th century; it was a center of metalworking. The settlement evolved in the beginning of the 1st century BC at the cross-way of important traffic routes. Essentially only the cemeteries with cremated burials and sometimes rich grave goods survive for modern archaeology to explore.

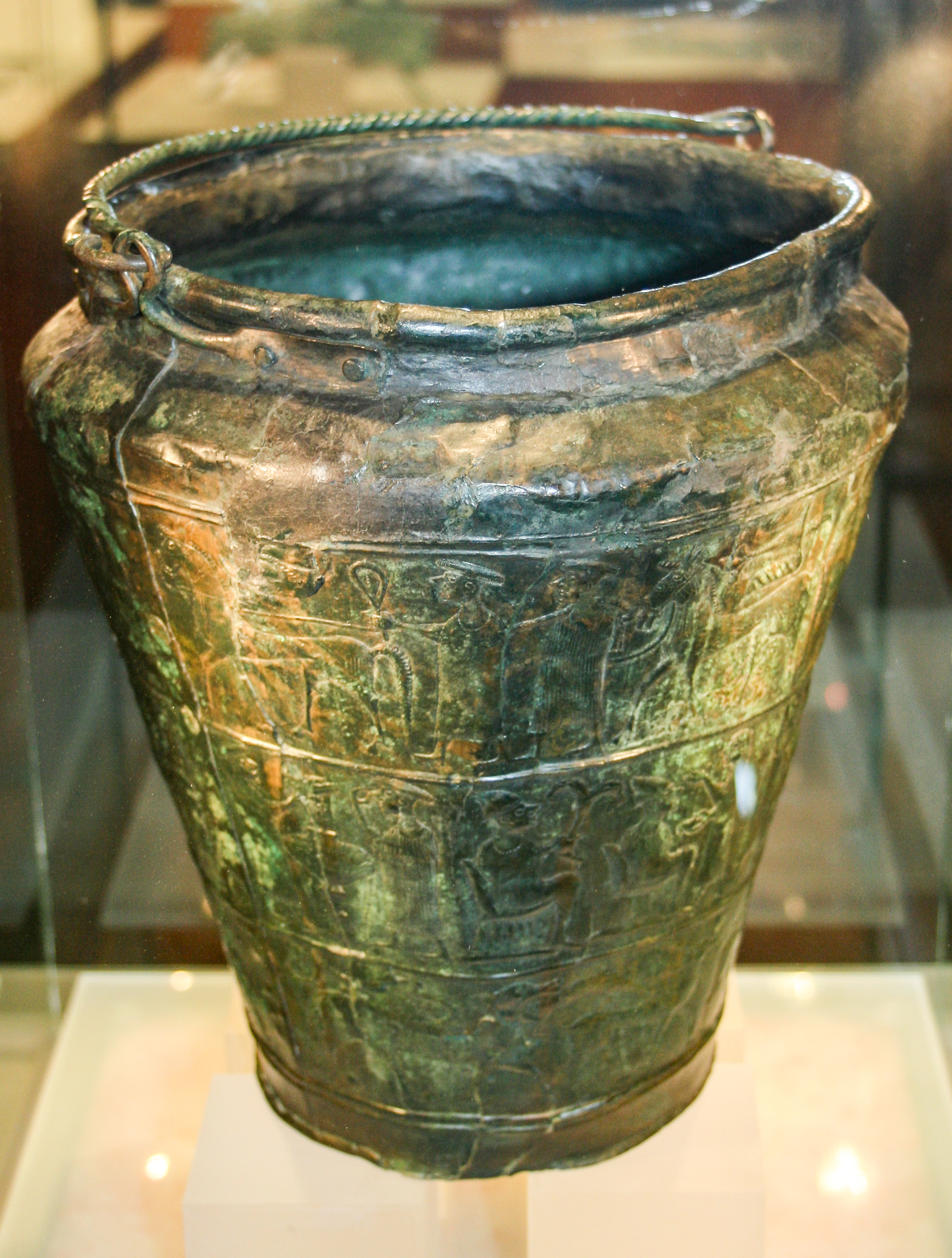
The Vače Situla, Slovenia

The Este culture existed next to the Villanovan Culture in the Bologna area and the Golasecca culture in the western Po Valley. It was influenced by the Urnfield culture contemporary to the Hallstatt period. Este had artistic and technical influence on the Hallstatt region to the north and the Etruscan civilization to the south. Este was the center of the so-called situlae art. In particular, situlas decorated with horizontal rows of animals and human figures are characteristic of this culture. One of the most famous of these is the Benvenuti Situla (600 BC).

The evolution of the bronze foil works can be traced to the end of the 4th century BC. The Este culture withstood the invasion of the Celts, and was only later absorbed by Rome.

Several archaeological discoveries provide evidence that Este was an important centre of Venetic culture from the 7th to the 4th century BC. They had a large shrine to the god or goddess Reitia and a school for scribes. Archaeologists found next to small bronze statues, tools, vases and money, some 200 inscriptions in the Venetic script and the so-called Alphabet Tablets.

The Veneti (including the Este population) formed a buffer between the Illyrians, whose tribal area was located in the Balkans to the East of Trieste, and the Celts in the Po Valley. They had their own language and culture, which became increasingly open to Greek influence; but it did not imitate the Greek or Etruscan culture. The Veneti continued the tradition of the Este culture, when it expired in Este.

Four archaeological phases may be distinguished: Este I (from 900 to 750 BC); Este II (from 750 to 575 BC), which has an individual character; Este III (from 575 to 350 BC), the climax corresponding to the necropolis at the Certosa of Bologna; and Este IV (from 350 to 182 BC), showing Celtic influences.

== Gallery ==
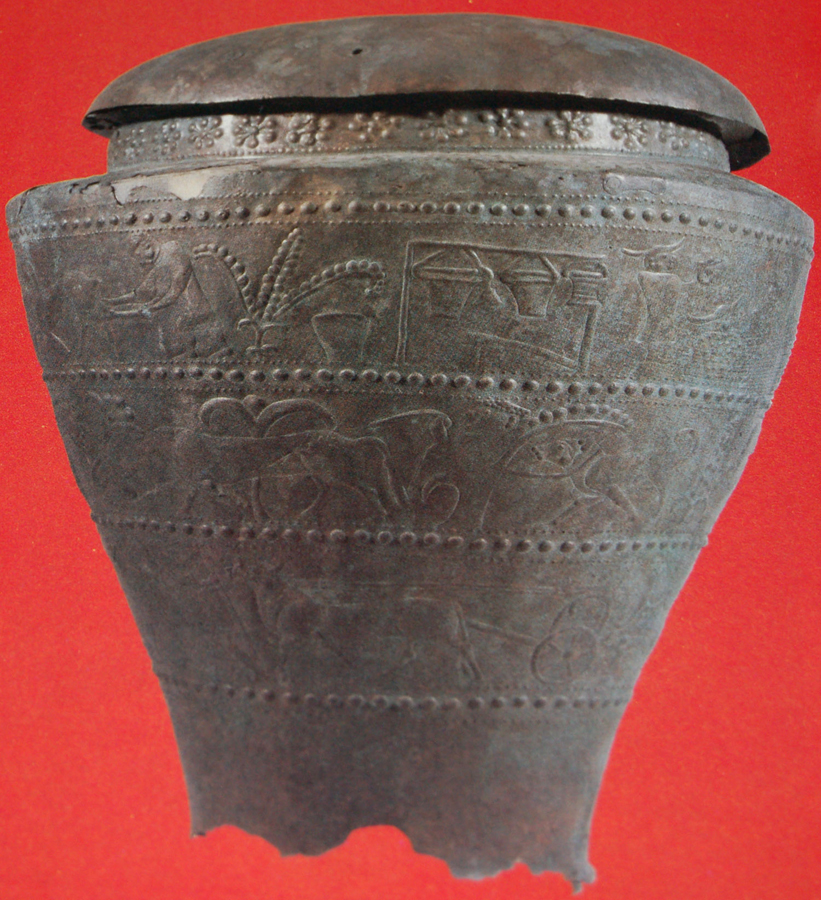

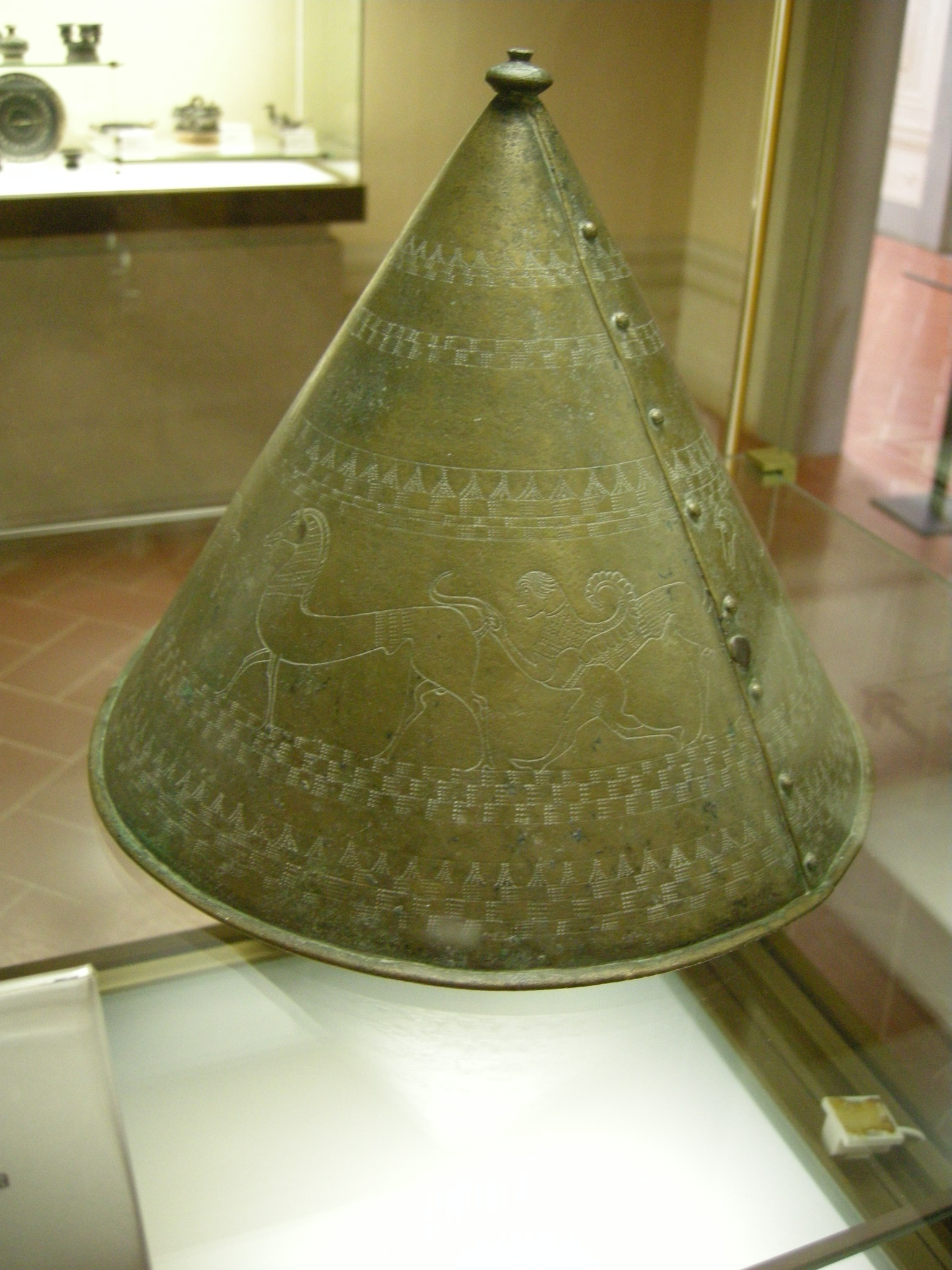

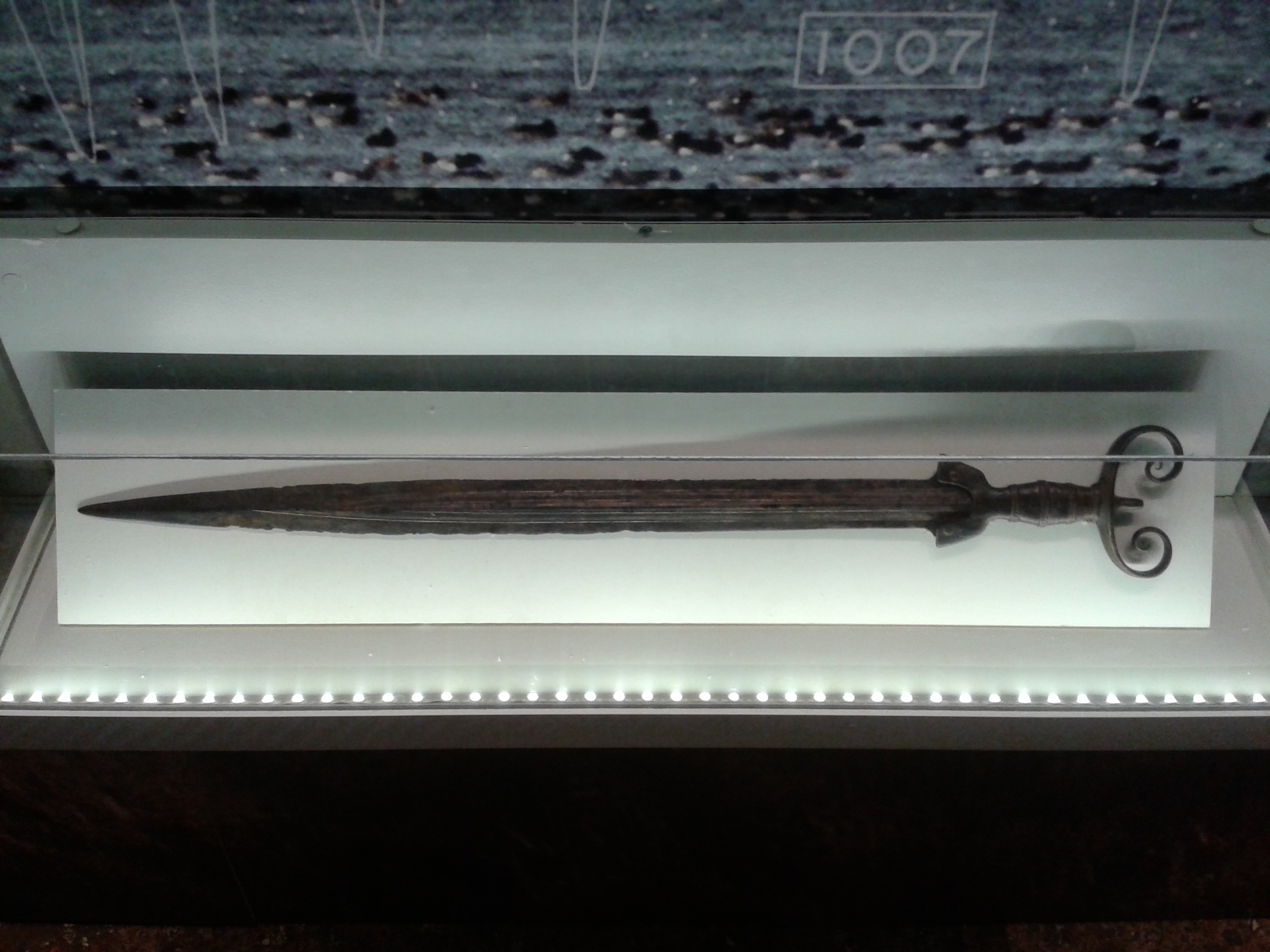

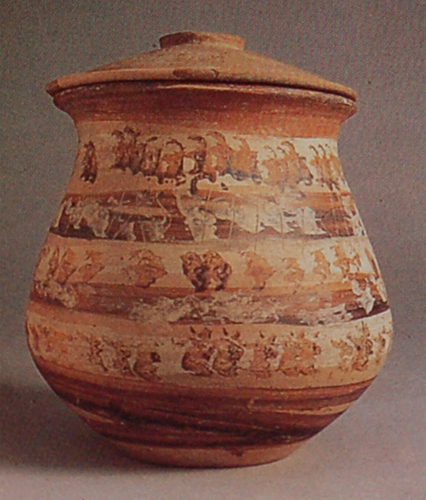

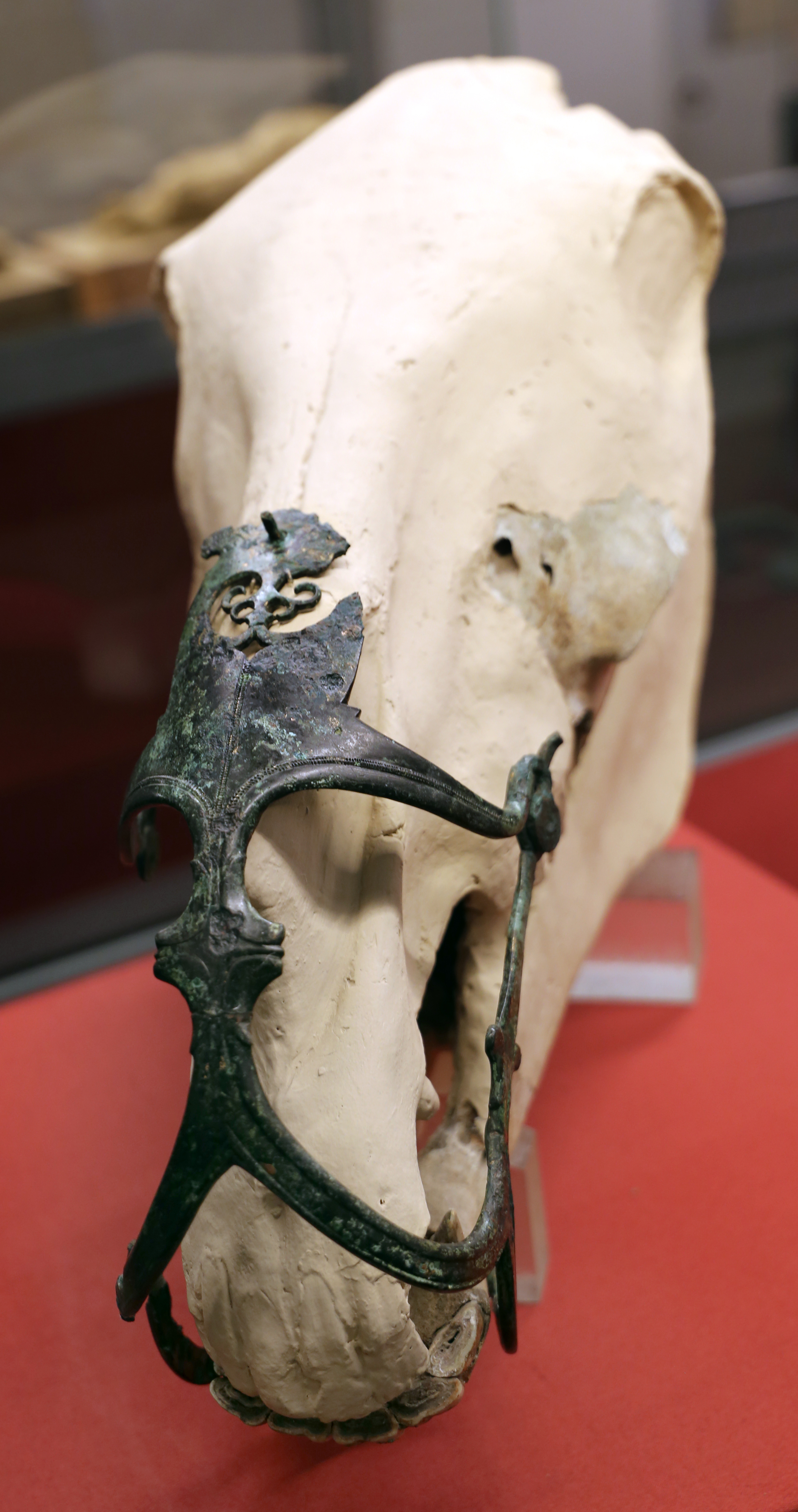

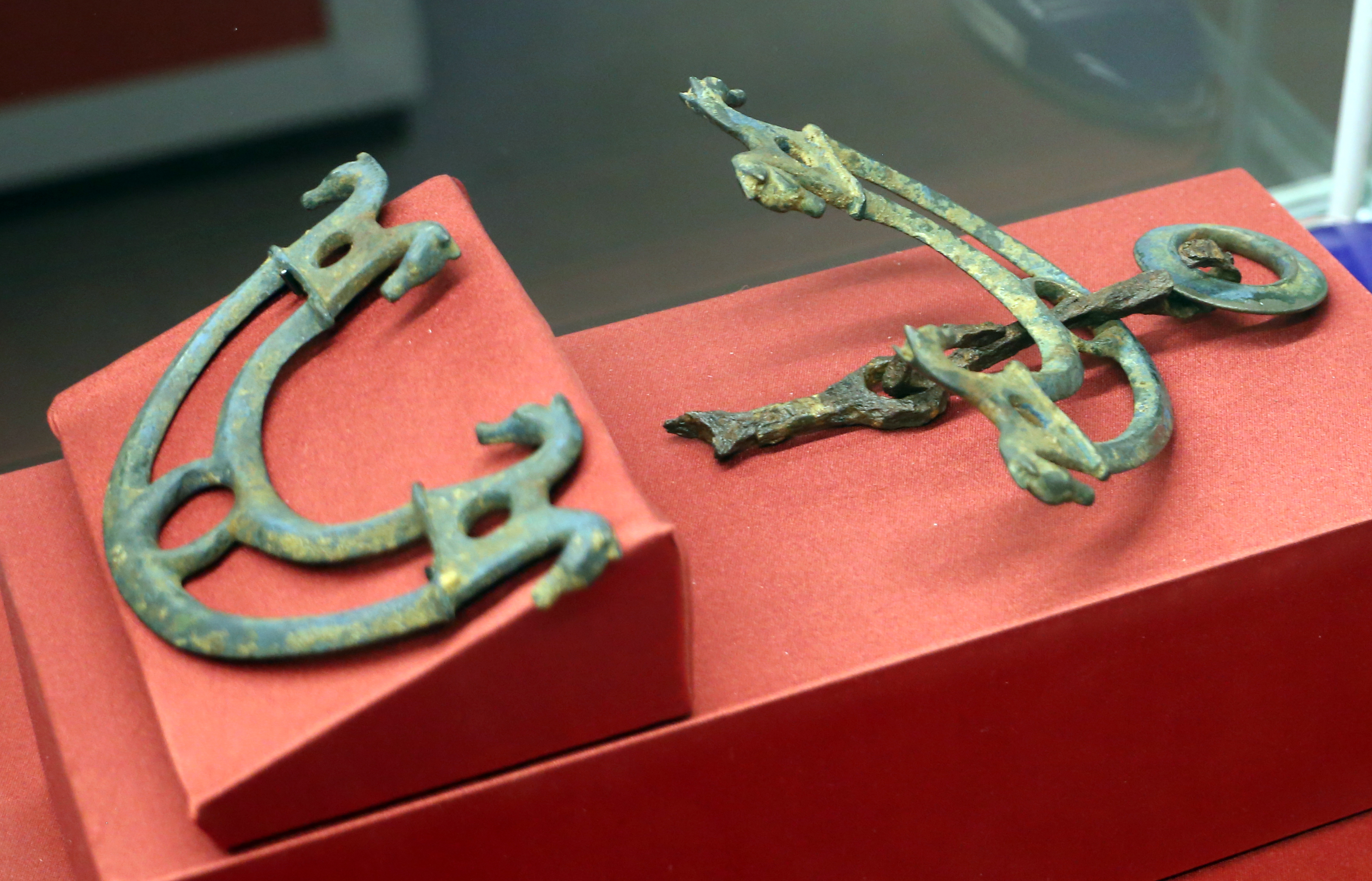

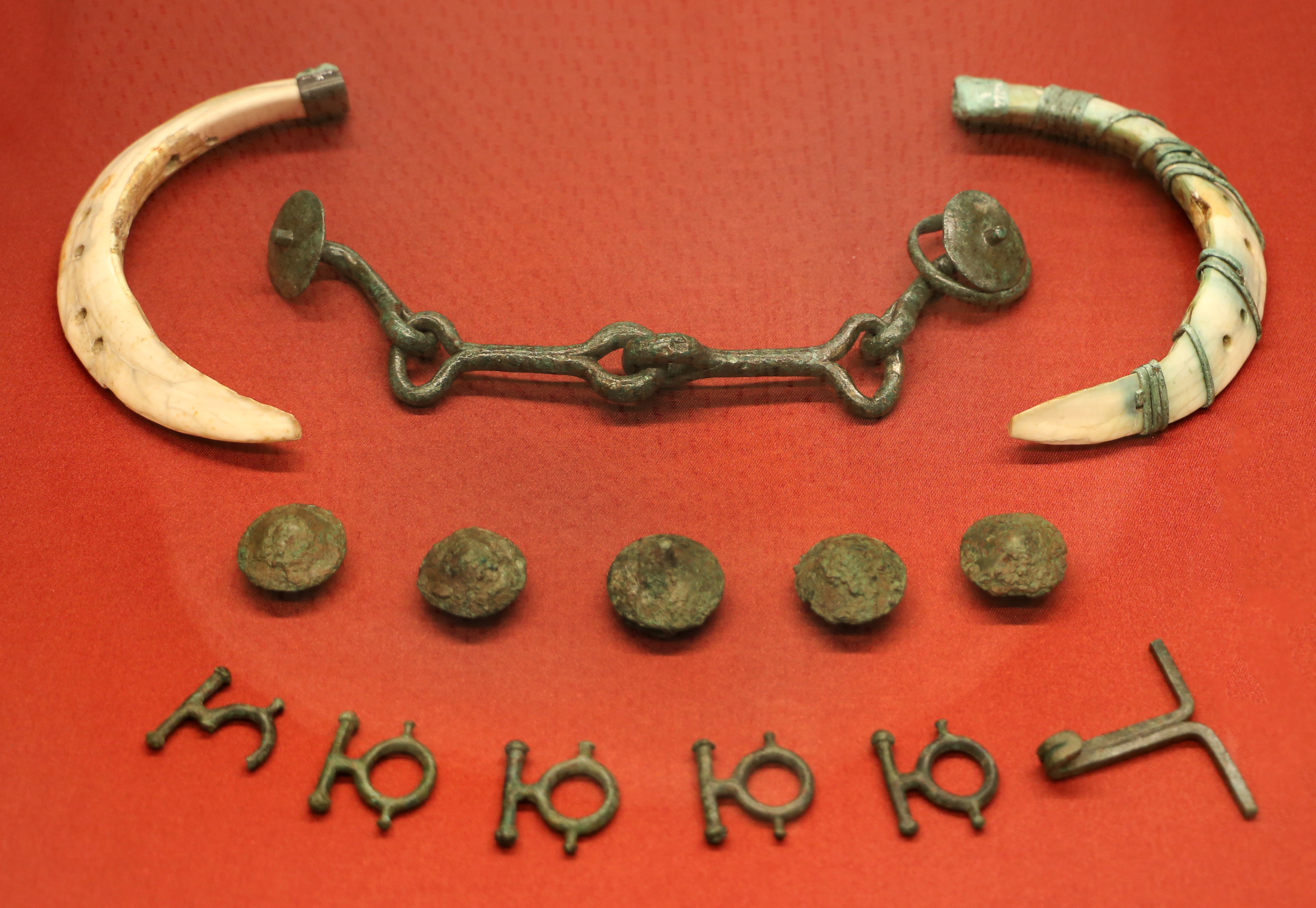

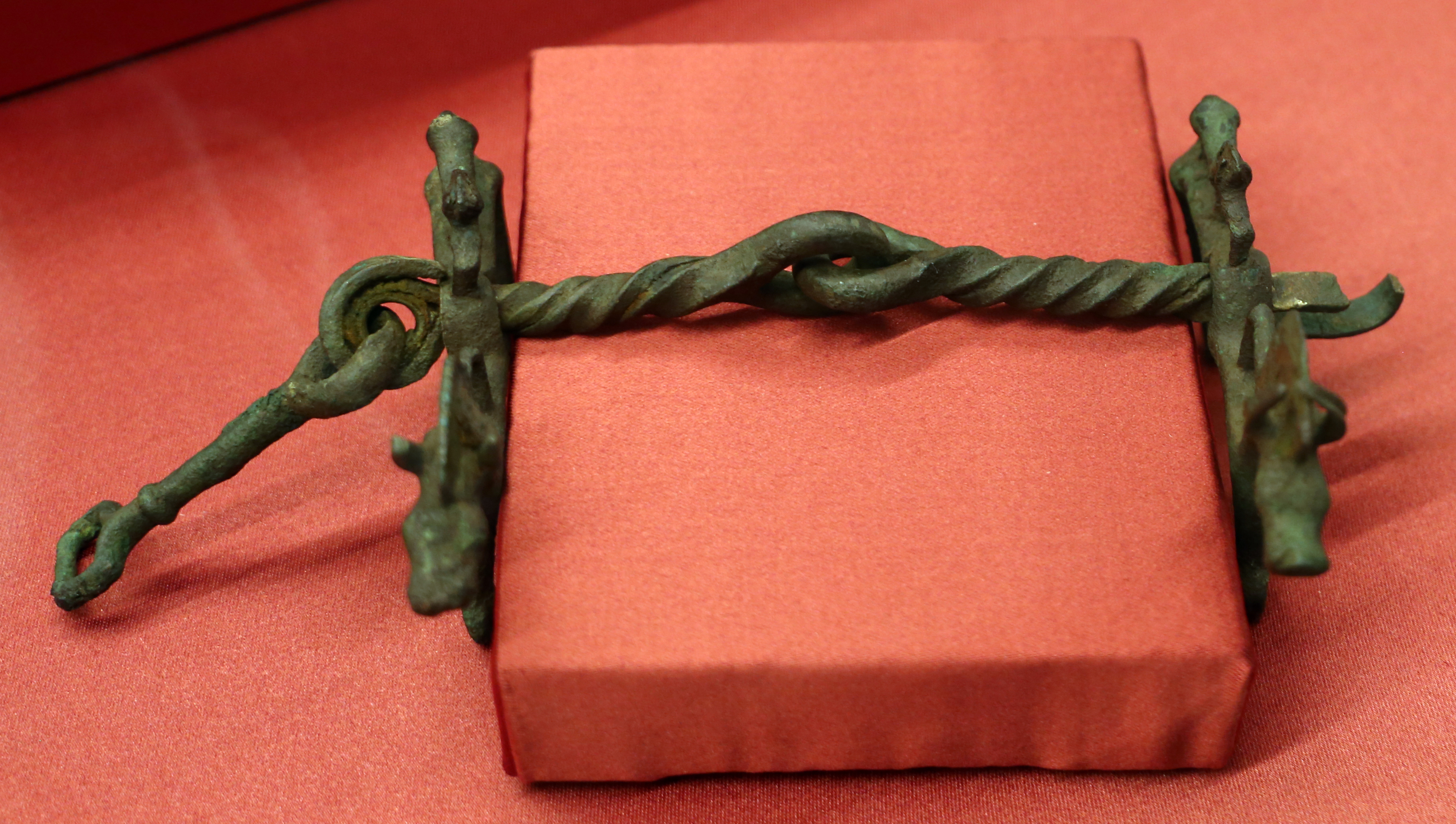

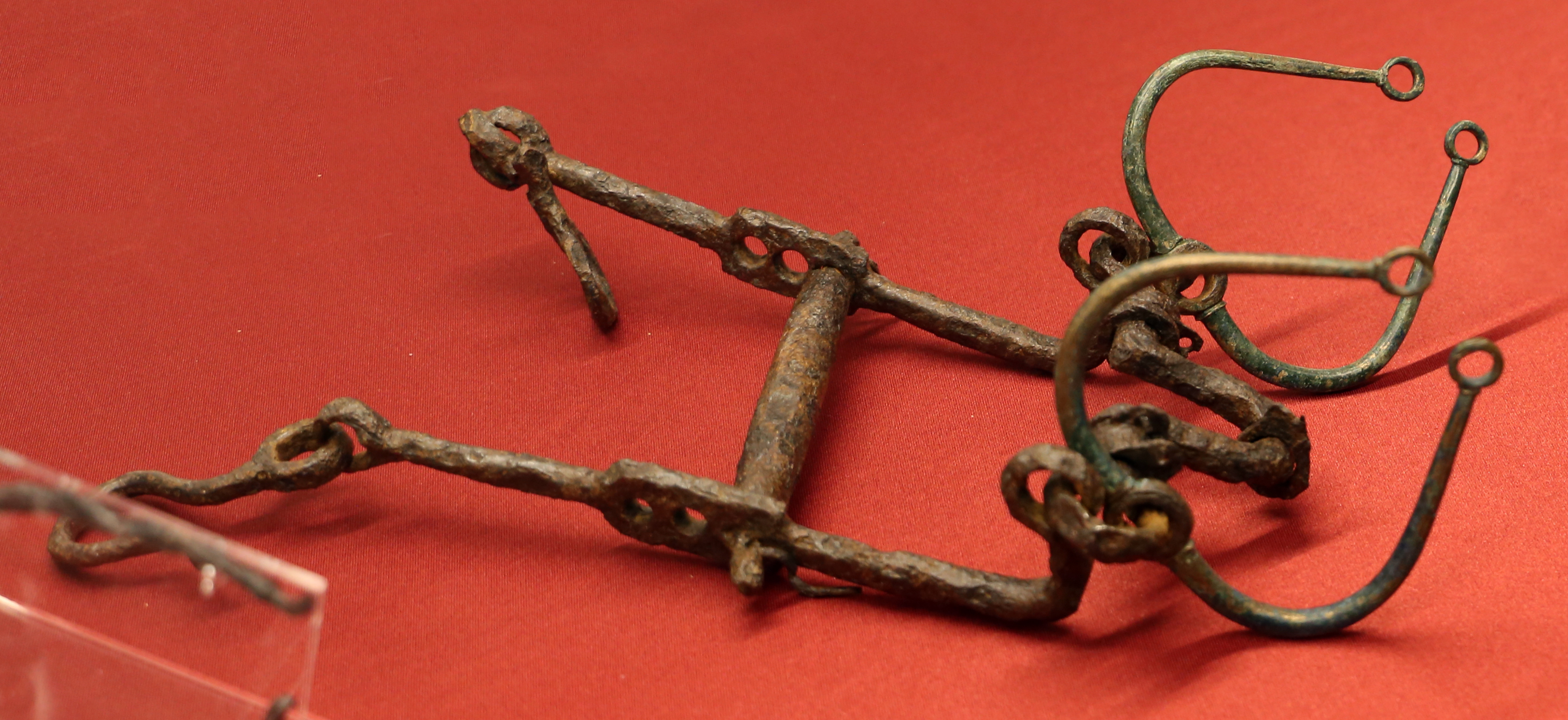

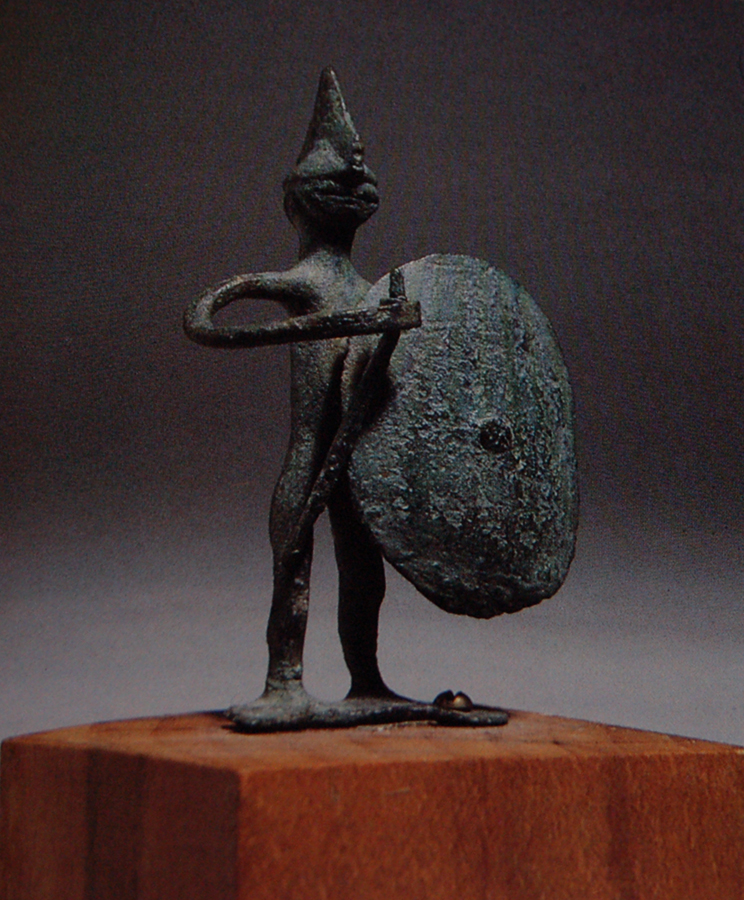

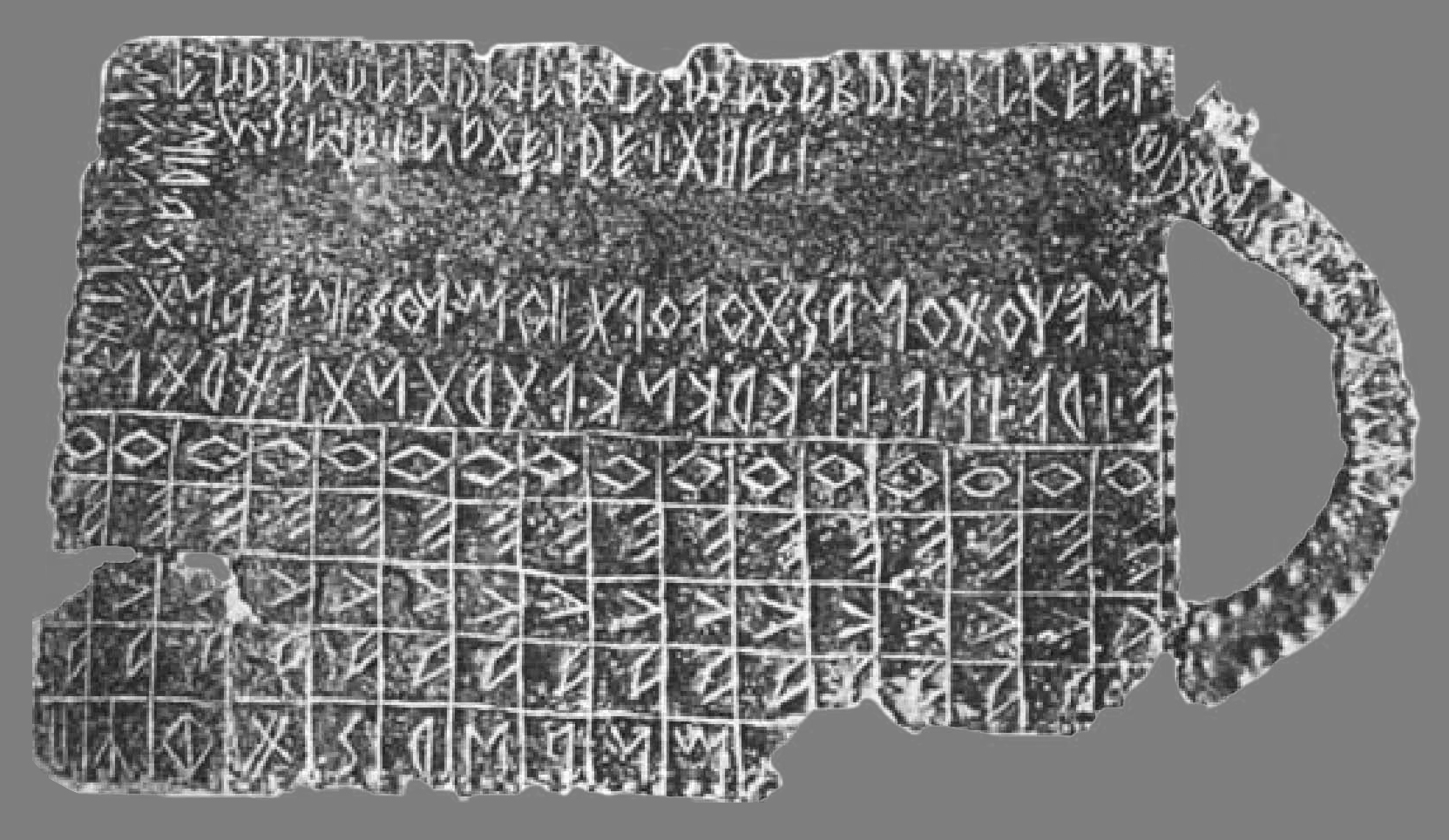
The Panel of Este, Venetic inscription, 6th century BC

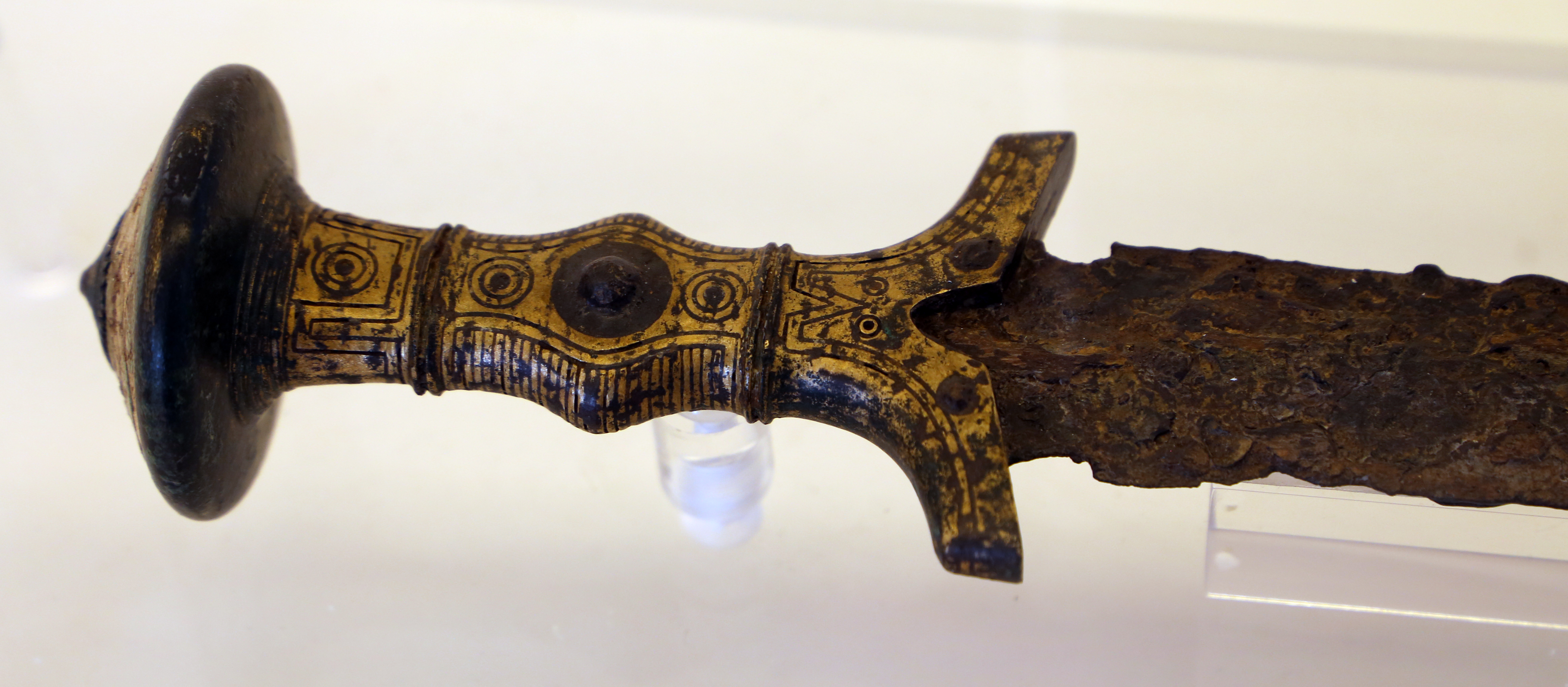
Decorated hilt of an iron sword from the elite tomb of Rivoli Veronese

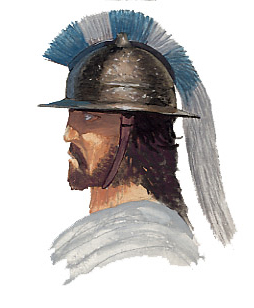

== Literature ==
- E. Di Filippo Balestrazzi. ‘Nuovi confronti iconografici e un'ipotesi sui rapporti fra l'area delle situle e il mondo orientale’, in Este e la civiltà paleoveneta a cento anni dalle prime scoperte: Atti del XI Convegno di studi etruschi e italici, Este – Padova 27 giugno – 1 luglio 1976. Ed. Giulia DeFogolari. Florence: L.S. Olschki, 1980, p. 153–70. (Italian)
- Raffaello Battaglia, ed. Dal paleolitico alla civiltà atestina: Storia di Venezia. Venice: Centro internazionale delle arti e del costume, 1958 – Vol.1, pp. 79–177 (Italian)
- Glyn Daniel & Joachim Rehork, eds. Lübbes Enzyklopädie der Archäologie [= Encyclopedia of Archaeology]. Bergisch Gladbach, Germany: Lübbe, 1977 (repr. 1980, 1996), ISBN 3-930656-37-X. (German)
- Otto-Herman Frey. Die Entstehung der Situlenkunst: Studien zur figürlich verzierten Toreutik von Este. Römisch-Germanische Forschungen, vol. 31. Berlin: Walter de Gruyter, 1969. (German)
- J. P. Mallory. ‘Este culture’, in Encyclopedia of Indo-European Culture. Eds. D. Q. Adams & J. P. Mallory. London/Chicago: Fitzroy Dearborn, 1997, p. 183–4
- G. Bermond Montanari. ‘Gli strumenti musicali nell'arte delle situle’, in Protostoria e storia del «Venetorum Angulus»: Portogruaro – Quarto d'Altino – Este – Adria, 16–19 ottobre 1996. Eds. Orazio Paoletti & Luisa Tamagno Perna. Pisa: Istituti editoriali e poligrafici internazionali, 1999, p. 487–99. (Italian)

== See also ==
- Adriatic Veneti
- Polada culture
- Euganei
- Canegrate culture
- Golasecca culture
- Prehistoric Italy
