= Japodian burial urns =

Archaeological finds in Una-Sana Canton, Bosnia

- Year: c. 5th century BC-Roman era
- Location: Historical Museum; Sarajevo

The Japodian burial urns are a series of fifteen burial urns made by the Illyrian tribe of the Japodes around the area of Bihać in Bosnia. These cremation urns where the cremated remains of the dead were placed in, were beautifully decorated with figurative designs of humans and animals. The Japodian burial urn art was a unique form of art influenced to a degree by the Situla art of northern Illyria and Italy and by Greek art. The urns represent one of the best Japodian figurative art forms.

The first urn was discovered in 1890 in the necropolis of Jezerina near Bihać. In this fragment the face of a warrior was presented with a helmet, a drinking horn on the right hand and with a spear on the left hand. Almost all of the scenes are linked with the cult of the dead. The urns are broken up in three phases, grouped up chronologically. The earliest date from the 5th century BC and even probably from the start of the 4th century BC and depict figures related with those of the situla art. The Japodian artists which created the early urns were inspired by the situla art and took many motives from this art, but which transformed the images in order to suit their own tastes. From this the second phase was created but with a much smaller yield. The second phase is linked with Greek art. The third group dates from the Roman era and presents a highly developed form of Japodian art.

== Sources ==
- Stipčević, Aleksandar (1977). The Illyrians: history and culture. Noyes Press. p. 203. ISBN 978-0-8155-5052-5.
