= Benvenuti Situla =

1st-century BC vessel discovered in Italy

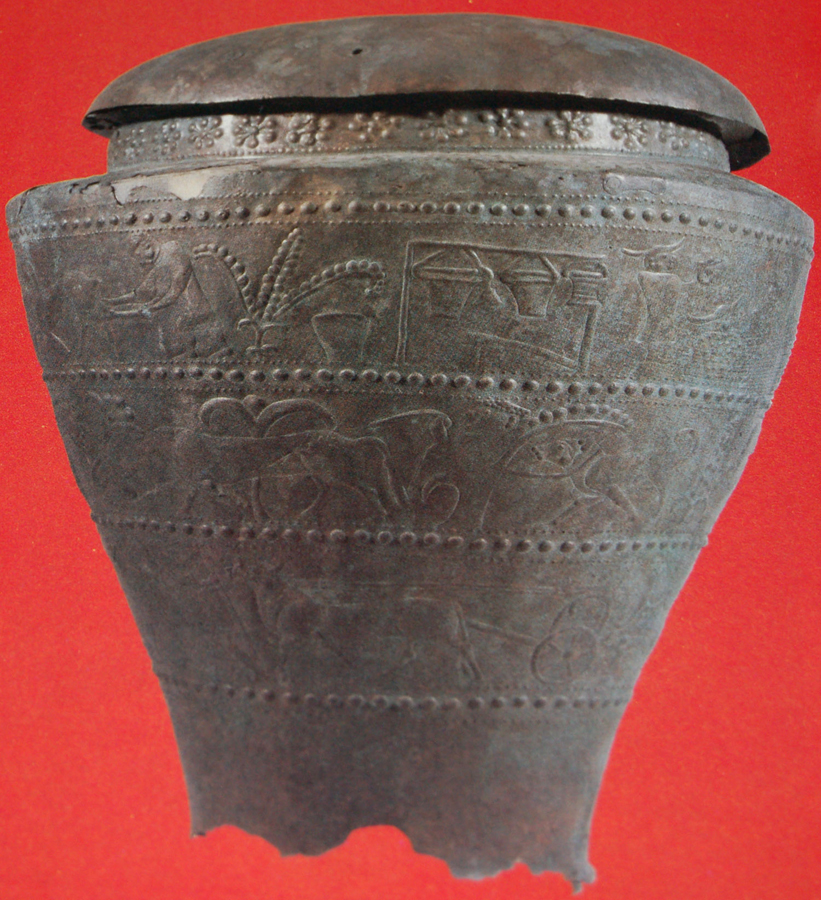
- Material: Bronze
- Height: 31.5 cm
- Width: 25.4 cm
- Created: c. 600 BC
- Discovered: before 1887; Este, Veneto, Italy
- Present location: Este, Veneto, Italy

The Benvenuti Situla is a bronze situla that dates to c. 600 BC and was discovered in Este, Veneto, Italy. It is a product of the situla art that spread north from the Etruscans in this period, in this case to the Este culture that flourished in Este during the 7th century BC. The vessel is now conserved in the local National Museum Atestino.

== Description ==
The relief work on the vessel depicts scenes of aristocratic life. These include banqueting as well as scenes of military victory. The iconography of the relief scenes of the situla may indicate Etruscan influence.

== See also ==
- Adriatic Veneti
- Polada culture
- Euganei
- Canegrate culture
- Golasecca culture
- Prehistoric Italy
