= Situla of the Pania =

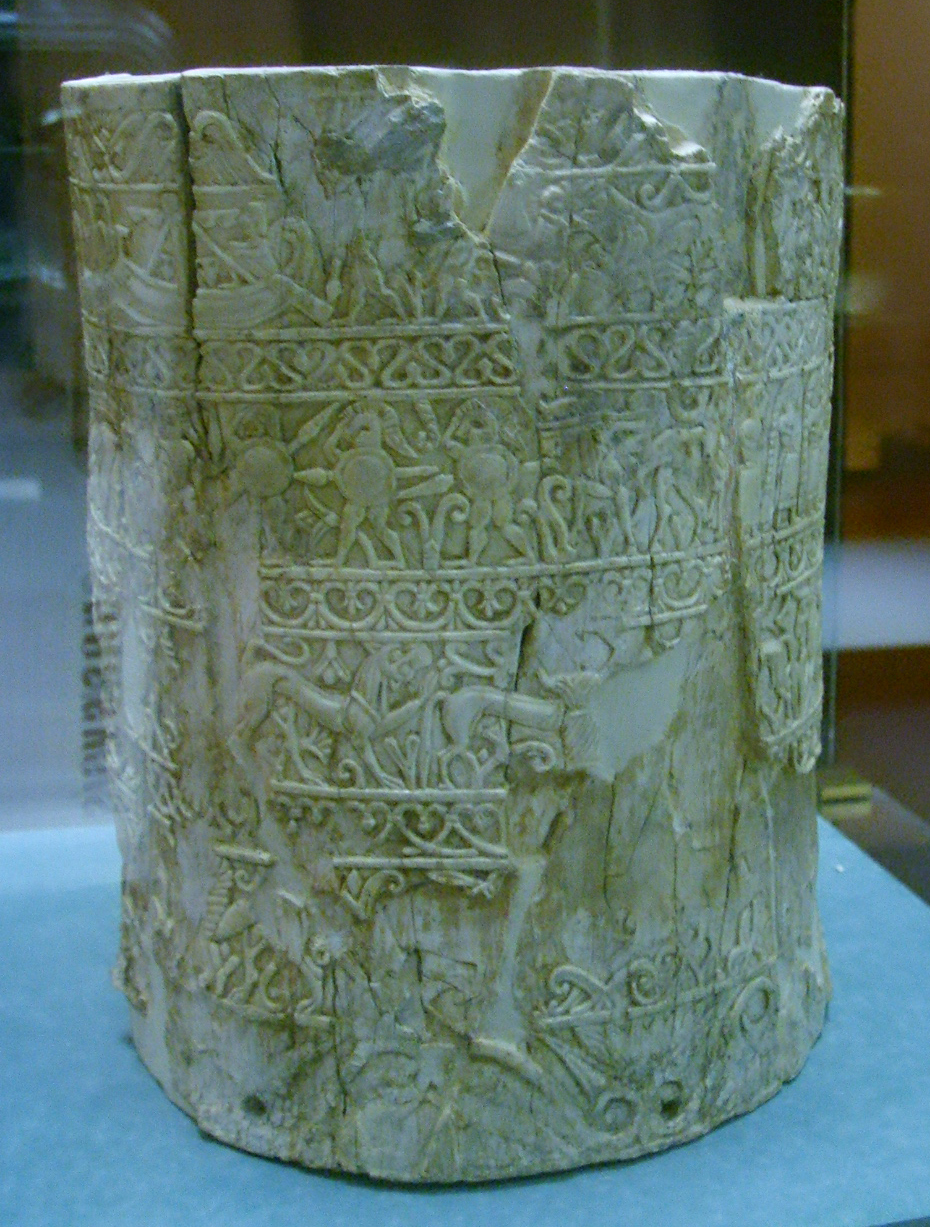
Situla of the Pania

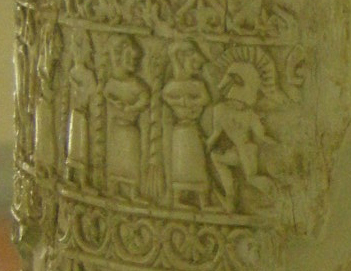
Detail of the second band

The Situla of the Pania is an ivory situla or pyxis from the end of the seventh century BC, found in the Tomb of the Pania in Chiusi and conserved in the Museo archeologico nazionale di Firenze.

The work is one of the most important examples of Etruscan ivory work - there are only two other examples, one from Chiusi and one from Cerveteri. It is composed of a hollow cylinder (22 cm high) and decorated with horizontal friezes, separated by small bands carved with plant motifs (interweaved palmettes and lotus flowers). Two medium-sized bands at the top and bottom are decorated with more lotus flowers.

The upper frieze shows two myths from the Odyssey, split by a sphinx: the encounter with Scylla (who looks a lot like a hydra) and the escape from the cyclops Polyphemus. The second frieze shows common motifs of departure for war, followed by hoplites performing a salute and weeping women (with long braids and their arms over their chests). After that there is a warrior without his shield performing a funerary dance and a horseman. The third band is decorated with beasts and monsters, employing eastern motifs. On the final band there are further imaginary animals.

The style of the situla is less monumental than ivories of the previous period, but more lively.

== Bibliography ==
- Ranuccio Bianchi Bandinelli & Mario Torelli, L'arte dell'antichità classica, Etruria-Roma, Utet, Torino 1976.
