= Situla =

Bucket shaped container found in archaeological sites

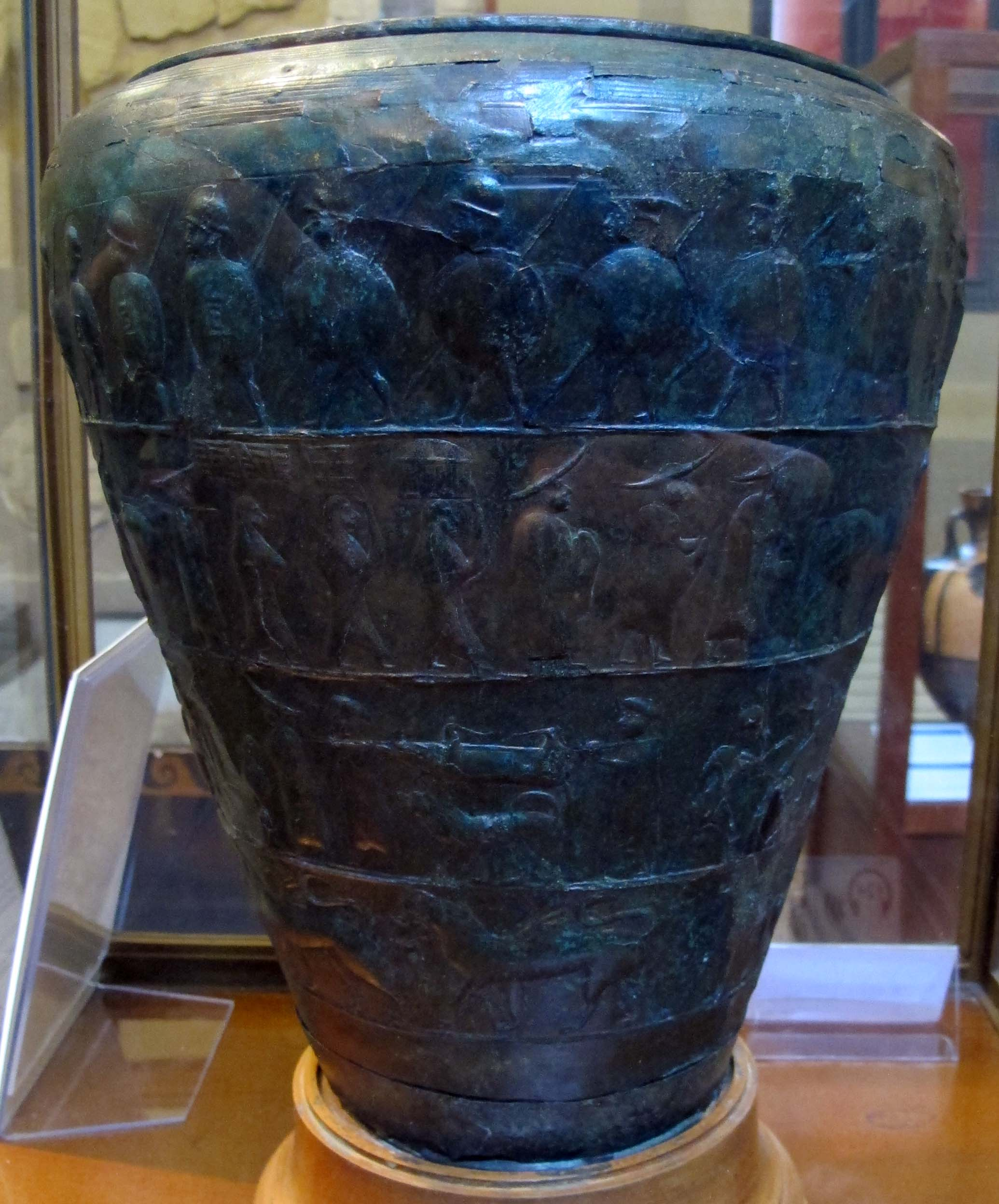
Etruscan situla, 600–550 BC, tomb 68 at the Certosa necropolis

Situla (plural situlae), from the Latin word for bucket or pail, is the term in archaeology and art history for a variety of elaborate bucket-shaped vessels from the Bronze Age to the Middle Ages, usually with a handle at the top. All types may be highly decorated, most characteristically with reliefs in bands or friezes running round the vessel.

Decorated Iron Age situlae in bronze are a distinctive feature of Etruscan art in burials from the northern part of the Etruscan regions, from which the style spread north to some cultures in Northern Italy, Slovenia, and adjacent areas, where terms such as situla culture and situla art may be used.

Situla is also the term for types of bucket-shaped Ancient Greek vases, some very finely painted. More utilitarian pottery situlae are also found, and some in silver or other materials, such as two glass ones from late antiquity in St Mark's, Venice. Ancient Egyptian and Near Eastern shapes tend to have a pointed bottom, so that they must rest on a stand or on their side. The practical wider shape is a European invention, first seen in the European Bronze Age.

== Bronze Age Europe ==
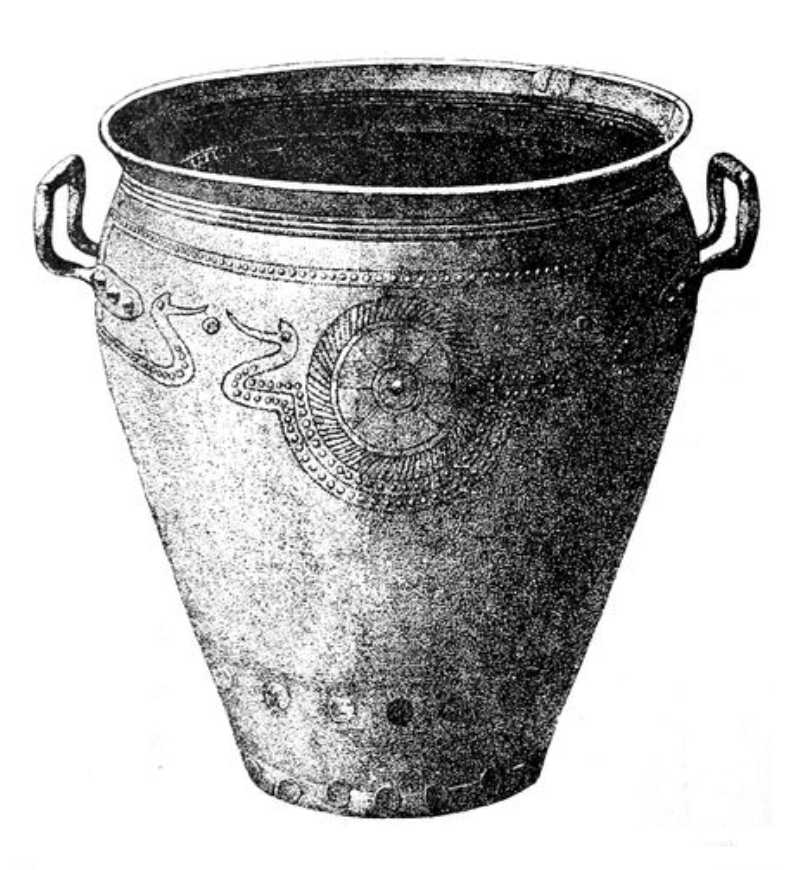
Urnfield culture, bronze situla with bird-headed sun ship motif, Hungary, c. 1000 BC.

Bronze situlae were a feature of the Urnfield culture which dominated central Europe and parts of southern Europe in the Late Bronze Age. They frequently incorporated schematic depictions of solar boats with bird head protomes, known as the 'sun-bird-ship' motif.

== Iron Age Europe ==
Typical Iron Age situlae are bronze, as in the types of libation vessels found as grave goods in Etruscan graves, the Este culture (example, the Situla Benvenuti) and neighbouring Golasecca culture, and the eastern zone of the Hallstatt culture of Central and Southeast Europe. Here they have a distinctive style, often without a handle; the Vače situla is a Slovenian example. These usually have sides sloping outwards, then a sharp turn in at the shoulder, and outside Etruria often a short narrower neck. The shape has similarities with the narrower spouted Etruscan shape of flagon that was also copied to the north, as in the 5th-century Basse Yutz Flagons found in France. They are often decorated, in the most elaborate examples with several bands of figures running round the vessel. They may or may not have handles, and sometimes have lids. Many are made of several sheets held together with rivets.

The Etruscan examples are most characteristic in the 7th century BC, though continuing well afterwards. They are in various materials, from pottery to bronze, and sometimes silver. The Situla of the Pania is an unusual luxury Etruscan example in ivory, and the Bocchoris vase a ceramic import from Egypt from an Etruscan burial. The Este and Hallstatt examples are later, with the Slovenian production reaching a peak in quality in the 5th century, up to about 400 BC, well after the Hallstatt period had ended over much of its area. Some were found containing cremated ashes, but they were essentially luxury vessels used at feasts.

Numerous Hallstatt situlae were found in Slovenia, mainly (19 of them) in the area of Novo Mesto in Lower Carniola, which has been named the "City of Situlae" due to this. Japodian burial urns made by the Japodes tribe of Illyrians are a 5th-century BC extension into modern Bosnia of this style.

Later Etruscan and then Roman styles favoured a simple shape curving from the base, becoming vertical at the top, with a wide mouth and no shoulder, but sometimes a projecting rim. These had a variety of uses, including for washing and bathing. Any decoration was often concentrated on the upper part of the sides.

=== Situla art ===
Situla art was an important means of transition of Greek-derived motifs from the Etruscans through the regions to the north to the emerging La Tène culture further west. According to Ruth Megaw and Vincent Megaw, "Situla art depicts life as seen from a masculine viewpoint, in which women are servants or sex objects; most of the scenes which include humans are of the feasts in which the situlae themselves figure, of the hunt or of war". Similar scenes are found on other vessel shapes, as well as bronze belt-plaques. The processions of animals, typical of earlier examples, or humans derive from the Near East and Mediterranean, and Nancy Sandars finds the style shows "a gaucherie that betrays the artist working in a way that is uncongenial, too much at variance with the temper of the craftsmen and the craft". Compared to earlier styles that arose organically in Europe "situla art is weak and sometimes quaint", and "in essence not of Europe".

Except for the Benvenuti Situla, men are hairless, with "funny hats, dumpy bodies and big heads", though often shown looking cheerful in an engaging way. The Benevenuti Situla is also unusual in that it seems to show a specific story.

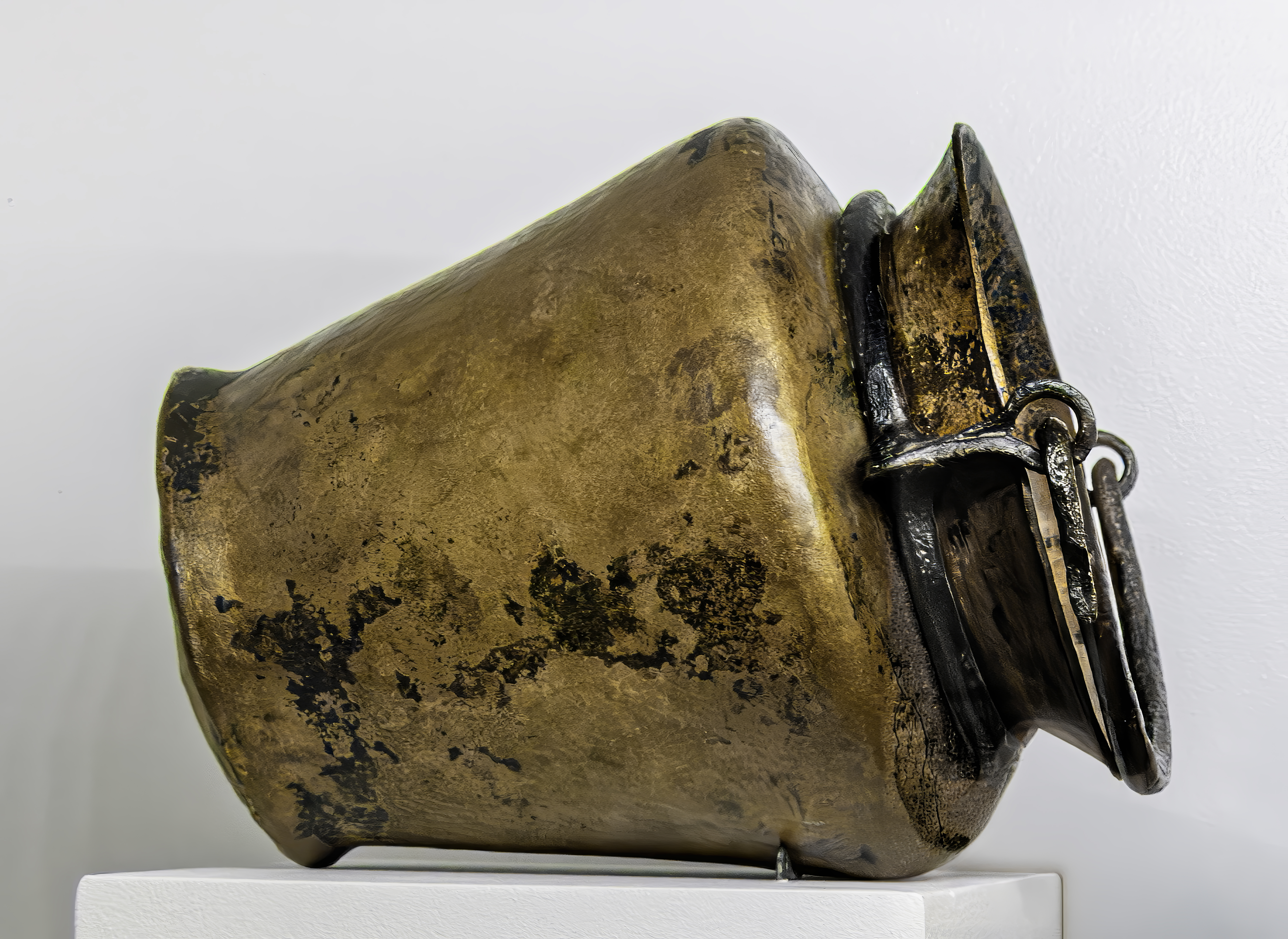
Bronze situla, first century BC - Musée Saint-Raymond Toulouse

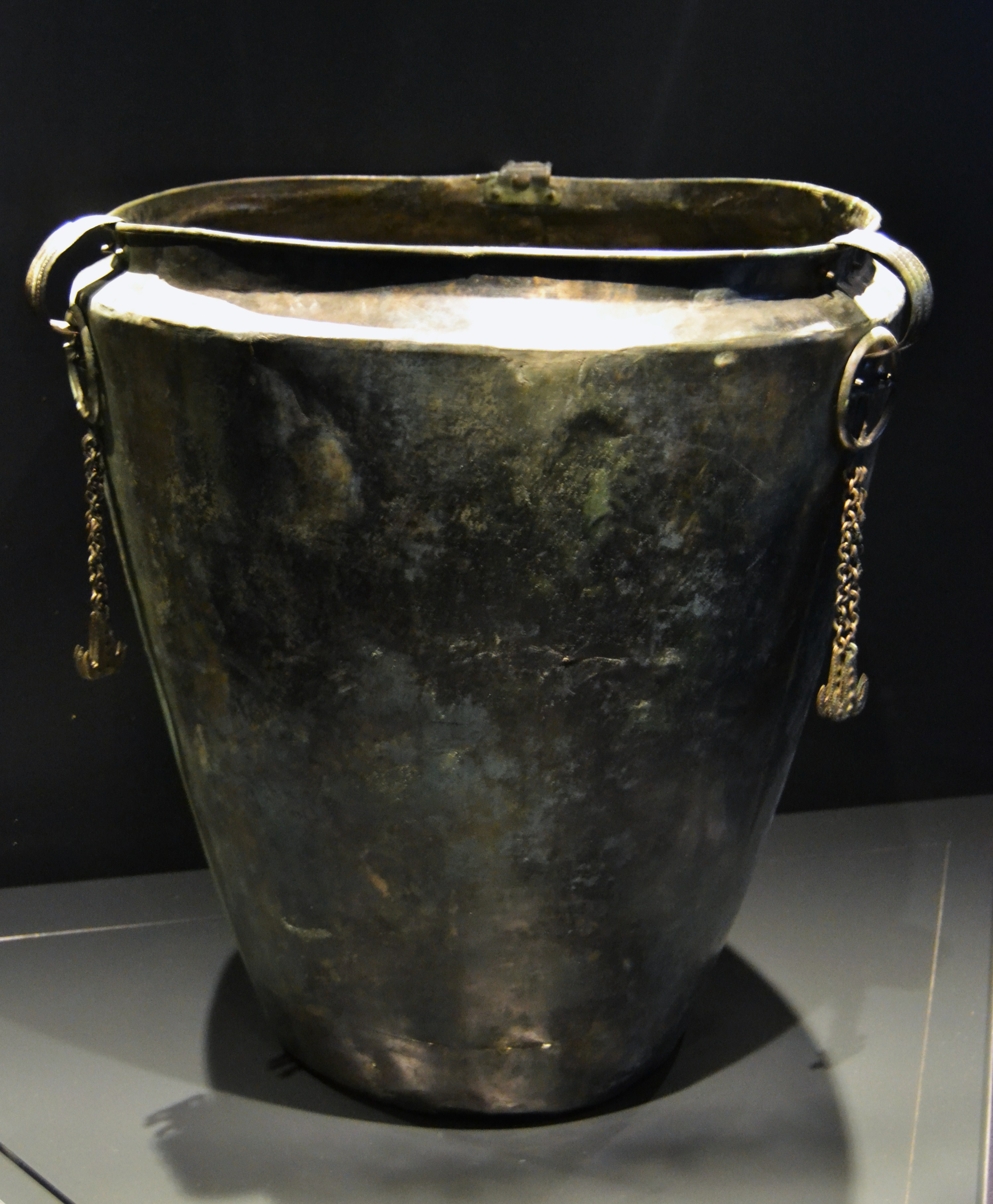
Bronze situla from Hallstatt, 800–750 BC

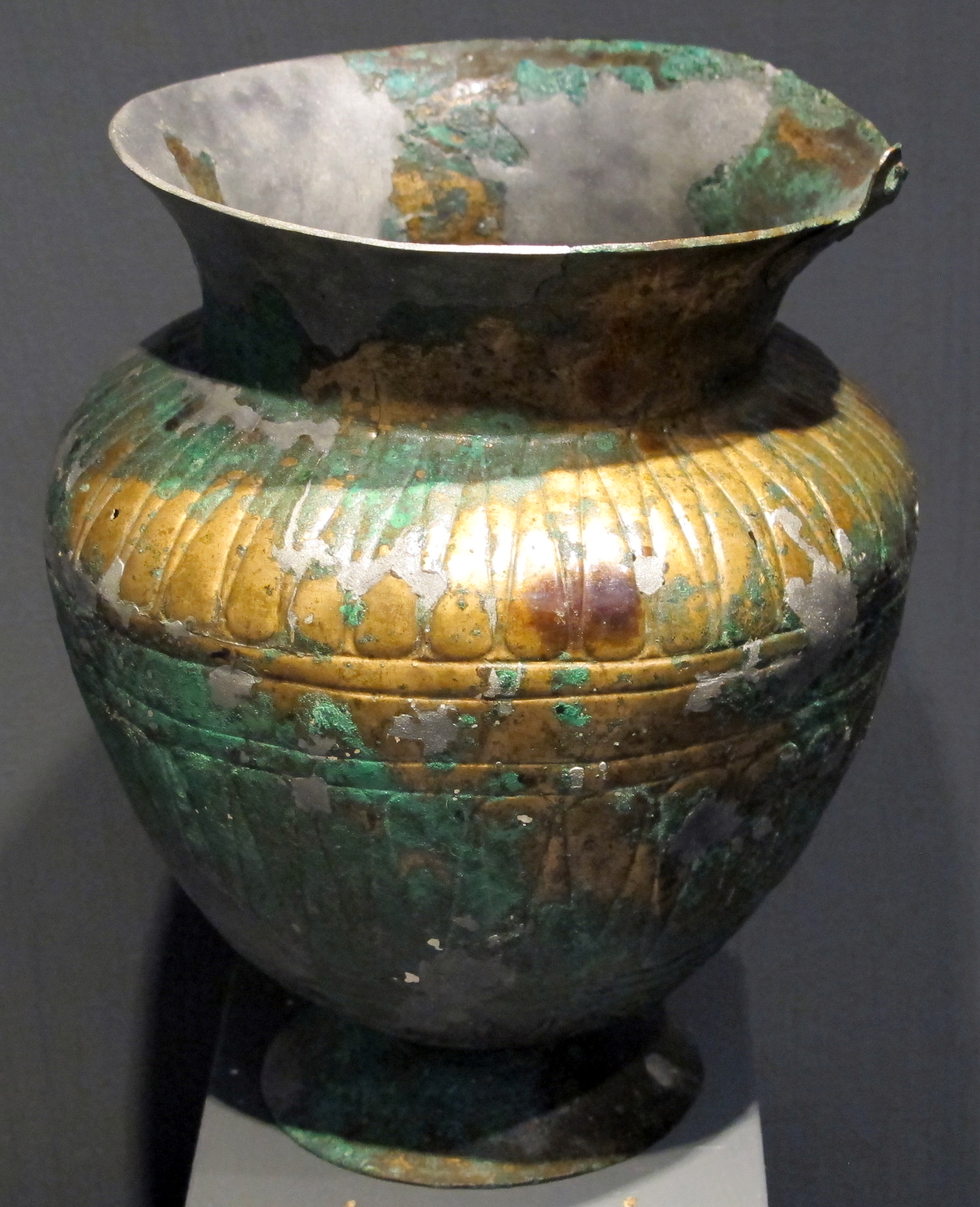
Etruscan with geometric ornament, 700–550 BC

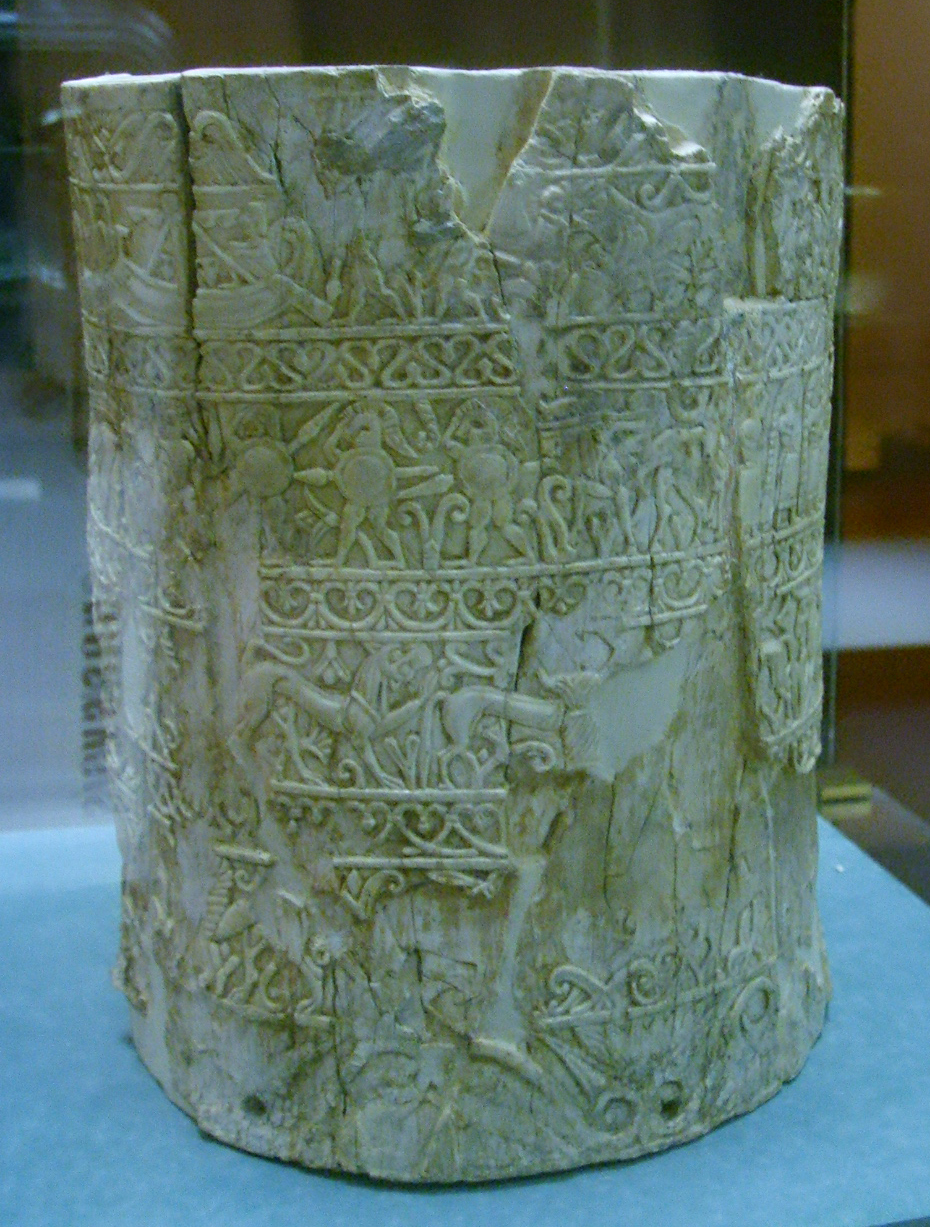
Etruscan "Situla della Pania", 7th century BC

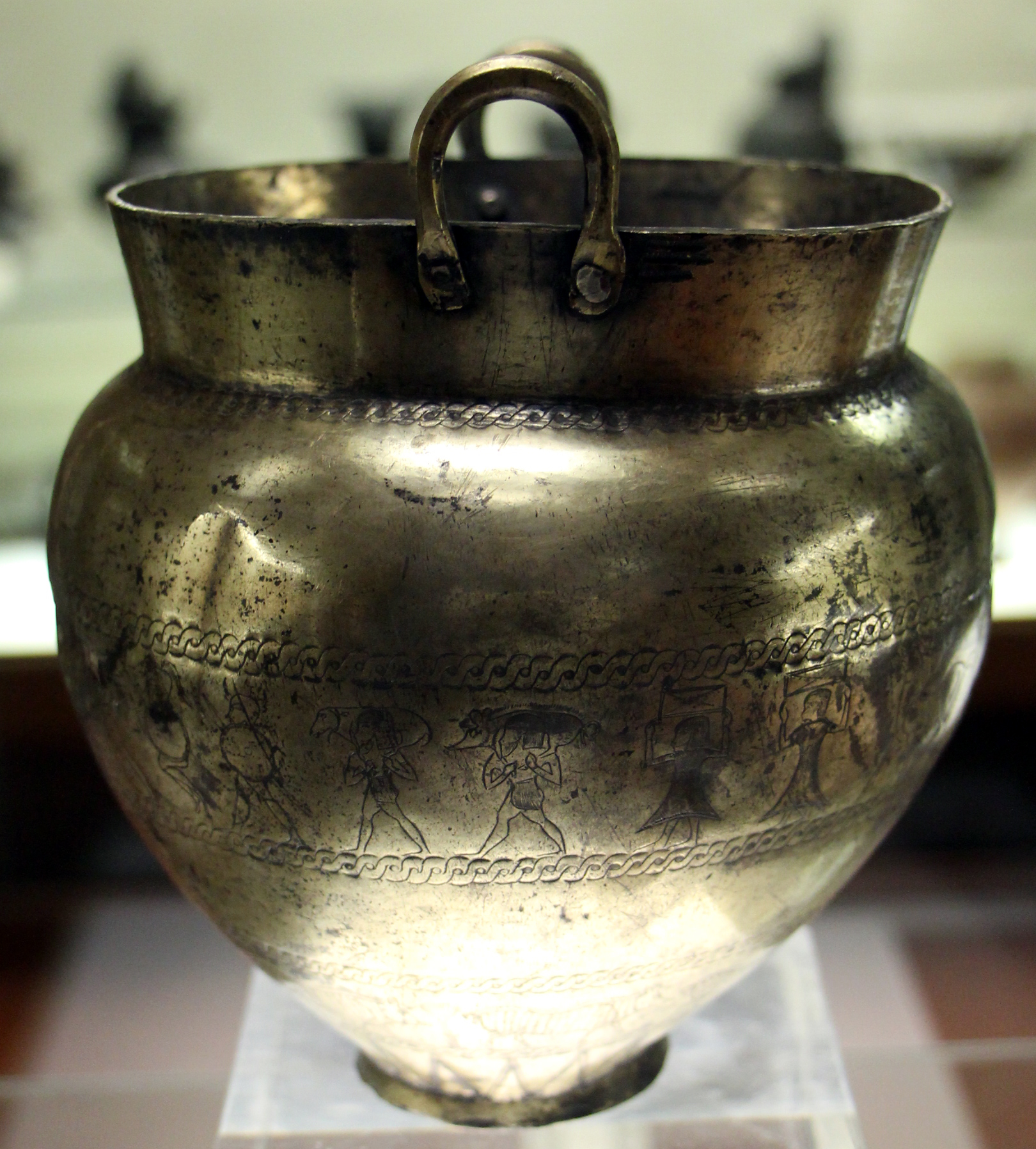
Etruscan, silver, Chiusi, c. 650 BC

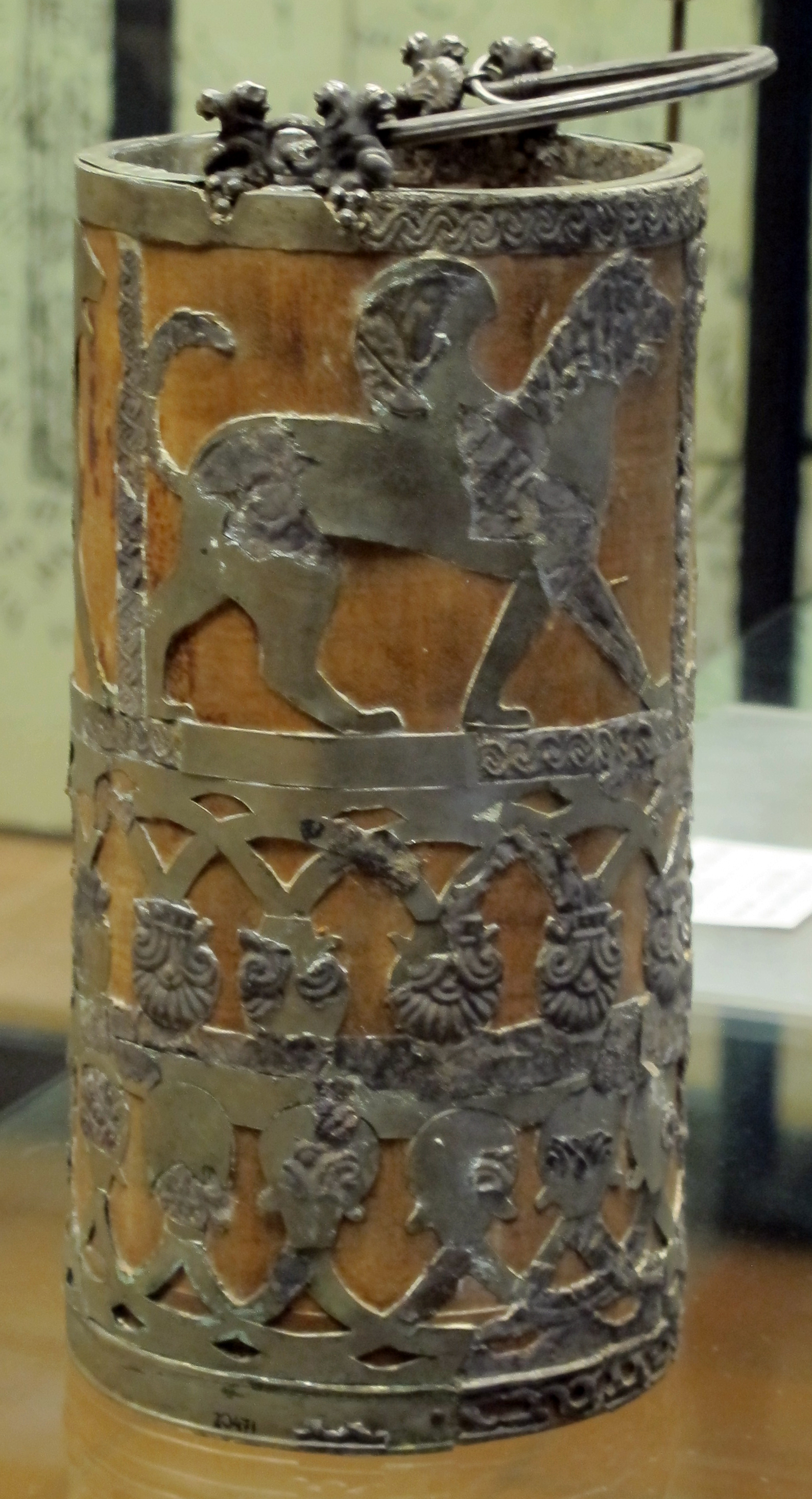
Etruscan, with silver mounts, Cerveteri c. 650 BC

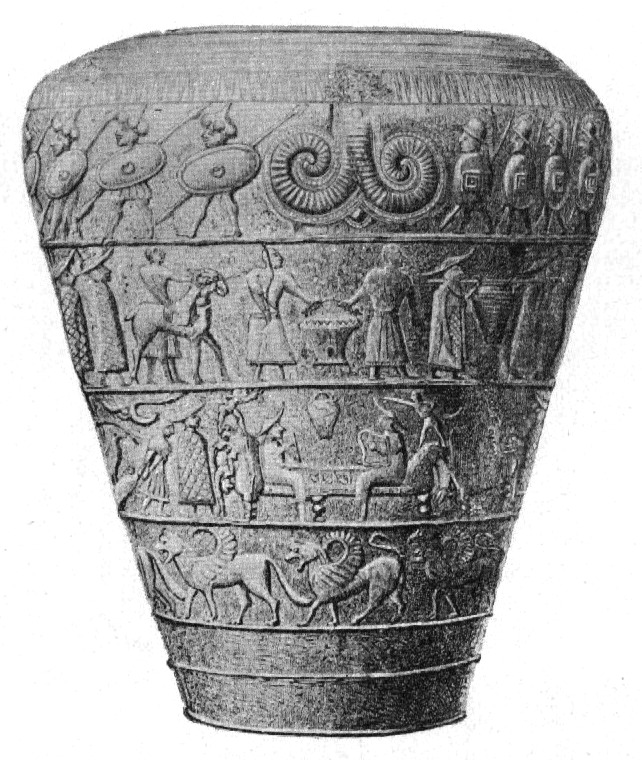
Clearer reproduction of the Etruscan bronze situla at the top of the page.

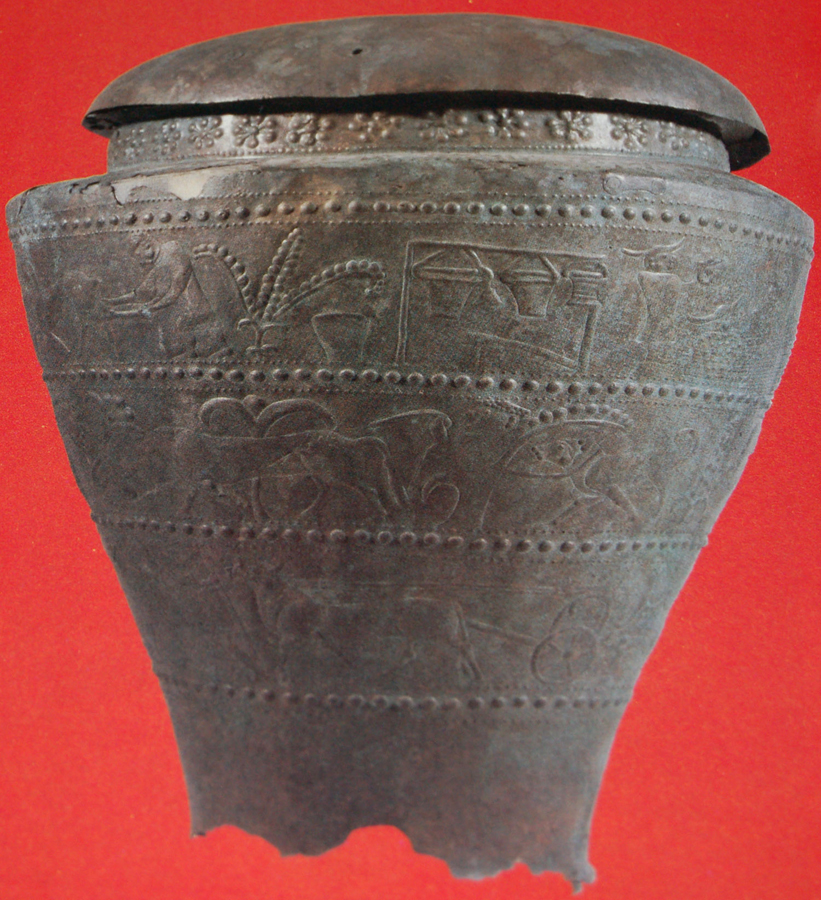
Situla Benvenuti, Este culture, c. 600 BC

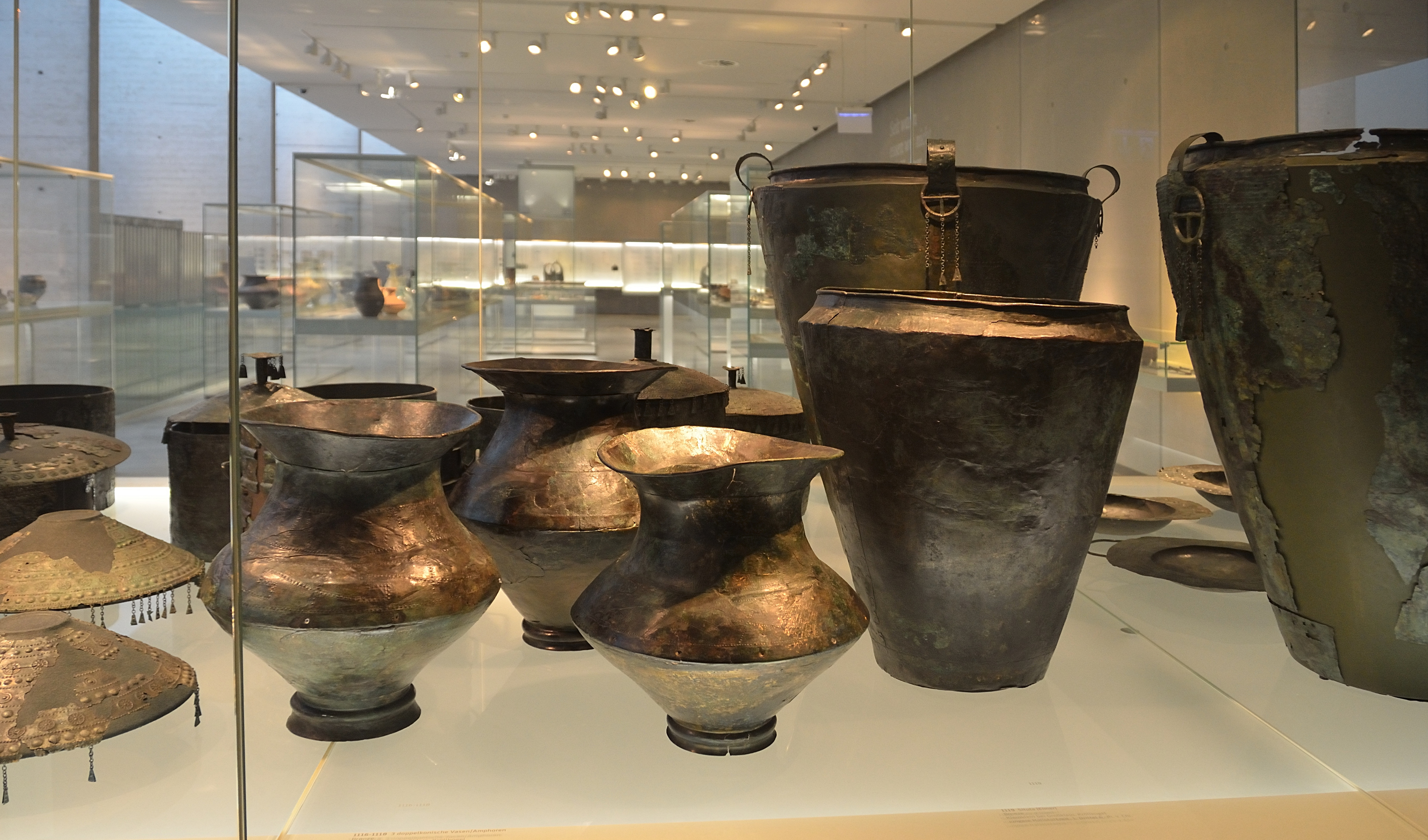
Bronze vases & situlae, Eastern zone of Hallstatt culture D, Kleinklein

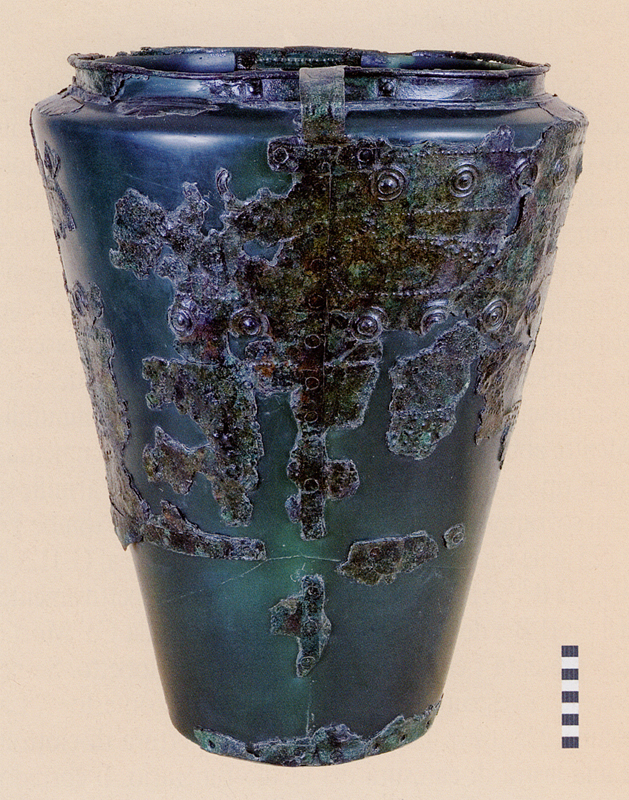
Golasecca culture II A, turn of the 7/6th century BC

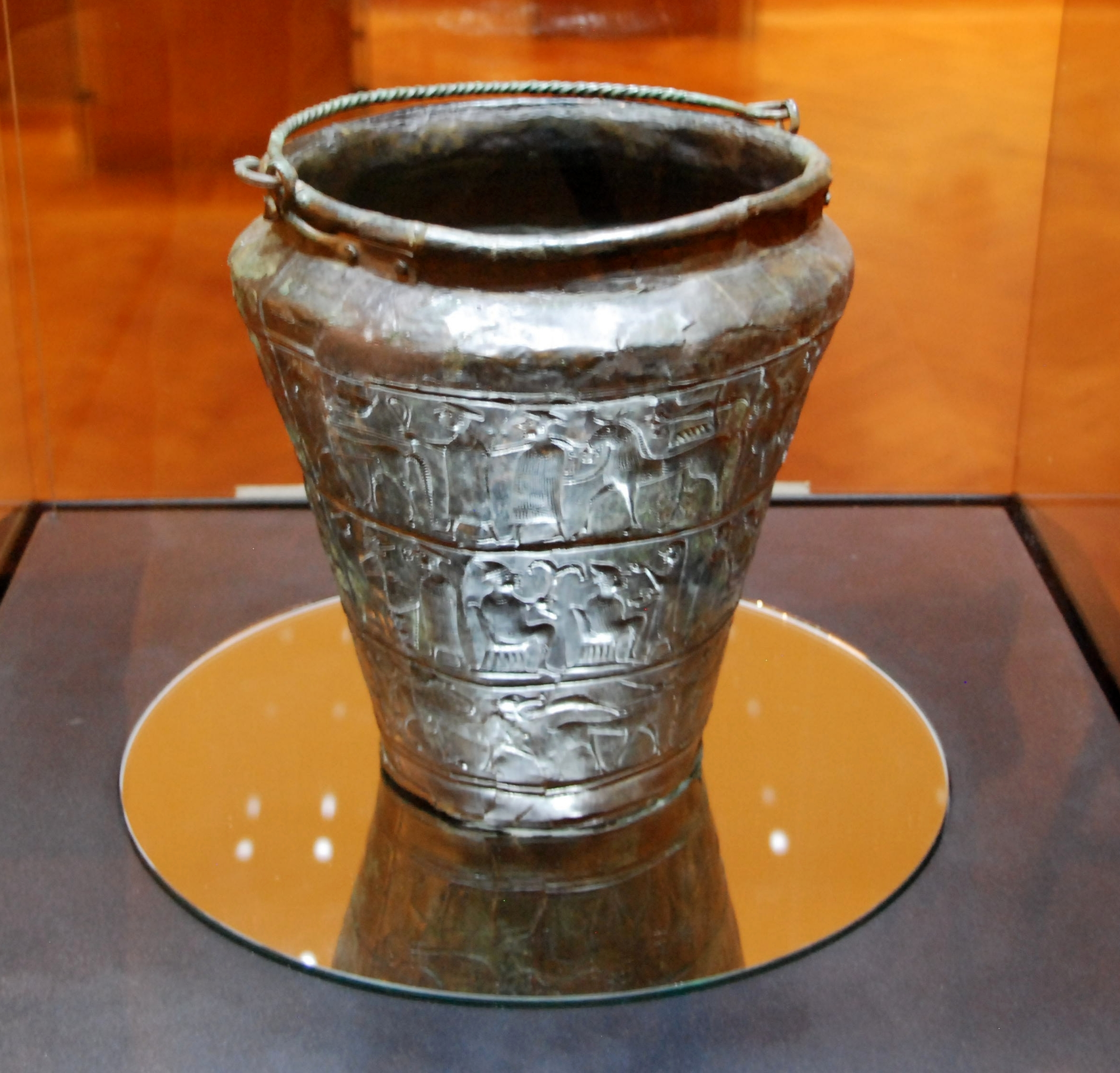
The Vače situla, Slovenia, 5th century BC

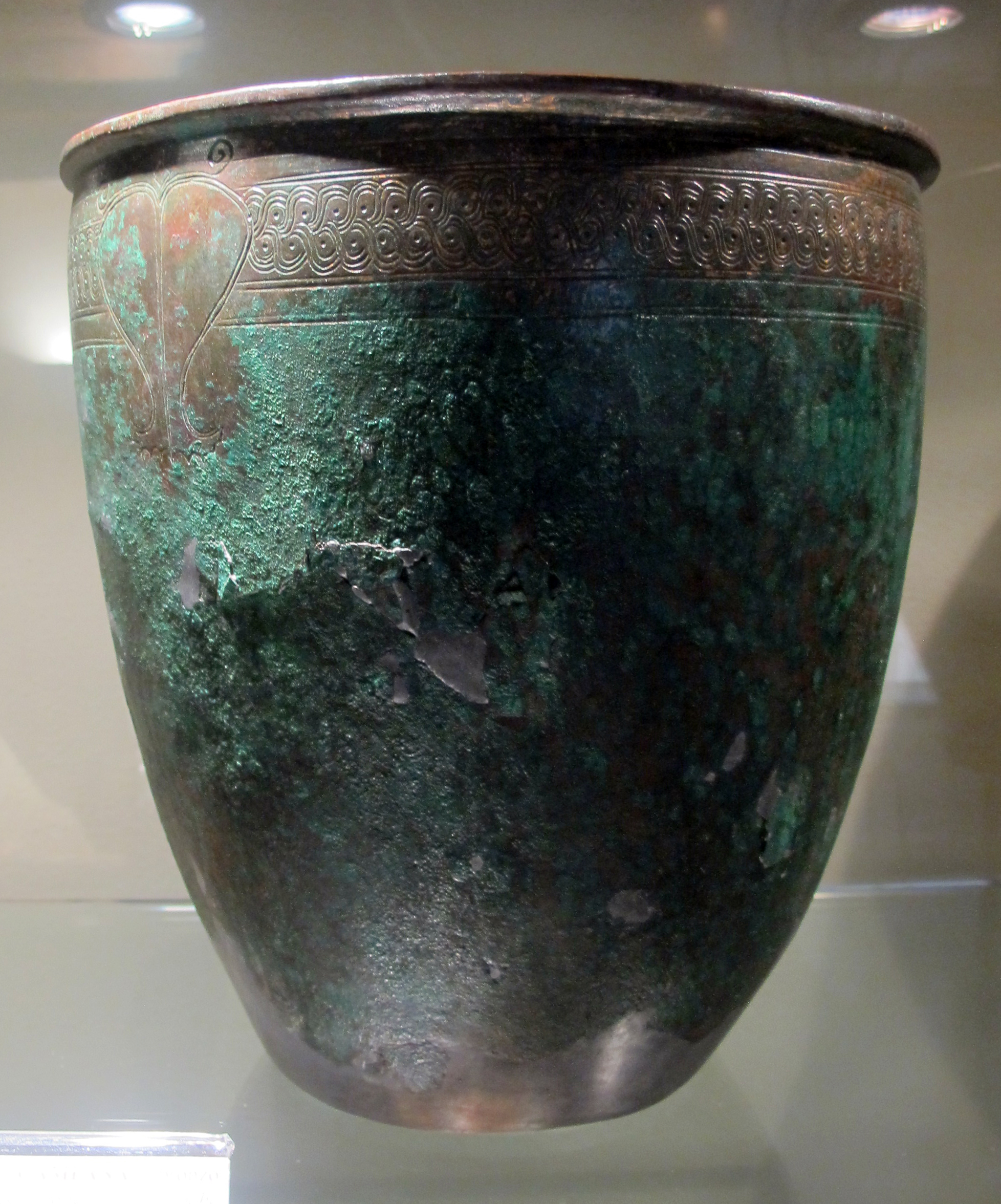
Late Etruscan, 3rd century BC, bronze

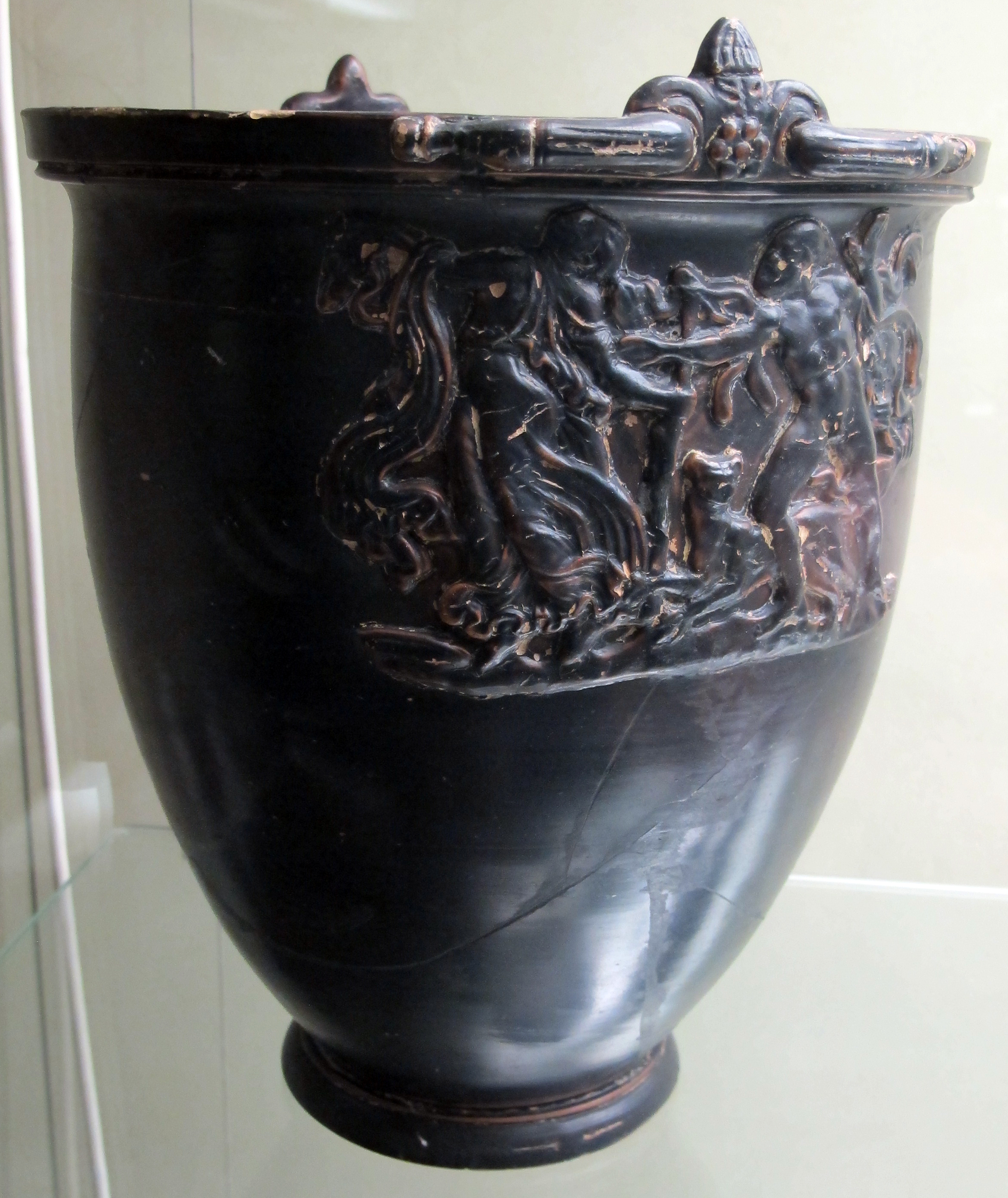
Late Etruscan, c. 300 BC, pottery

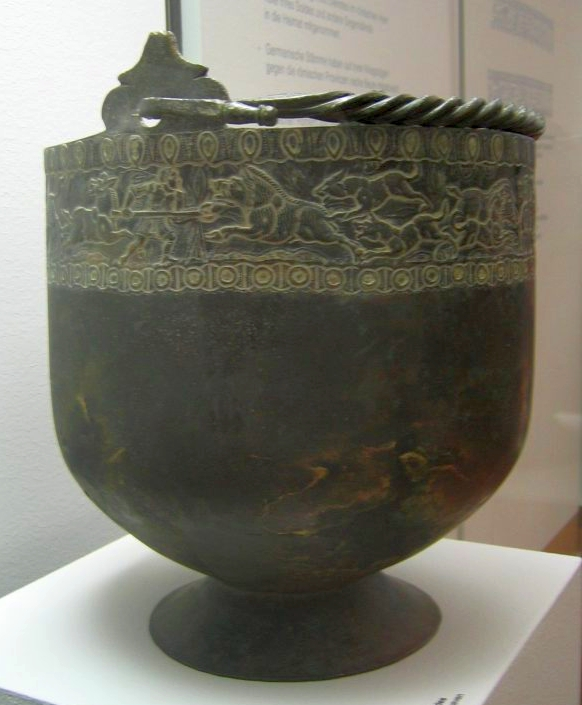
Roman bronze situla from Germany, 2nd–3rd centuries

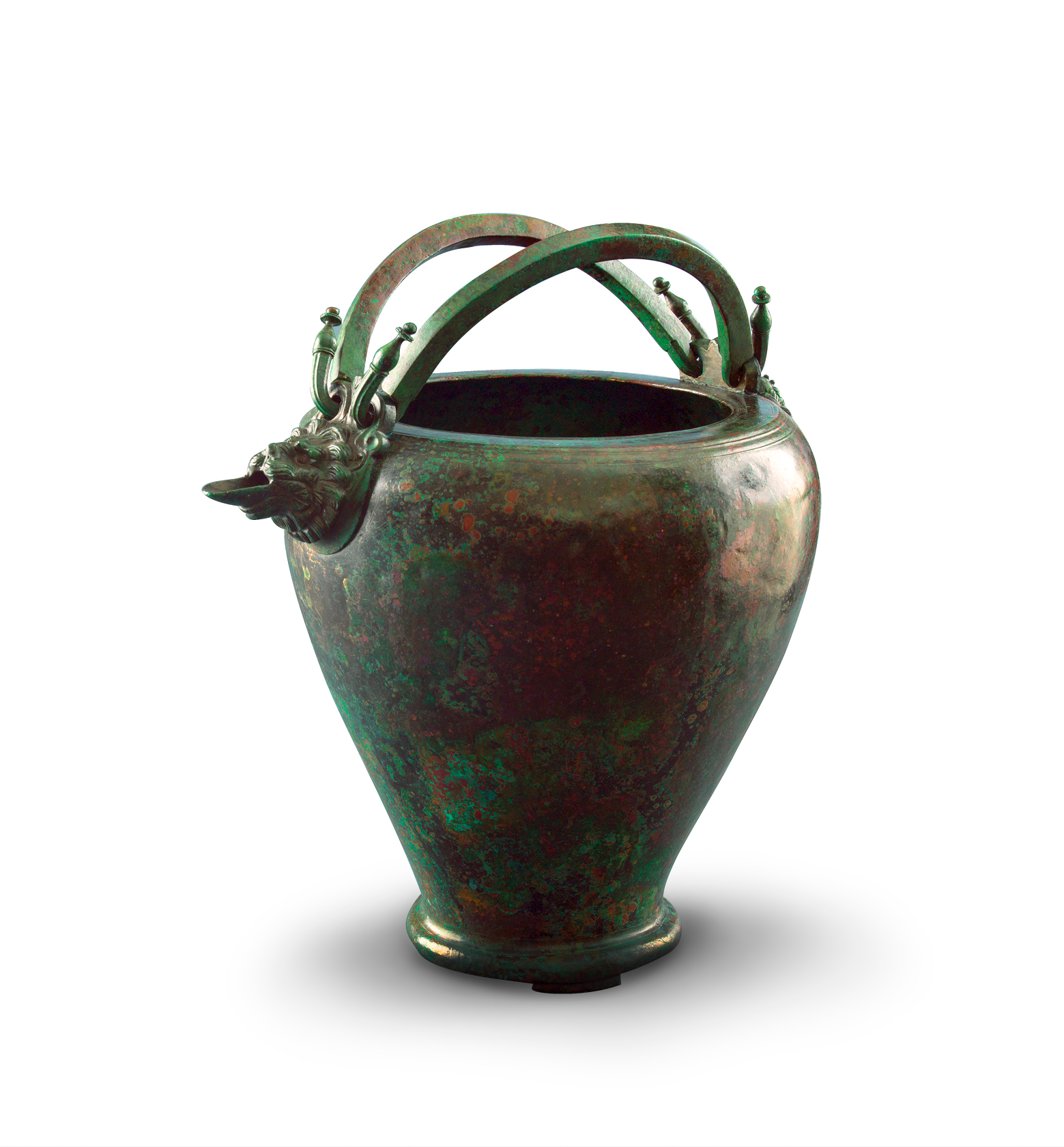
Bronze stamnoid situla, c. 340–320 BC, Sofia, Bulgaria

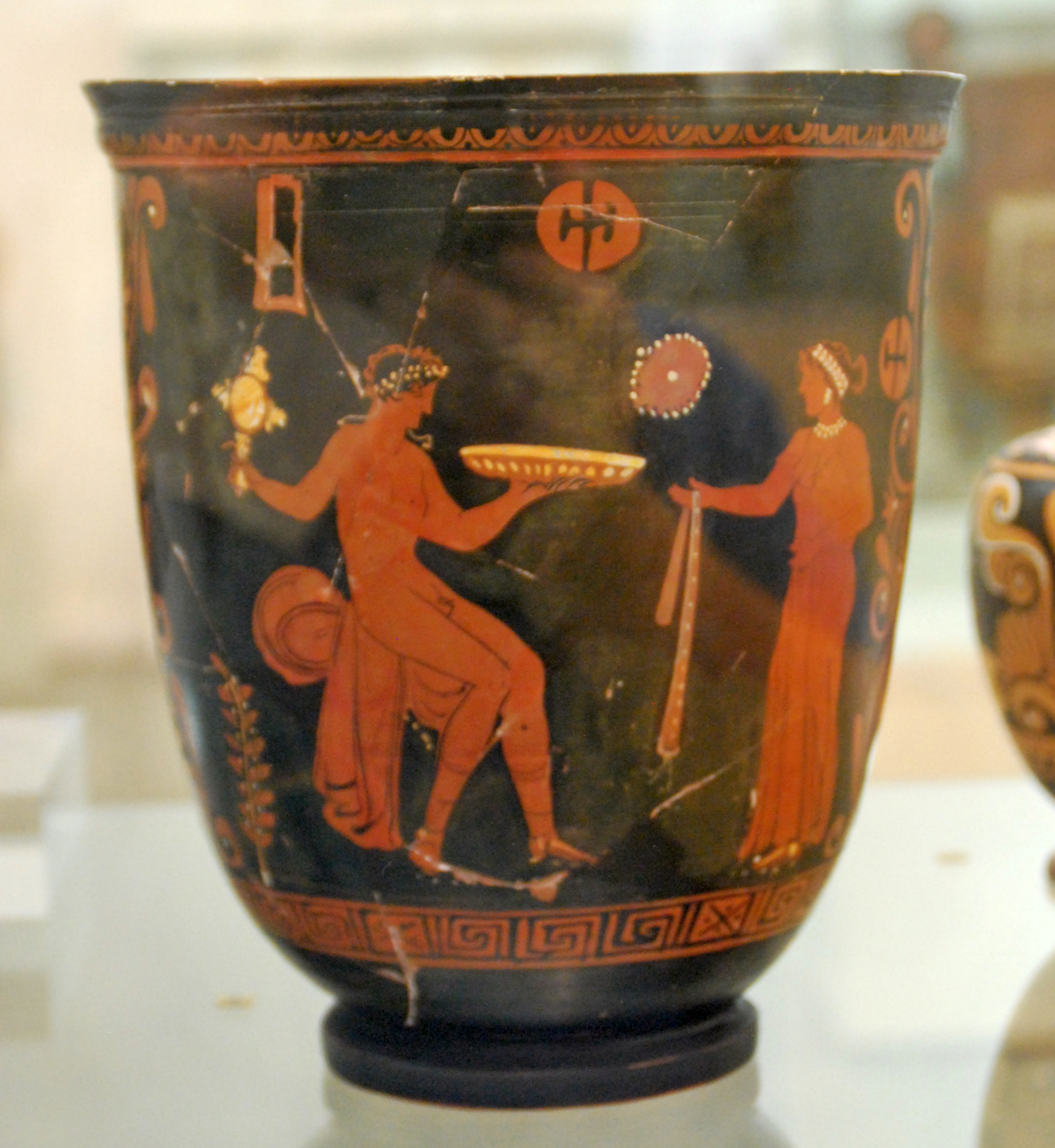
Ancient Greek (Apulian) pottery situla vase, 340-320 BC

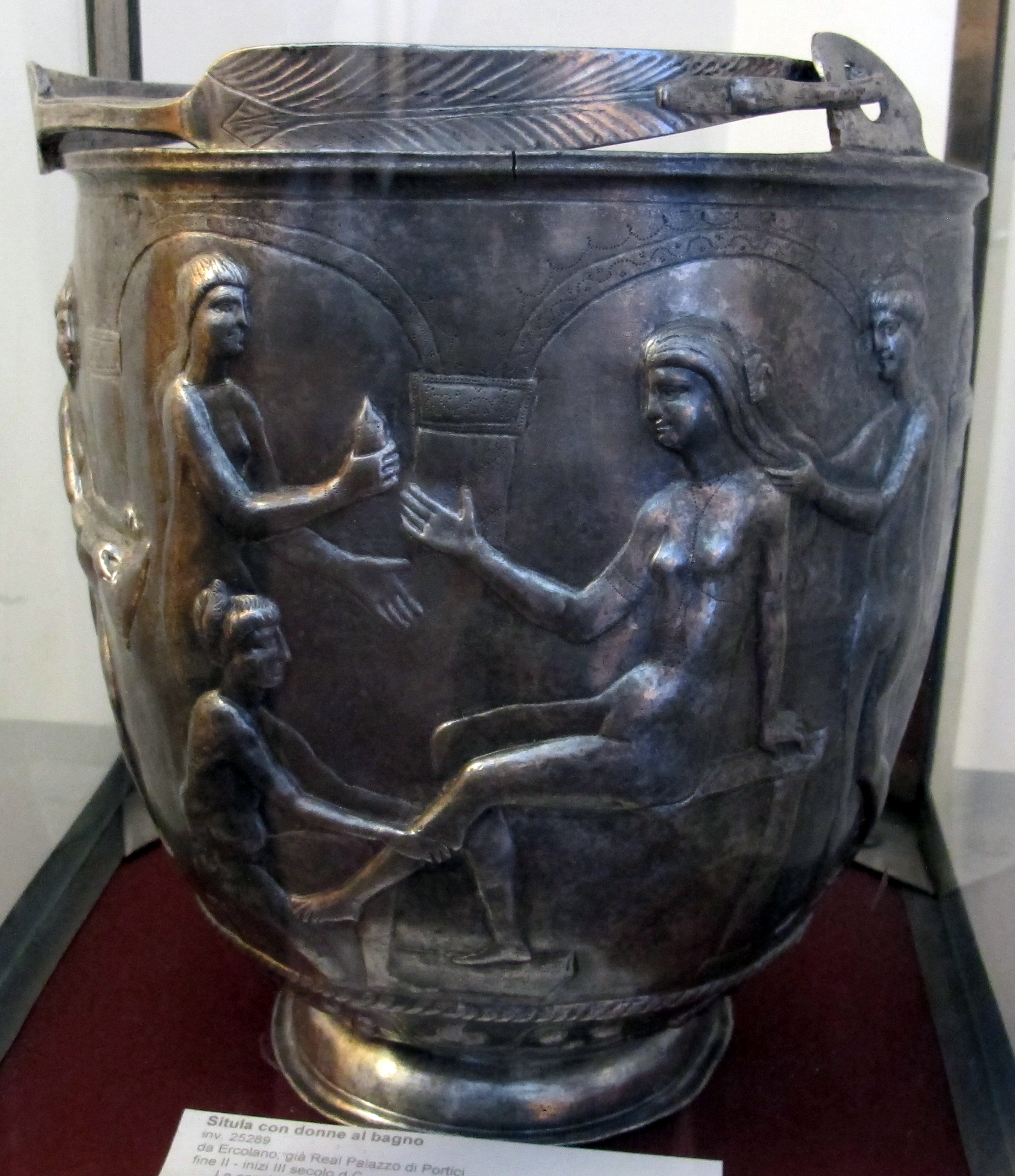
Roman silver situla with lady (or Venus) bathing, 190–210 AD

== Attribute of Isis ==
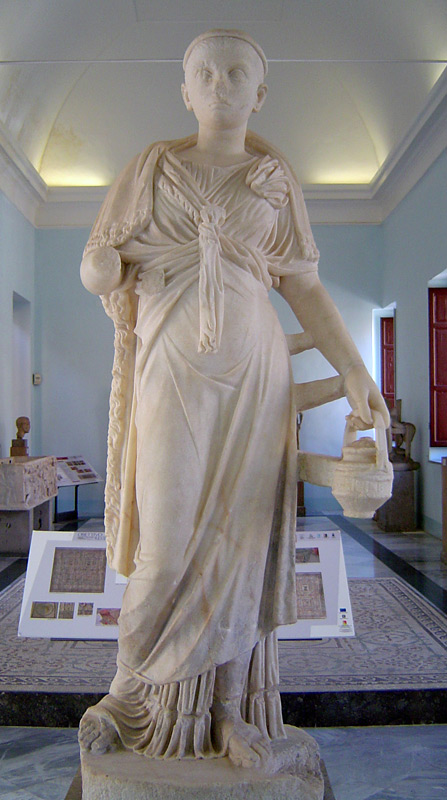
Priestess of Isis carrying situla, Roman statue, 2nd century BC

The term is also used for pails carried by figures in other art forms; according to Plutarch and other sources this was a sign of a devotee of Isis, who herself is often shown carrying one (containing water from the sacred Nile), of a rather different shape, with a rounded bottom, and sometimes lidded. This rounded shape, often with a "nipple" at the bottom (see Luristan example in § Gallery, below), is believed to have represented the female breast. These were also donated to temples as votive offerings by devotees.

== Christian situlae ==
Elaborate early medieval situlae, sometimes called aspersoria (singular: aspersorium), were Christian liturgical objects used to hold holy water, also usually of bronze, and straight-sided with a handle. An aspergillum was dipped in the situla to collect water with which to sprinkle the congregation or other objects.

Four richly carved ivory examples from the 10th century are known: the Basilewsky Situla of 920 in the Victoria & Albert Museum, decorated with twelve scenes from the life of Christ on two levels (it contains one of the very few depictions of Judas Iscariot showing remorse and throwing the thirty silver coins on the floor of the Temple), the "Situla of Gotofredo" of c. 980 in Milan Cathedral, one in the Aachen Cathedral Treasury, and one in the Metropolitan Museum of Art in New York. All came from the milieu of the Ottonian court: an inscription says that Archbishop Gotfredus presented the Milan example in anticipation of a visit by the Emperor, also referred to in the London example which was possibly from the same workshop. The latest and most lavish is the Aachen example, which is studded with jewels and shows an enthroned Emperor, surrounded by a pope and archbishops. This was probably made in Trier about 1000.

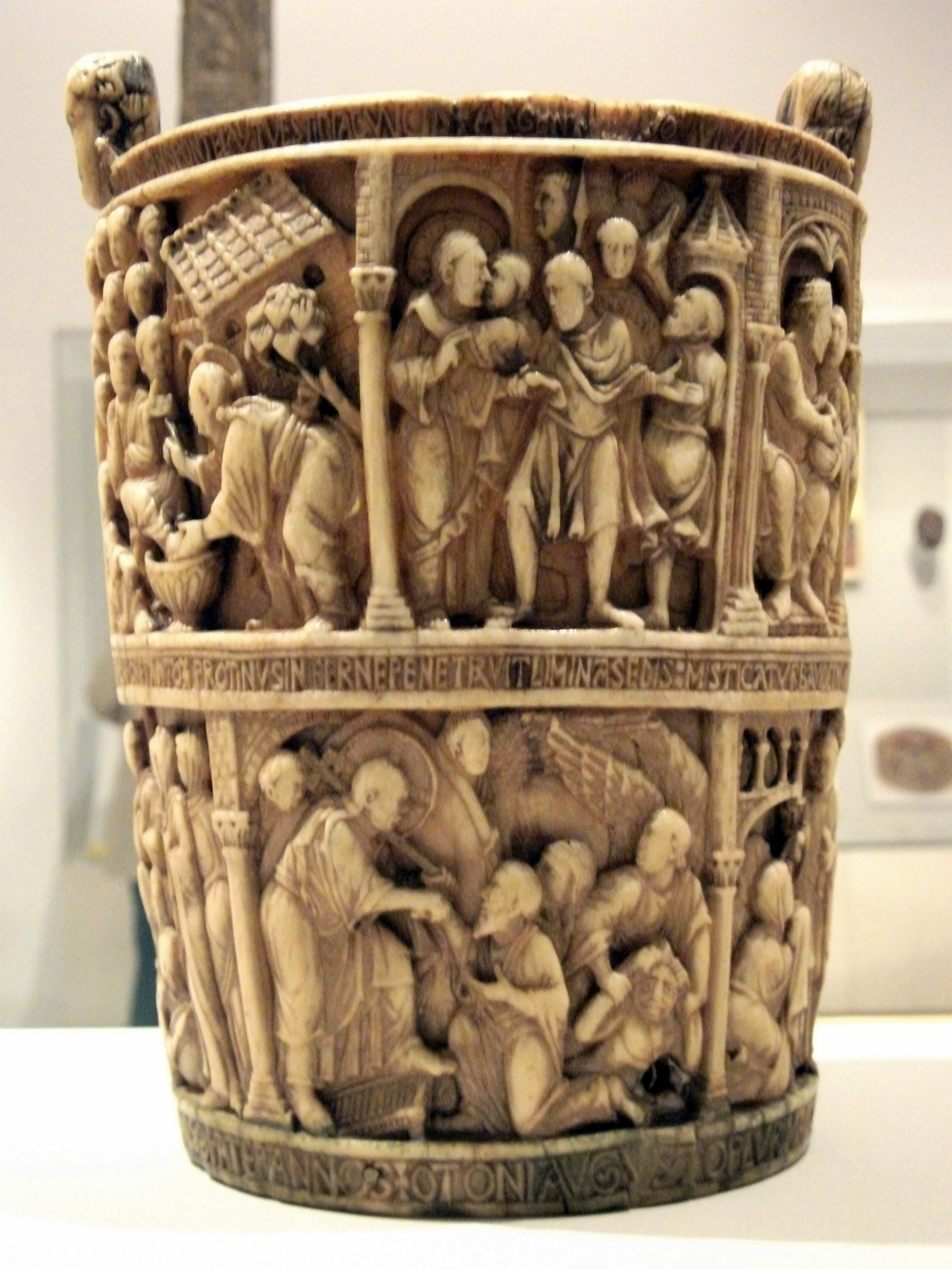
The Basilewsky Situla, 920, Ottonian, in ivory

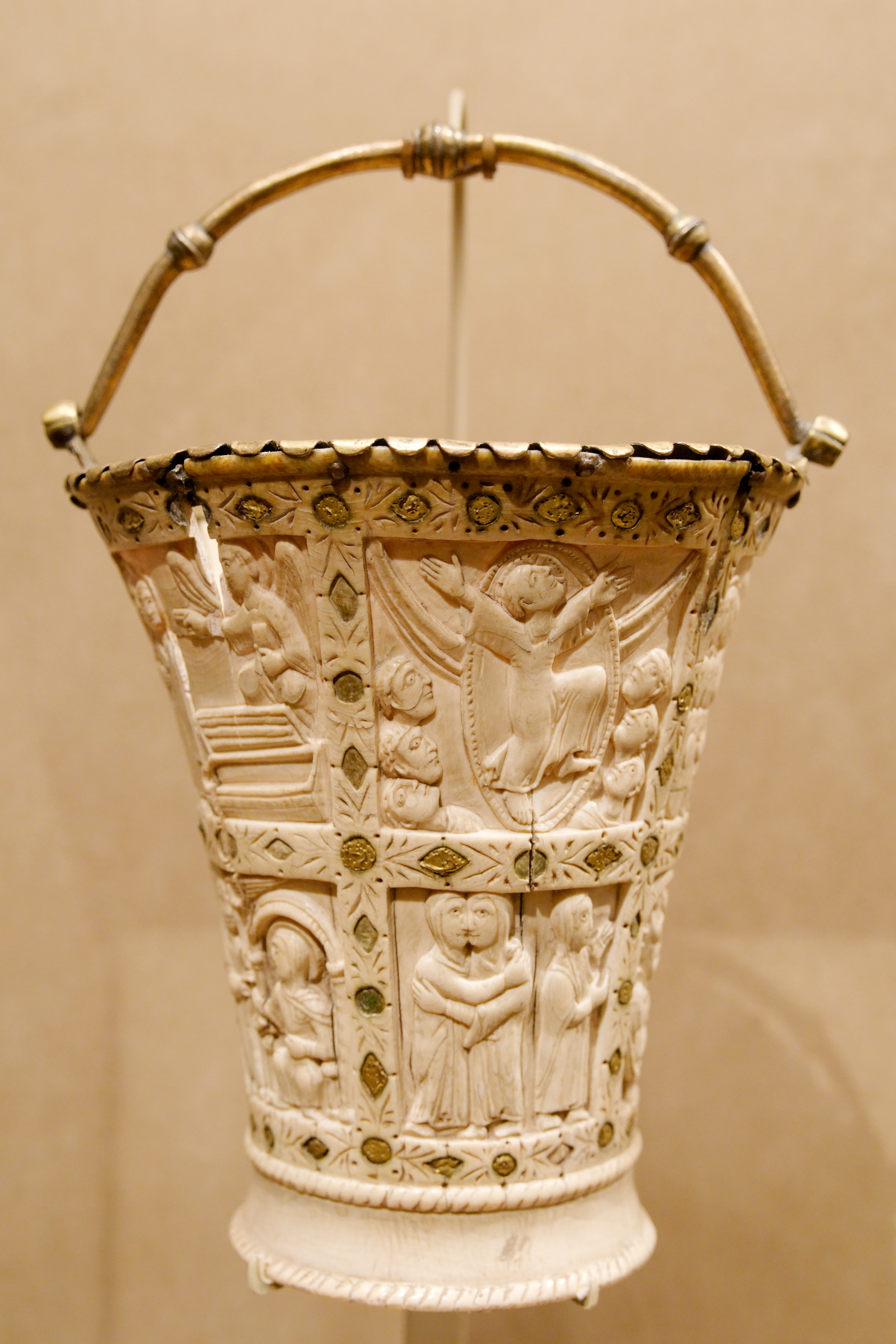
Ottonian ivory situla with scenes from the Life of Christ c. 860–880 AD

== Outside Europe ==
The term may also be used for similar vessels from other cultures, especially the ancient Middle East and China and Vietnam.

Bronze bath buckets are also found in Islamic art, such as the 12th century Persian Bobrinsky Bucket in the Hermitage Museum.

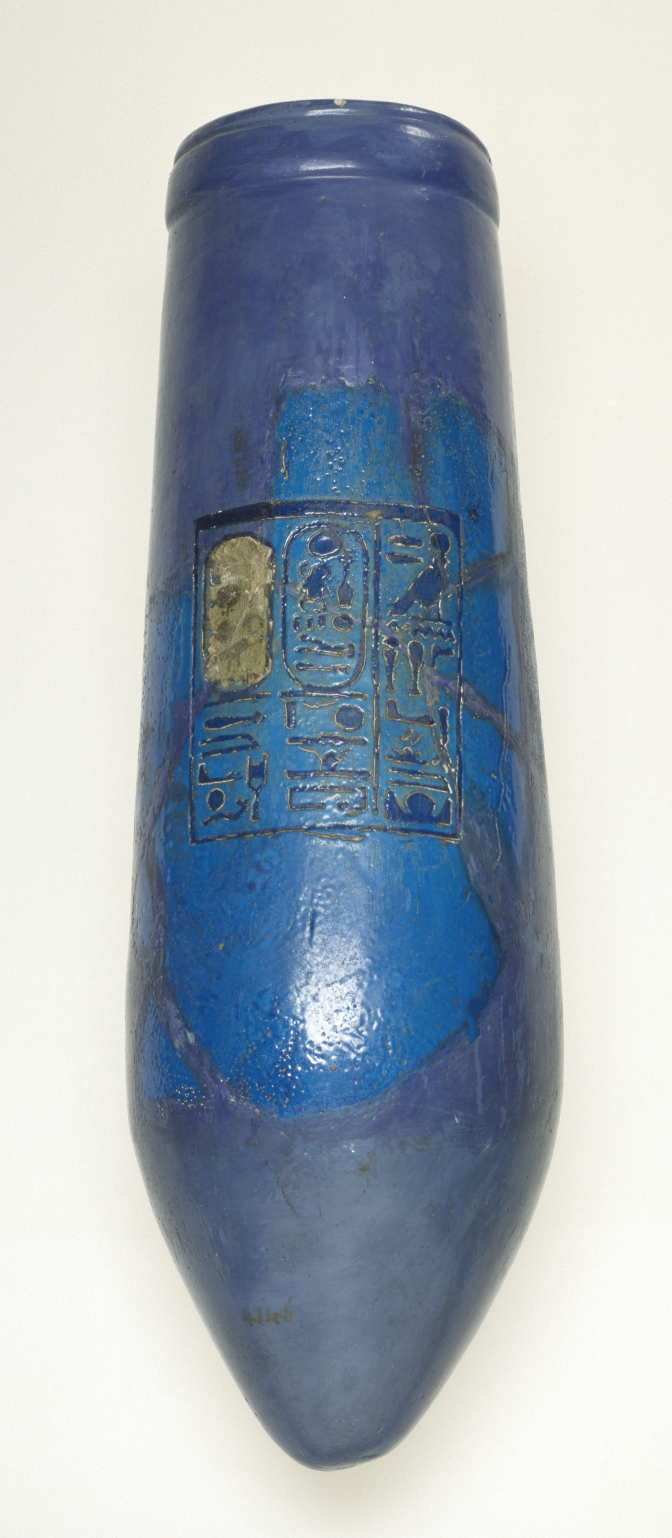
Egyptian faience situla with erased cartouche of Akhenaten, 12 inches high

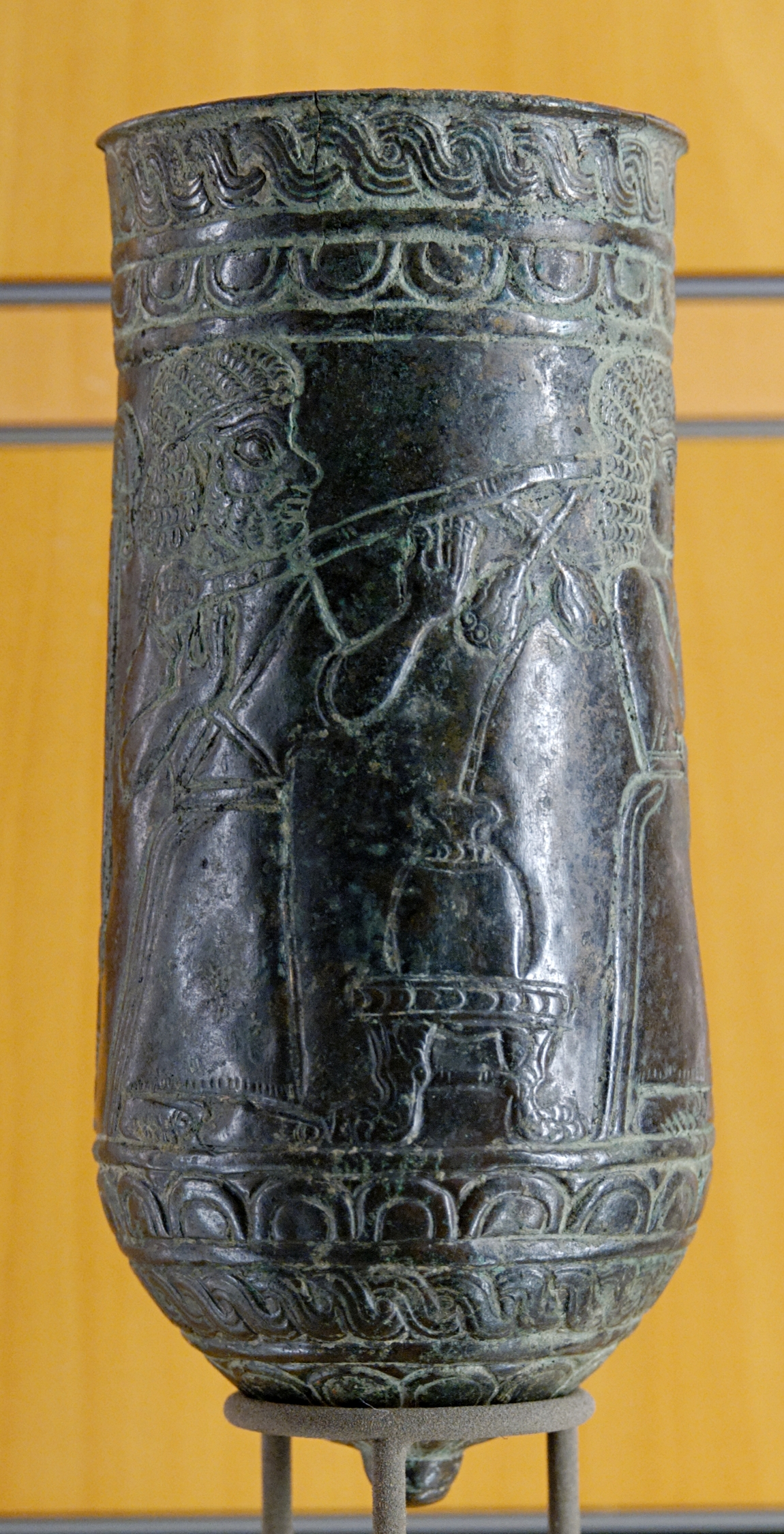
Situla from Luristan, 9th century BC; note the "nipple" at the bottom

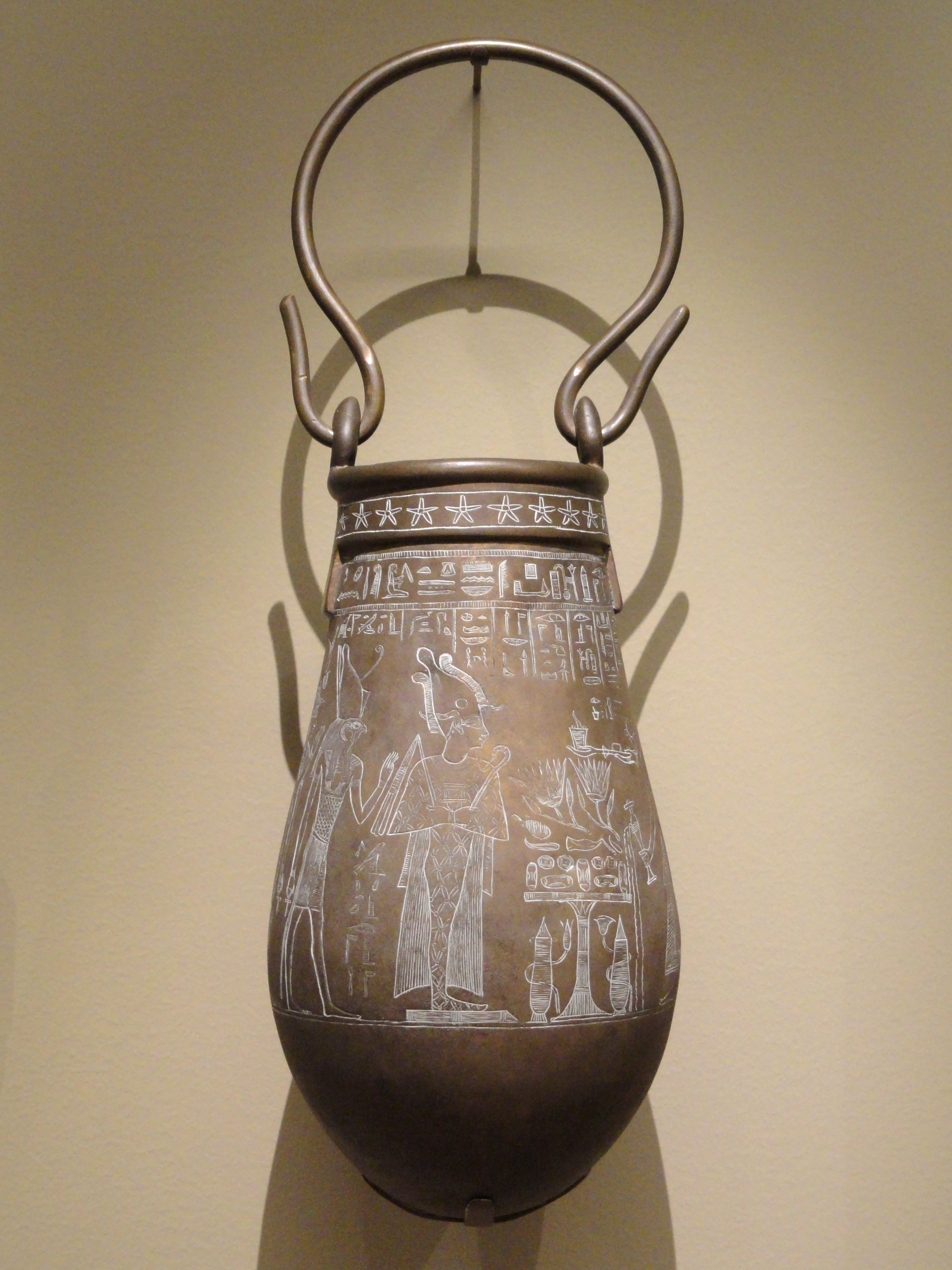
Egyptian, 305–30 BC, Ptolemaic Dynasty, bronze

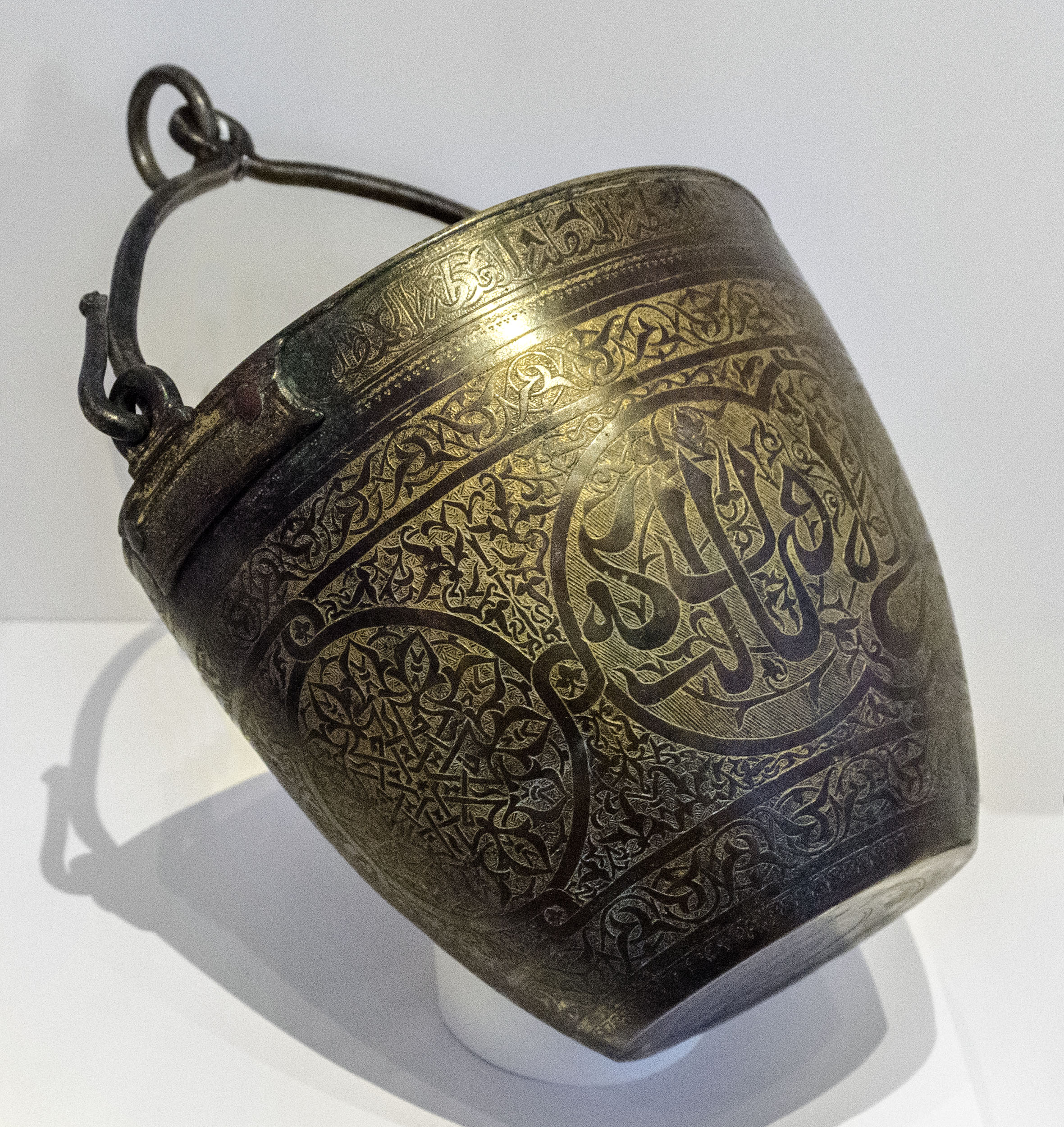
Nasrid situla from the Alhambra, 14th century. Bronze with niello.
