= Chariot burial =

Tombs where deceased are buried with their chariot

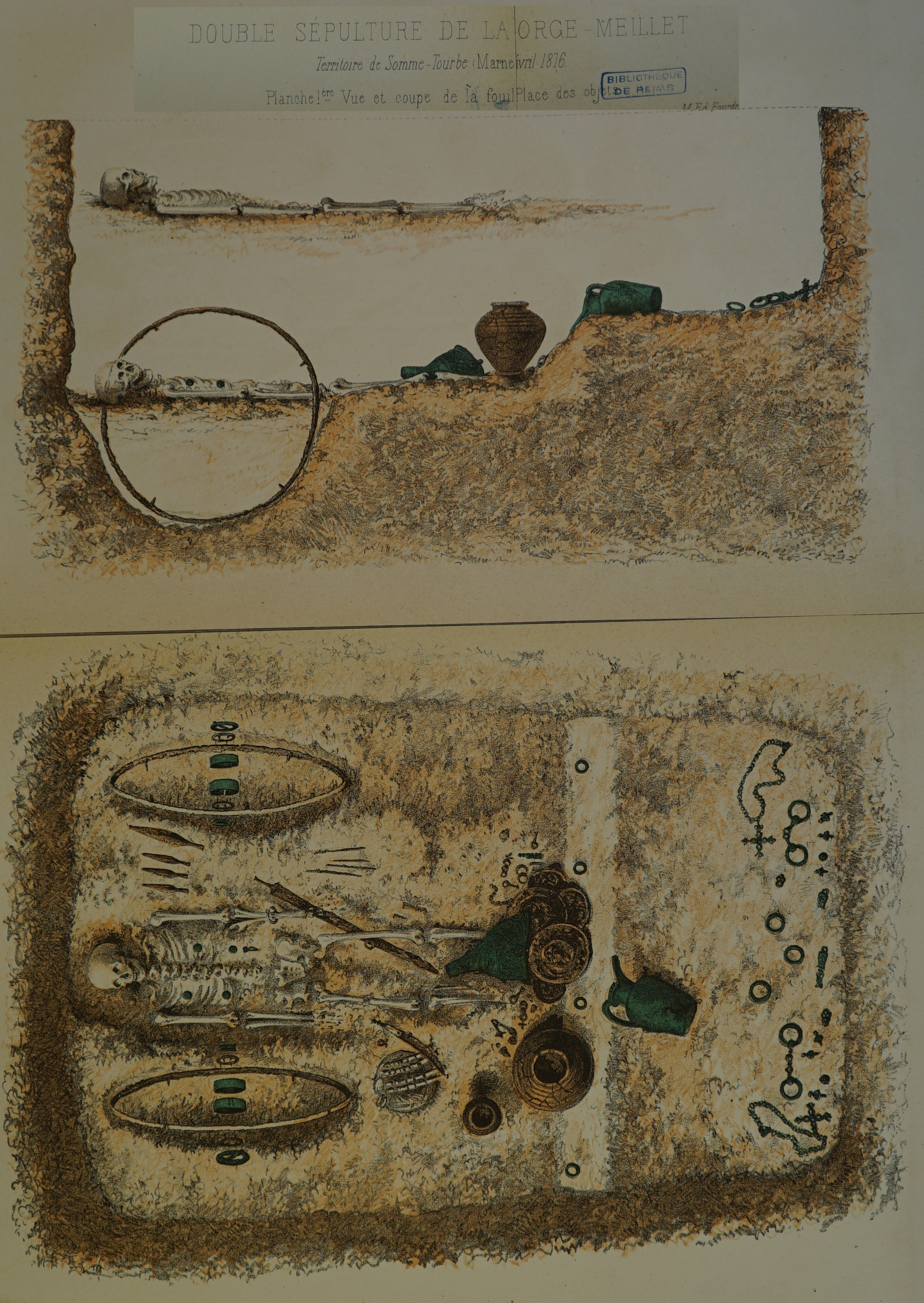
Drawing of the La Gorge-Meillet burial; the chariot-driver was interred above his master

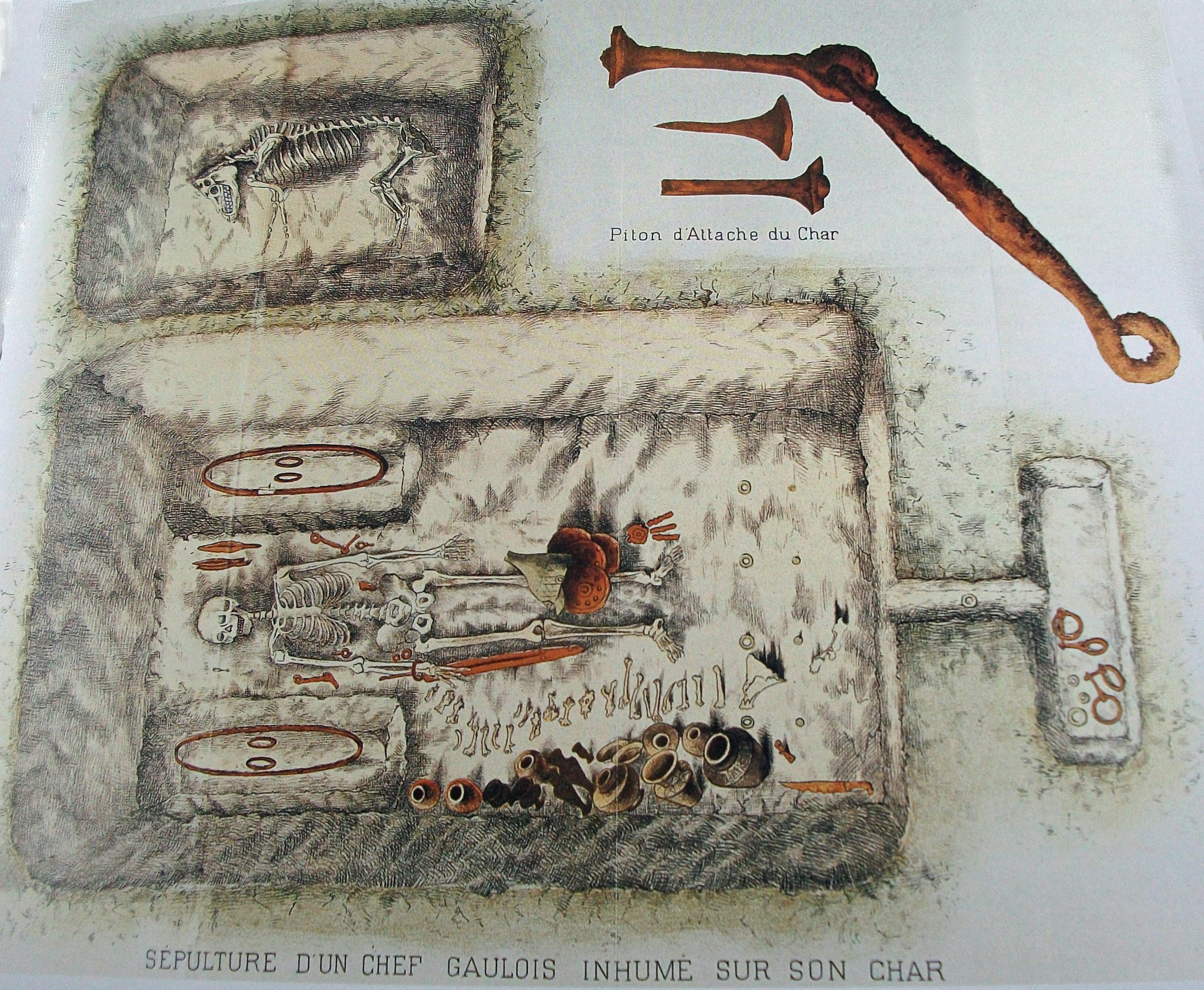
Another French burial

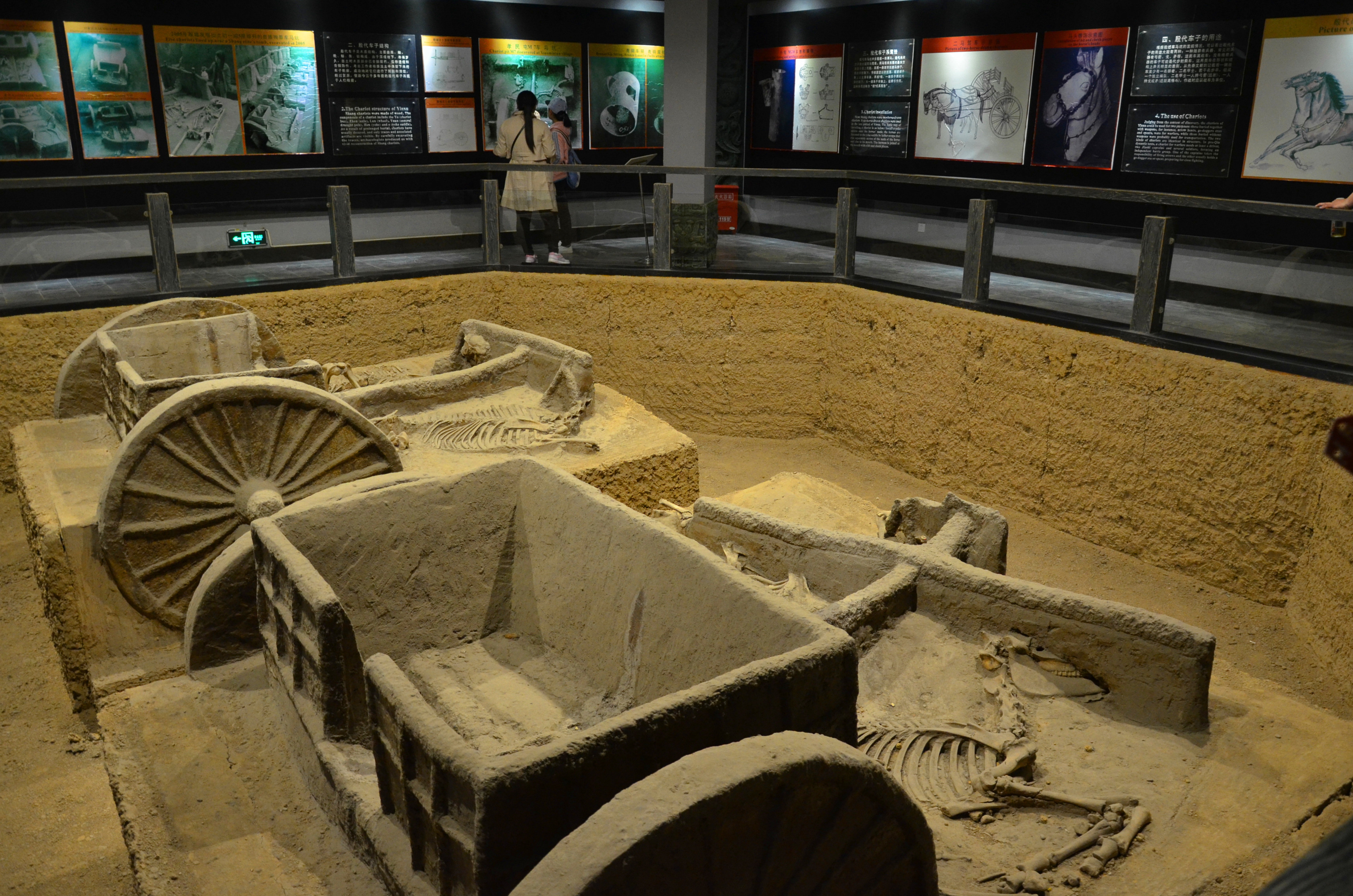
Chariot pit uncovered at a Yin- (also known as Shang)-dynasty (c. 1,200 BC) burial in Henan, China.

Chariot burials are tombs in which the deceased was buried together with their chariot, usually including their horses and other possessions. An instance of a person being buried with their horse (without the chariot) is called horse burial.

== Finds ==
Novokorsunskaya kurgan in the Kuban region of Russia contains a wagon grave of the Maykop culture (which also had horses). The two solid wooden wheels from this kurgan have been dated to the second half of the fourth millennium. Soon thereafter the number of such burials in this Northern Caucasus region multiplied.

The earliest true chariots known are from around 2000 BC, in burials of the Sintashta-Petrovka culture in modern Russia in a cluster along the upper Tobol river, southeast of Magnitogorsk. They contained spoke-wheeled chariots drawn by teams of two horses. The culture is at least partially derived from the earlier Yamna culture, where some wagon-burials are found, and is interpreted by certain scholars to have Indo-Iranian features. The Krivoye Ozero chariot grave contained a horse skull, three pots, two bridle cheek pieces, and points of spears and arrows.

Later chariot burials are found in China. The most noted of these was discovered in 1933 at Hougang, Anyang in central China's Henan Province, dating from the rule of King Wu Ding of the Yin Dynasty (c. 1200 BC). A Western Zhou (9th century BC) chariot burial was unearthed at Zhangjiapo, Chang'an in 1955. The burial of full-sized chariots declined after the Zhou dynasty. For example, around the Mausoleum of the First Qin Emperor (completed 208 BC), there is evidence of one full-sized, wooden chariot burial, but most of the buried chariots are half-size models made of bronze, together with bronze horses.

In Europe, chariot burials are known from Iron Age (8th century BC) Salamis, Cyprus, Tomba Regolini Galassi in Etruria (7th century BC), Italy, and from Beilngries (7th century BC), the Hallstatt C culture in Germany. Chariot burial was an Iron Age Celtic custom; while the wooden chariot has decayed, the horse harness, usually in bronze, survives well, and enough is left of the iron wheel covers and other iron parts to enable well-informed reconstructions. Only the richest were buried in this way, and there are often many other grave-goods. The 4th-century Waldalgesheim chariot burial is one of the best known. A tomb from the 4th century BC was discovered in La Gorge-Meillet, Marne in France; another (450–300) at Somme-Bionne.

In addition to the Etruscan tomb in Italy, there are two chariot burials at Sesto Calende, south of Lake Maggiore, of the Golasecca culture dating to the 7th and 6th century BC accompanied by weapons, ornaments and a large situla while an earlier burial of the same culture, at Ca' Morta – Como (c. 700 BC), included a four-wheeled wagon in the tomb.

In England, chariot burials are characteristic of, and almost confined to, the Iron Age Arras culture associated with the Parisii tribe. Finds of such burials are rare, and the persons interred were presumably chieftains or other wealthy notables. The Wetwang Slack chariot burial of c. 300 BC is unusual in that a woman was interred with the chariot. In 2017 another chariot burial was unearthed in Pocklington, in the East Riding of Yorkshire, dated to 320 to 174 BC. This was the first chariot burial in the UK to have been found with horses also interred. In addition to pony skeletons, the remains of the presumed driver were found, along with iron fragments from the chariot's body. A bronze shield in the grave was exceptionally well preserved. "The discoveries are set to widen our understanding of the Arras (Middle Iron Age) culture and the dating of artefacts to secure contexts is exceptional," said Paula Ware, managing director at MAP Archaeological Practice Ltd.

Some 21 British sites are known, spanning approximately four centuries, virtually all in the East Riding of Yorkshire. The Ferrybridge and Newbridge (near Edinburgh) chariots are unusual in Britain as they are the only ones to be buried intact. The burial custom seems to have disappeared after the Roman occupation of Britain.

== See also ==
- Ship burial
- Sun chariot
- Prehistoric Britain
- The King's Grave
- Newbridge chariot
- Arras Culture
