= Newbridge chariot =

Coordinates: 55.9366°N 3.4054°W

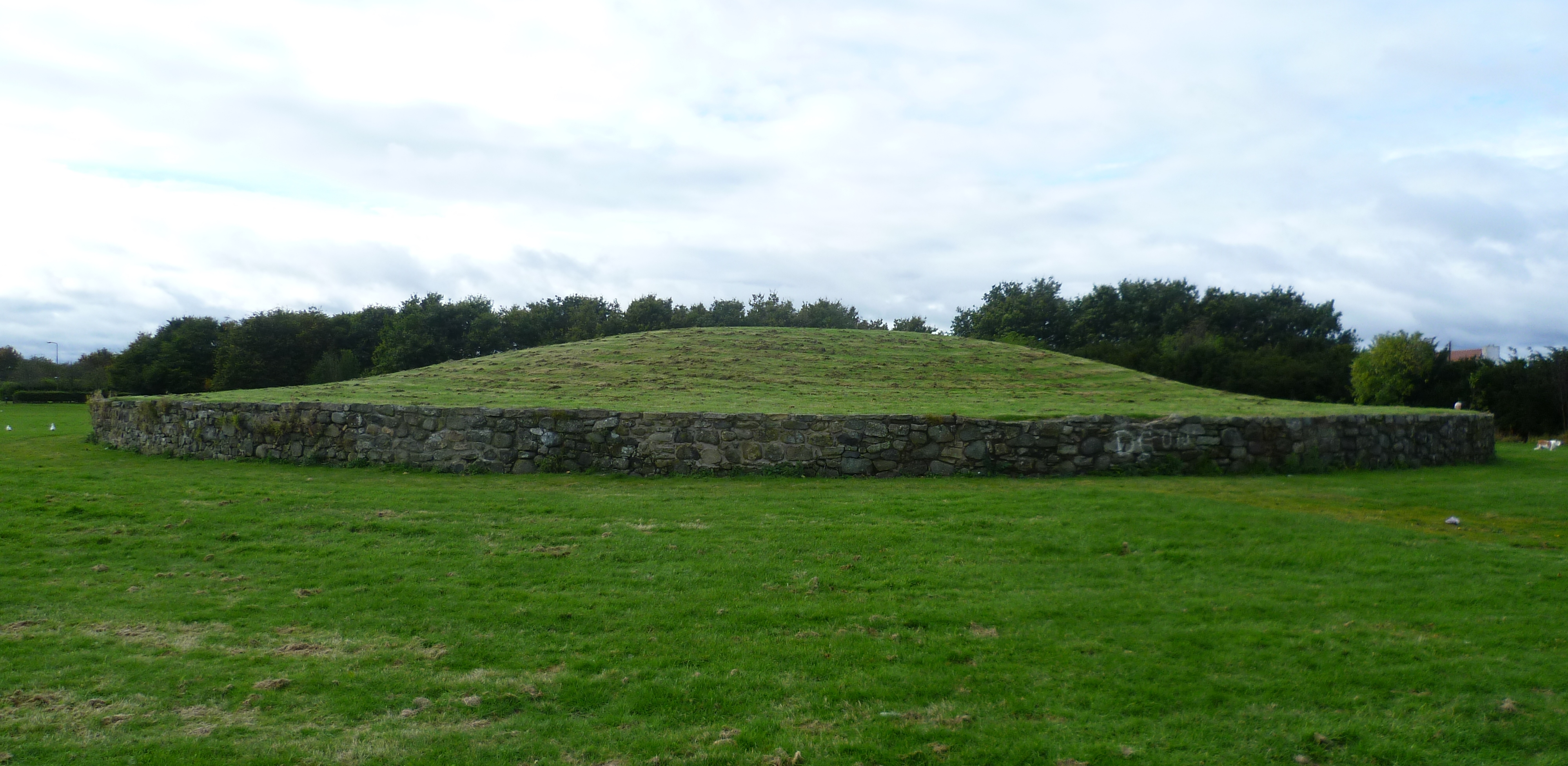
Huly Hill burial mound

The remains of an Iron Age chariot burial were found near the Bronze Age burial mound at Huly Hill, Newbridge in Scotland, 14 km west of Edinburgh city centre, in advance of development at the Edinburgh Interchange. The chariot was the first of its kind to be found in Scotland and shows Iron Age Scotland in direct contact with the European Continent. The Newbridge chariot was buried intact, a method consistent with the burial practices of Continental Europe rather than Scotland.

== Excavation ==
East wheel

The excavation of the Newbridge chariot burial was carried out by a team from Headland Archaeology and conservators from the National Museum of Scotland. The excavation revealed that the pit would have been little larger than the chariot. It was dug to the depth of the axle then two smaller pits were cut into its base to receive the wheels. A narrower slot accommodated the chariot pole but broadened at the end for the yoke. From the outset it was clear that the iron tyres and other metal fittings around each wheel were well-preserved and it was decided to lift each wheel in a block of soil, allowing specialist excavation and conservation under laboratory conditions.

The poor preservation conditions meant that all traces of a human body had disappeared but given the strong parallels of inhumations accompanying chariot burials there is no reason to doubt the former presence of a body in the pit. The burial may have been part of a larger prehistoric cemetery and enclosure, which surrounded it.

The only other area of Britain where chariot burials have been found is of the Arras culture in East Yorkshire, in which most of the chariots were dismantled before burial. The Newbridge example was buried intact in a similar manner to burials in mainland Europe. Chariot construction techniques indicate links with the building traditions of both Yorkshire and Continental Europe. A 5th century BC date for the Newbridge chariot burial places it within the context of La Tene A, consistent with its similarities to European examples and predating known Yorkshire examples.

Apart from the wheels and harness fittings there were few other finds. Some horse gear was recovered near the yoke of the chariot.

== See also ==
- Chariot burial
- Arras culture
- British Iron Age
