= Somme-Tourbe =

- Commune
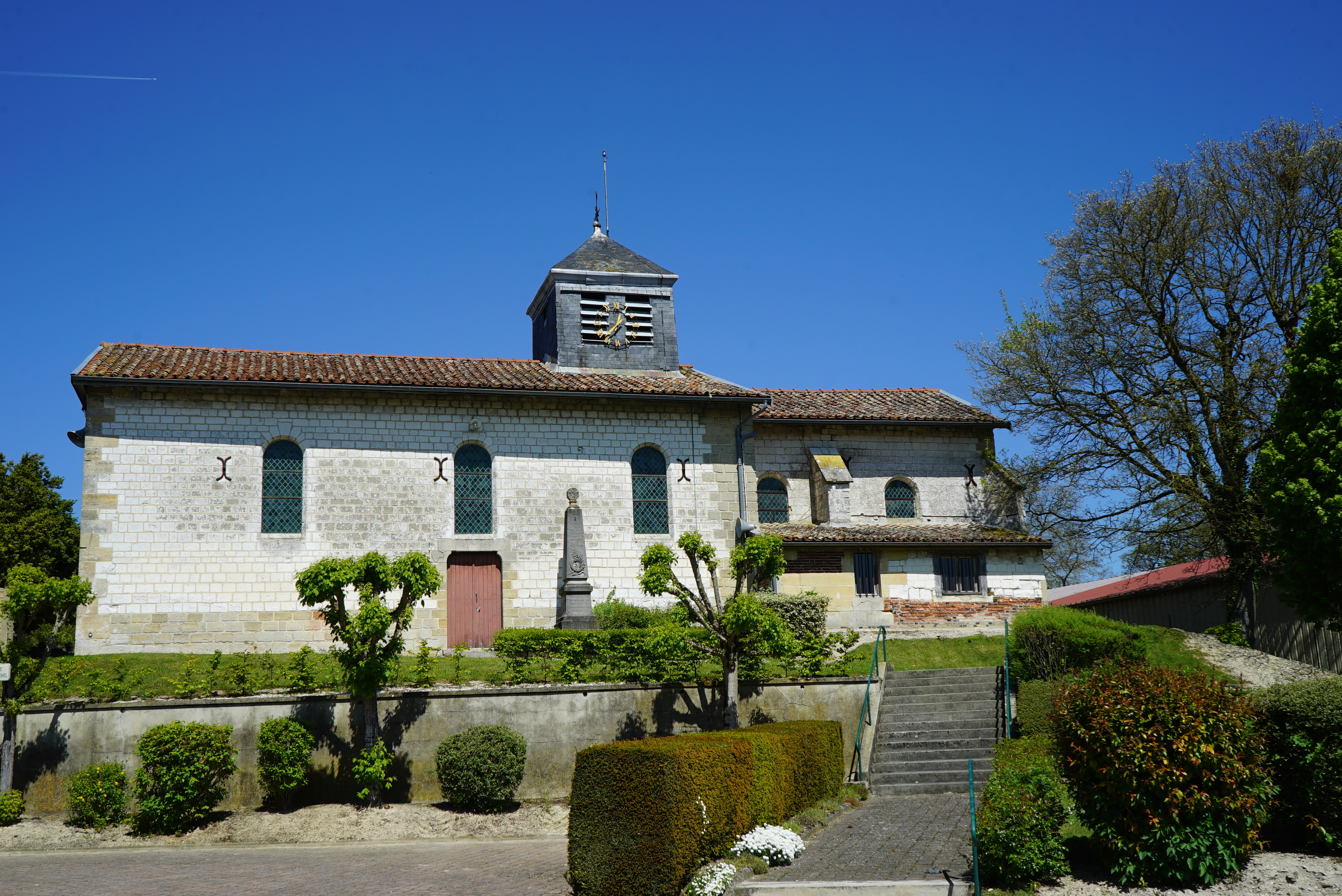
- The church in Somme-Tourbe
- Location of Somme-Tourbe
- Location within France Location within Grand Est
- Coordinates: 49°06′07″N 4°40′10″E
- Country: France
- Region: Grand Est
- Department: Marne
- Arrondissement: Châlons-en-Champagne
- Canton: Argonne Suippe et Vesle

Government
  - Mayor (2020–2026): Marie-Claire Laurent
- Area^{1}: 19.39 km^{2} (7.49 sq mi)
- Elevation: 163 m (535 ft)
- Population (2023): 141
  - Density: 7.27/km^{2} (18.8/sq mi)
- Time zone: UTC+01:00 (CET)
  - Summer (DST): UTC+02:00 (CEST)
- INSEE/Postal code: 51547 /51600
- ^{1} French Land Register data, which excludes lakes, ponds, glaciers > 1 km^{2} (0.386 sq mi or 247 acres) and river estuaries.

Somme-Tourbe (French pronunciation: [sɔm tuʁb]) is a commune in the Marne department in north-eastern France.

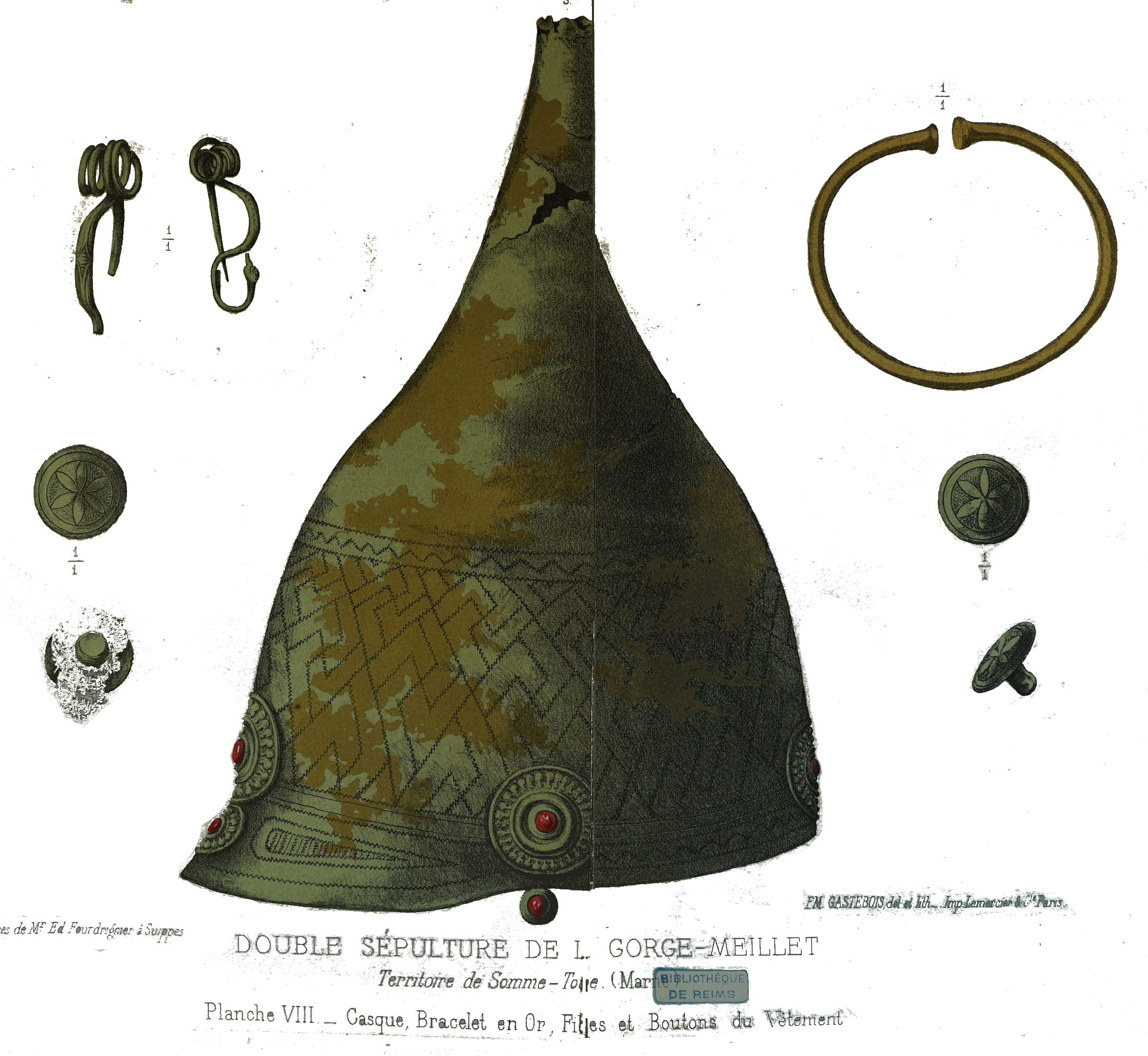
La Gorge-Meillet

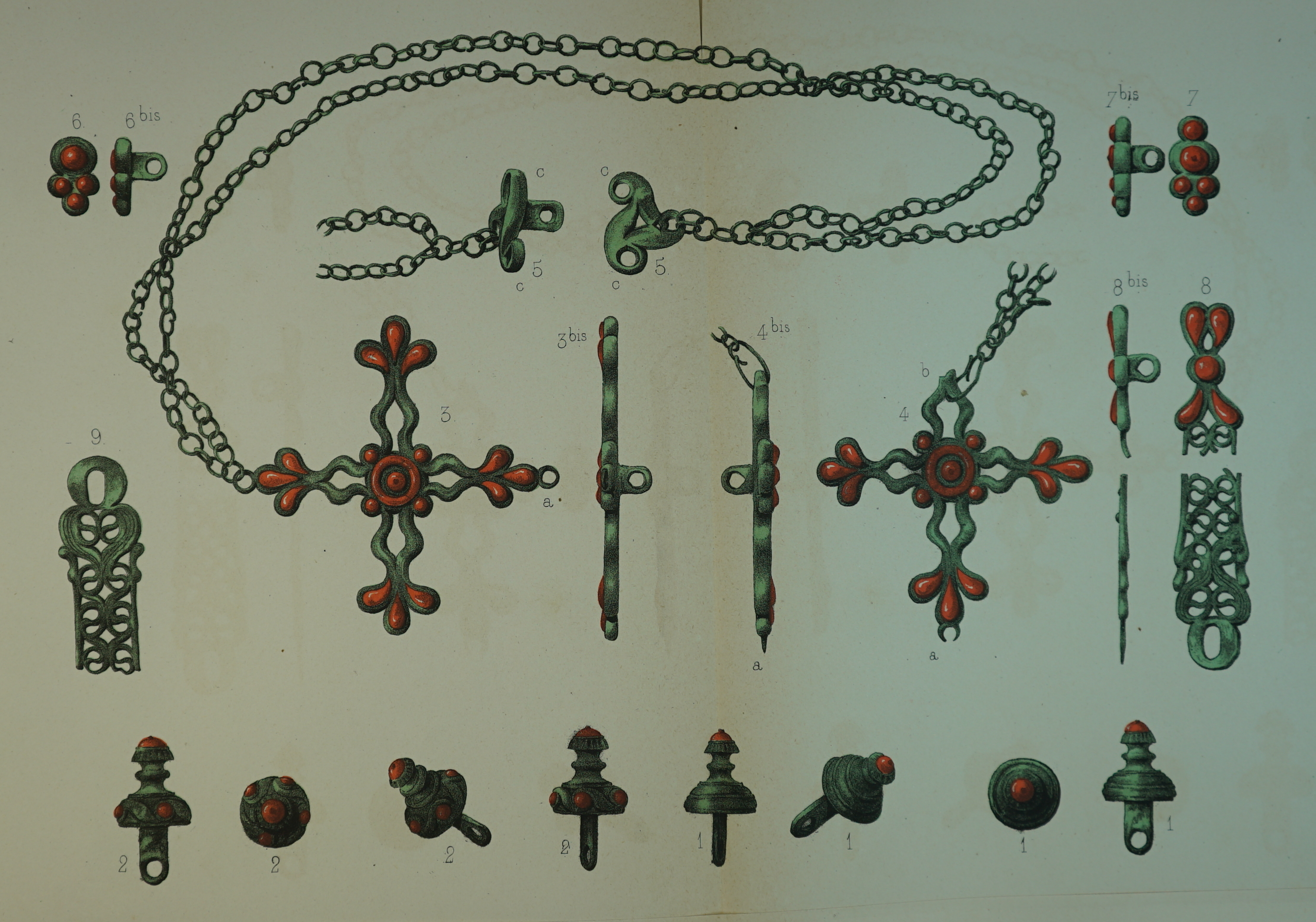
grave.

== See also ==
- Communes of the Marne department
