= Prehistoric Italy =

Prehistory of Italy

The prehistory of Italy began in the Paleolithic period, when members of the genus Homo first inhabited what is now modern Italian territory, and ended in the Iron Age, when the first written records appeared in Italy.

== Paleolithic ==
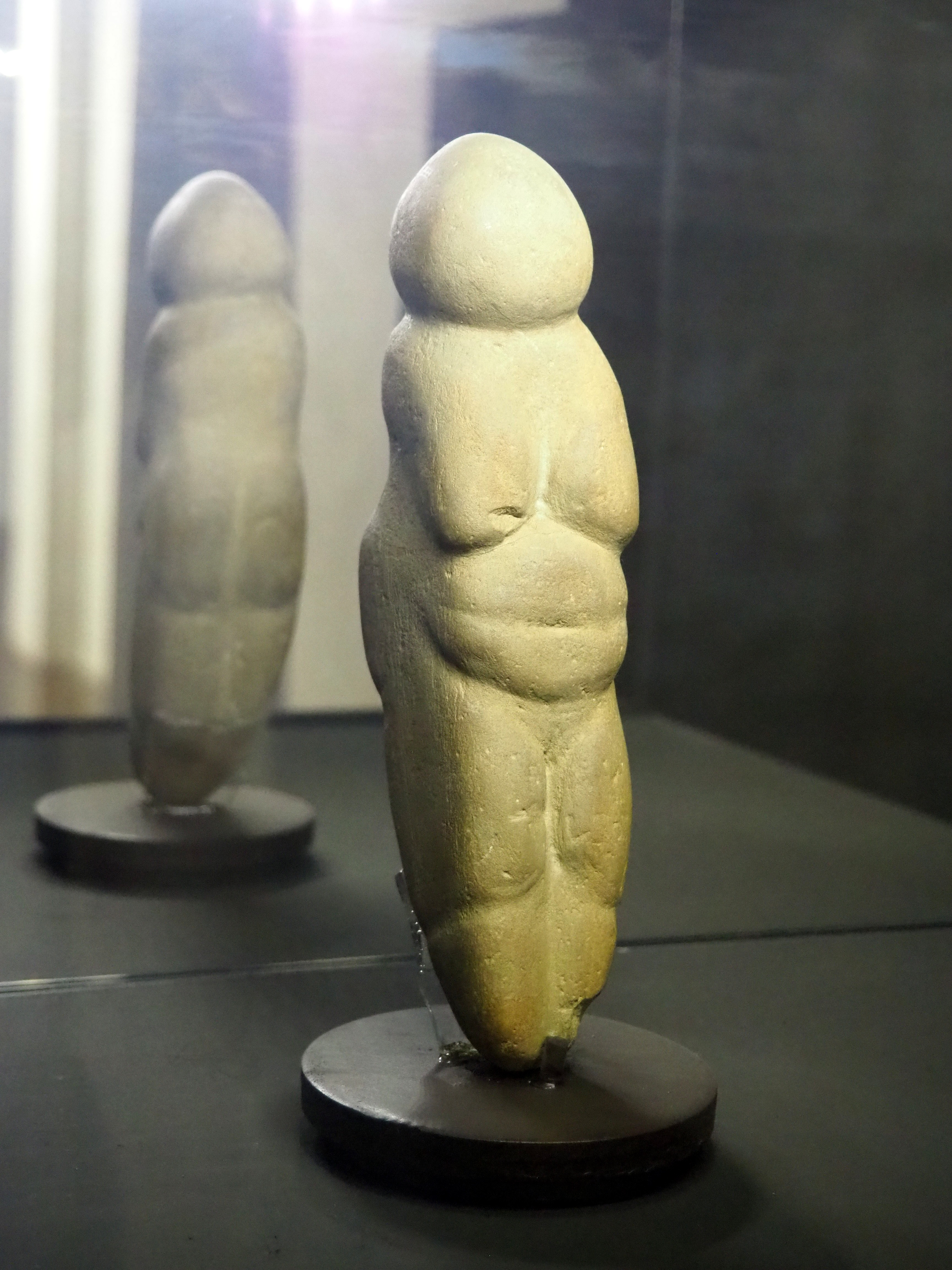
Venere di Chiozza, Upper Paleolithic

In prehistoric times, the landscape of the Italian Peninsula was significantly different from its modern appearance. During glaciations, for example, the sea level was lower and the islands of Elba and Sicily were connected to the mainland. The Adriatic Sea began at what is now the Gargano Peninsula, and what is now its surface up to Venice was a fertile plain with a humid climate.

The arrival of the first known hominins was 850,000 years ago at Monte Poggiolo.

The presence of Homo neanderthalensis has been demonstrated in archaeological findings dating to c. 50,000 years ago (late Pleistocene). There are about 20 unique sites, the most important being that of the Grotta Guattari at San Felice Circeo, on the Tyrrhenian Sea south of Rome; another is at the grotta di Fumane (province of Verona) and the Breuil grotto, also in San Felice.

Homo sapiens sapiens appeared in Italy during the upper Palaeolithic: the earliest site on the peninsula, dated to 48,000 years ago, is Riparo Mochi. In November 2011, tests conducted at the Oxford Radiocarbon Accelerator Unit in England on what were previously thought to be Neanderthal baby teeth, which had been unearthed in 1964 from the Grotta del Cavallo, dated the teeth to between 43,000 and 45,000 years ago.

In 2011, the most ancient Sardinian complete human skeleton (called Amsicora) was discovered at Pistoccu in Marina di Arbus, dated to 8500 years ago during the transition period between the Mesolithic and Neolithic.

== Neolithic ==
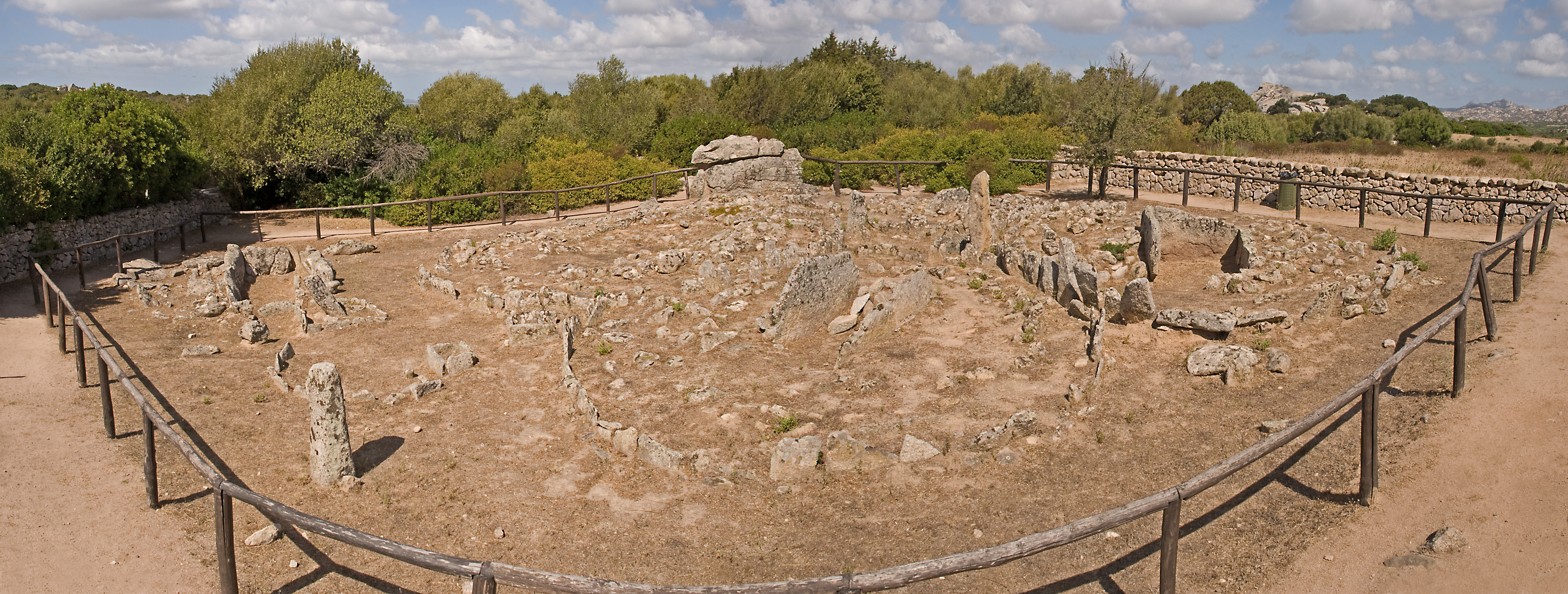
Circular graves of Li Muri at Arzachena, one of the oldest megalithic sites in Italy

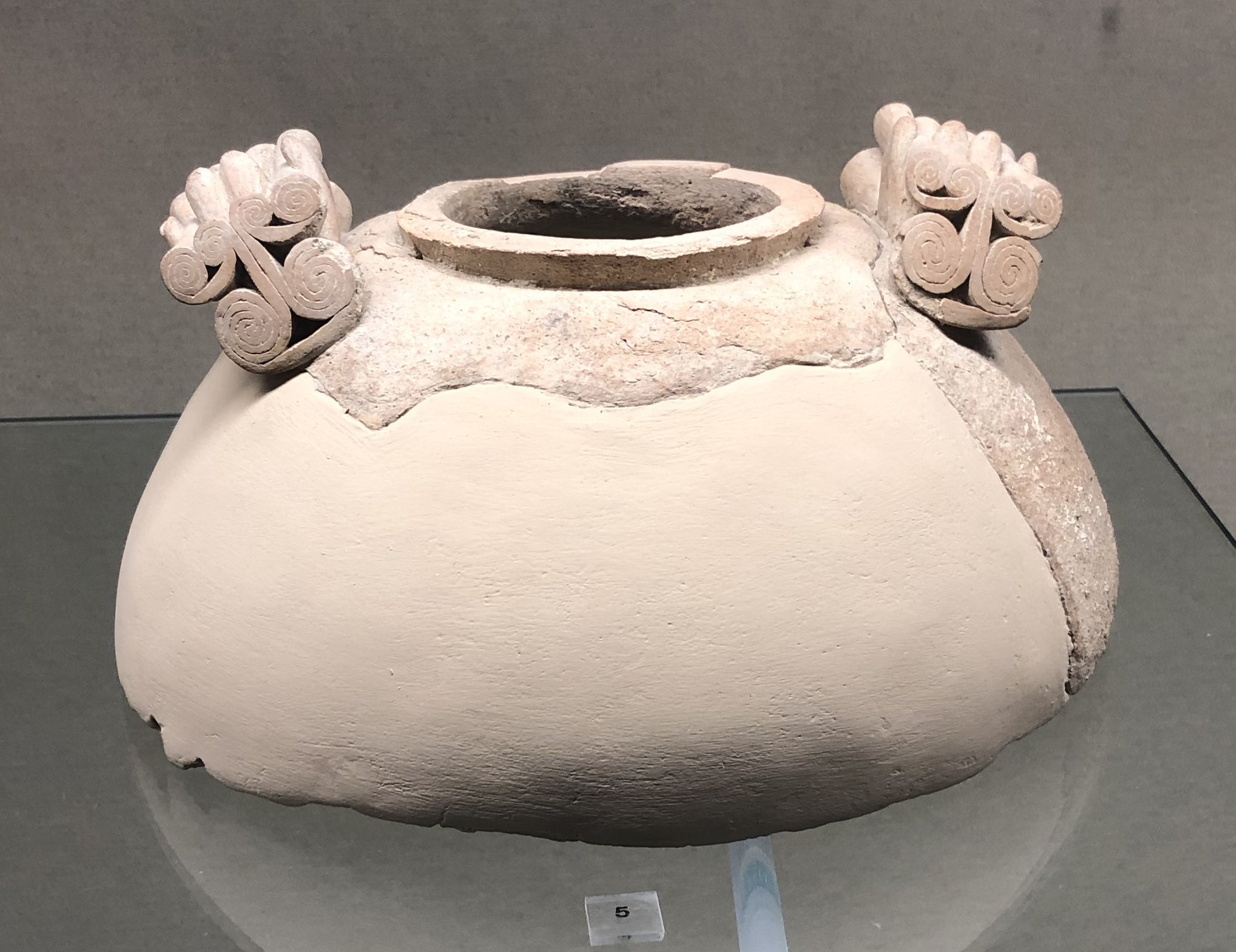
Serra d'Alto culture ceramic vessel, late 5th millennium BC

Cardium pottery is a Neolithic decorative style that gets its name from the practice of imprinting the clay with the shell of Cardium edulis, a marine mollusk. The alternative name Impressed Ware is used by some archaeologists to define this culture, because impressions can be with other sharp objects, such as a nail or comb.

Cardium pottery is found in the zone "covering Italy to the Ligurian coast" as distinct from the more western Cardial beginning in Provence, France and extending to western Portugal. The main culture of the Mediterranean Neolithic, which eventually extended from the Adriatic Sea to the Atlantic coasts of Portugal and south to Morocco, is also referred to as "cardial ware".

Since the Late Neolithic, Aosta Valley, Piedmont, Liguria, Tuscany and Sardinia in particular were involved in the pan-Western European Megalithic phenomenon. Later, in the Bronze Age, megalithic structures were built also in Latium, Puglia and Sicily. Around the end of the third millennium BCE, Sicily imported from Sardinia typical cultural aspects of the Atlantic world, including the construction of small dolmen-shaped structures that reached all over the Mediterranean basin.

== Copper Age ==
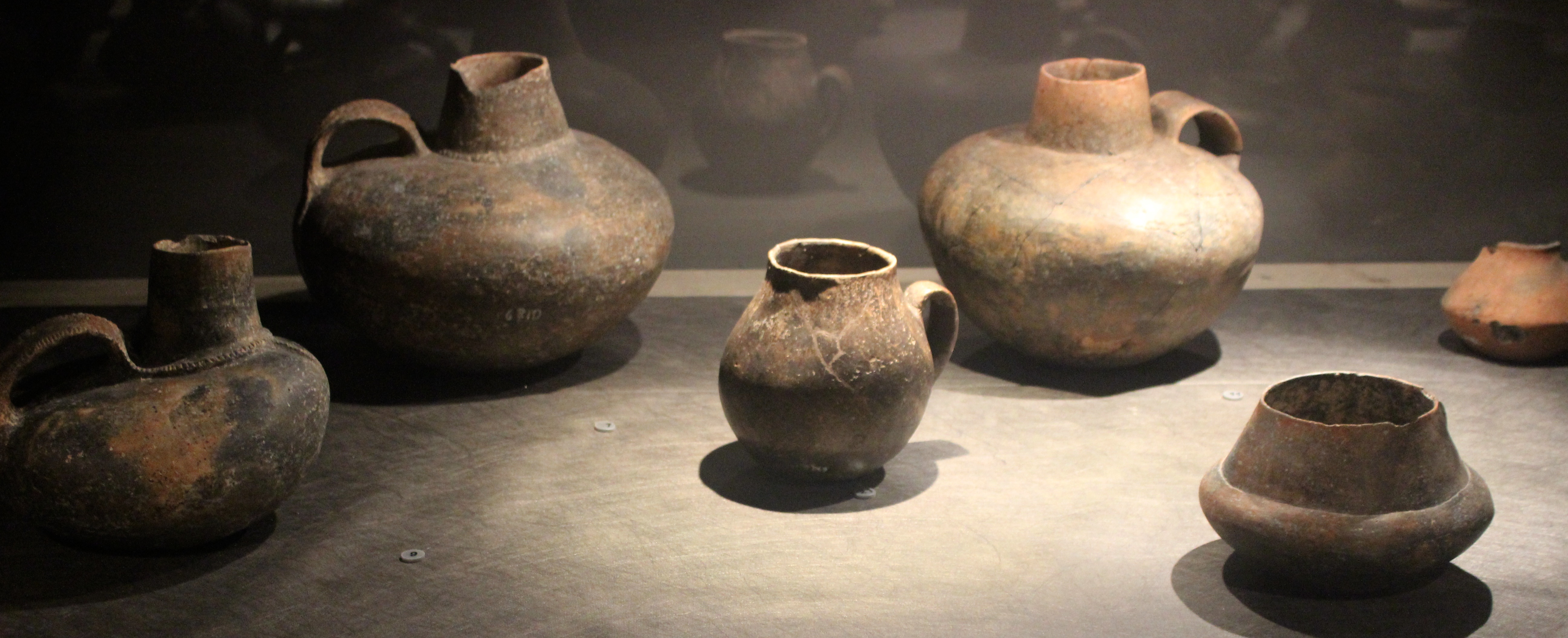
Gaudo culture pottery

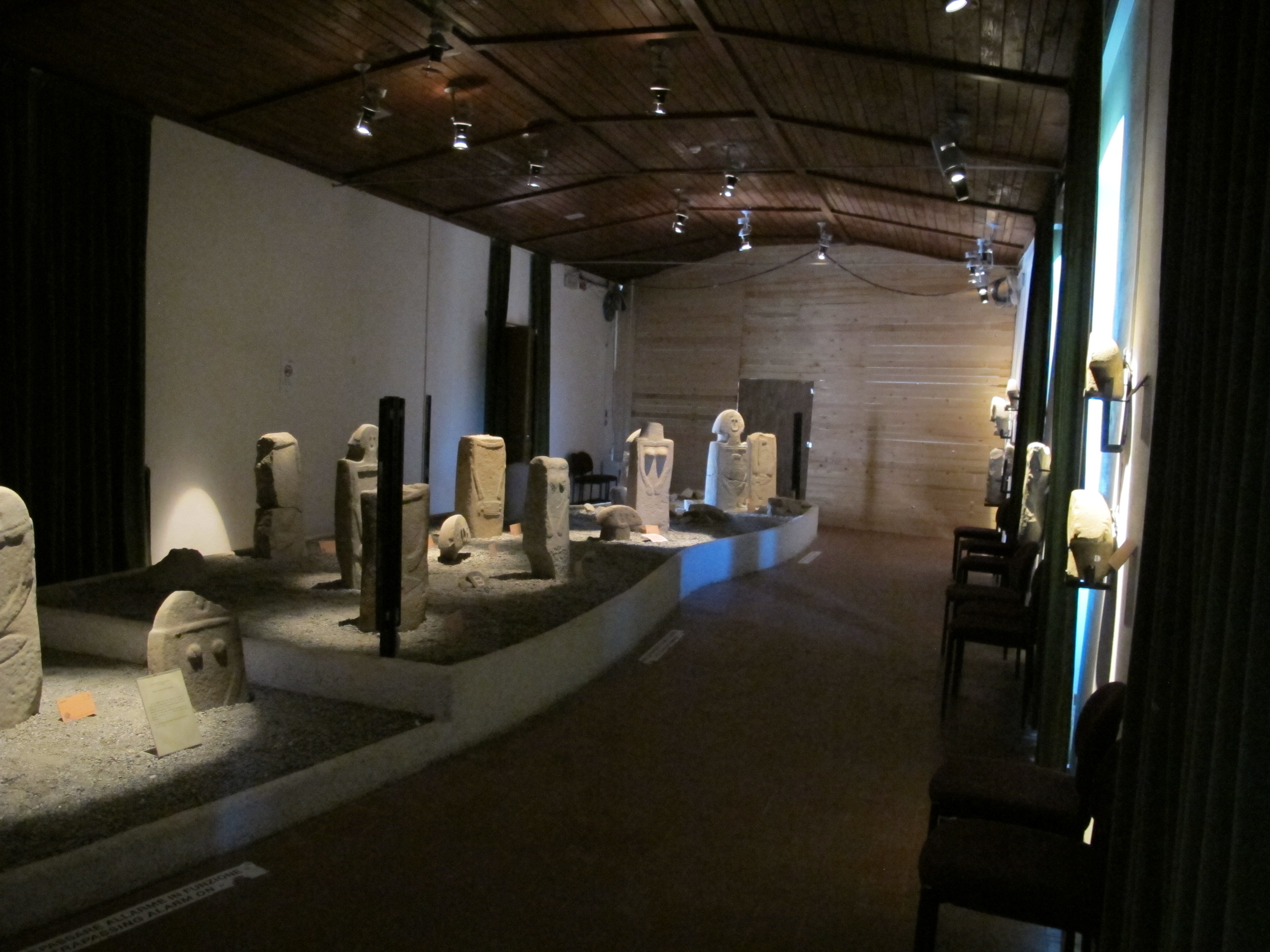
Anthropomorphic stele from Lunigiana, Museo delle statue stele Lunigianesi

The Copper Age arrived early in the Italian geographical area, in particular appearing first in Liguria. Copper mining began in the middle of the 4th millennium BC in Liguria with the Libiola and Monte Loreto mines, which are dated to 3700 BCE. These are the oldest copper mines in the western Mediterranean basin. The Remedello, Rinaldone and Gaudo cultures are late Neolithic cultures of Italy, traces of which are primarily found in the present-day regions of Lombardy, Tuscany, Latium and Campania. They are sometimes described as Eneolithic cultures, due to their use of primitive copper tools. Other important eneolithic cultures of the peninsula and the islands, often related to those previously mentioned, are the Laterza culture in Apulia and Basilicata, the Abealzu-Filigosa culture in Sardinia, the Conelle-Ortucchio culture in Abruzzo and Marche, the Serraferlicchio culture in Sicily, and the Spilamberto group in Emilia-Romagna.

The earliest Statue menhirs, frequently depicting weapons, were erected by the populations of northern Italy and Sardinia during this period. This sculptural tradition of possible steppe origin (Yamna culture), lasted in some regions well into the Bronze Age and even into the Iron Age.

During the Late Copper Age (approximately 2500–2200 BCE), the Bell Beaker phenomenon reached the Italian Peninsula, where its cultural elements were selectively adopted as foreign influences and integrated into pre-existing traditions, particularly the Remedello and Rinaldone cultures, rather than resulting in a complete cultural replacement. This process was most pronounced in the Po Valley, especially around Lake Garda, and in Tuscany, although Bell Beaker materials have also been documented throughout northern and central Italy.

In southern and southeastern Italy, Bell Beaker influences remained limited, initially appearing as isolated adoptions of characteristic Bell Beaker decorative motifs on local pottery in Abruzzo, Apulia and Calabria. Rather than developing into an independent Bell Beaker cultural province, these influences were incorporated into indigenous traditions, producing syncretic pottery forms. Among the later manifestations of this interaction was the Italian Cetina phenomenon, preceded by vessels decorated with stamps and punctures before the emergence of the classic Cetina style, characterized by its distinctive framed decoration.

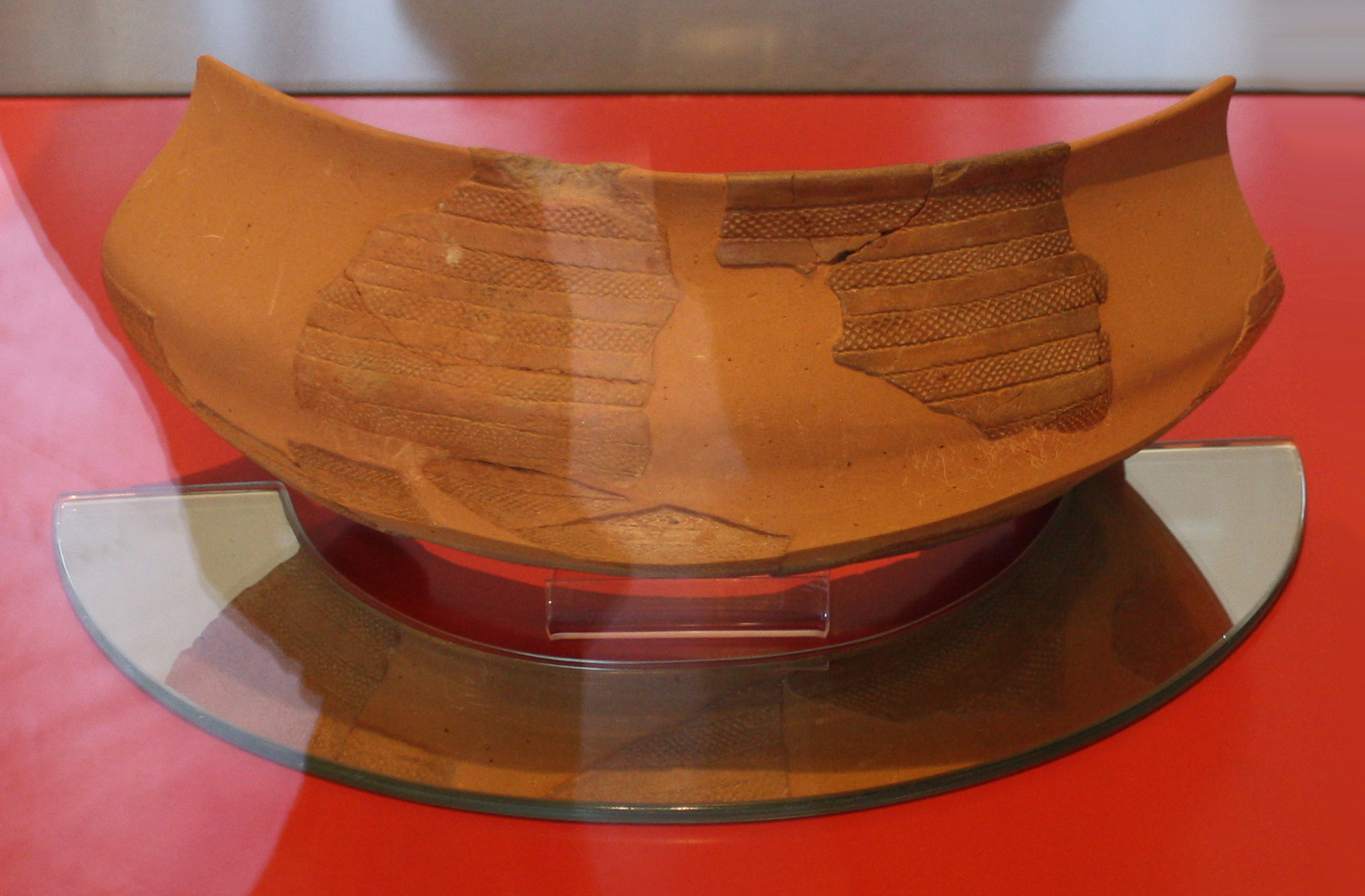
Bell Beaker culture ceramic vessel

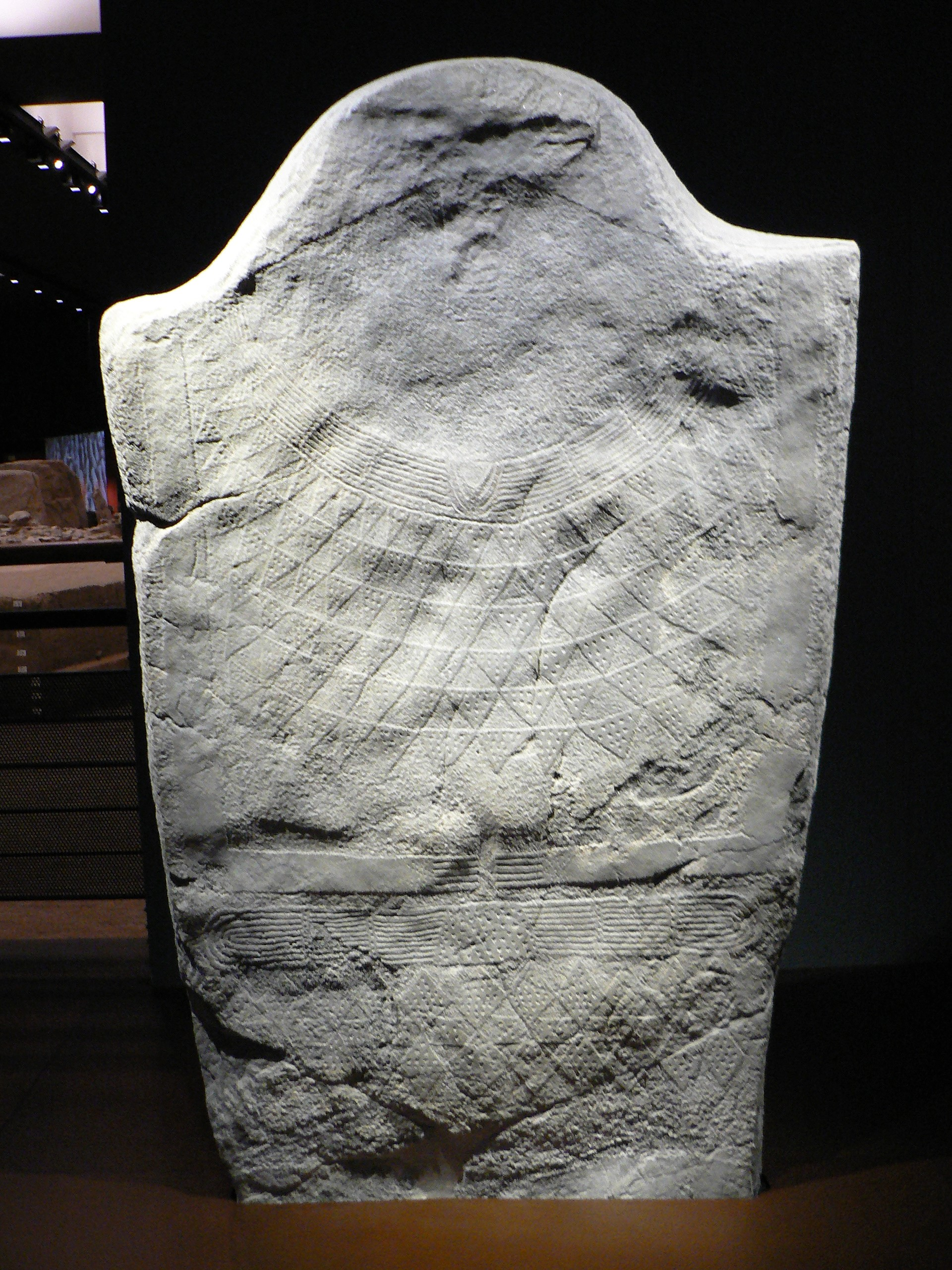
Anthropomorphic stele from St-Martin-de-Corléans, Bell Beaker culture

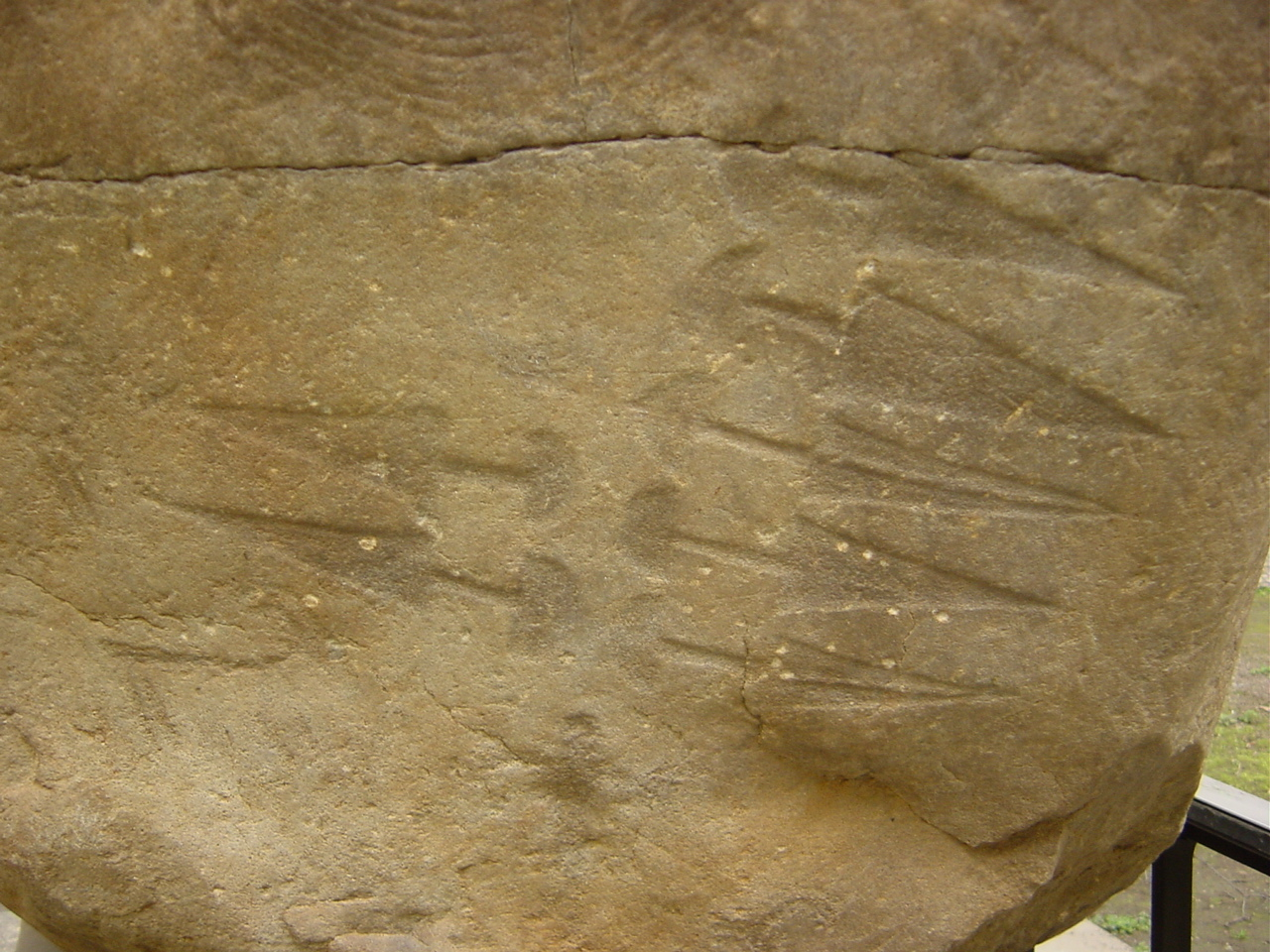
Engravings of Remedello-type daggers at Valcamonica

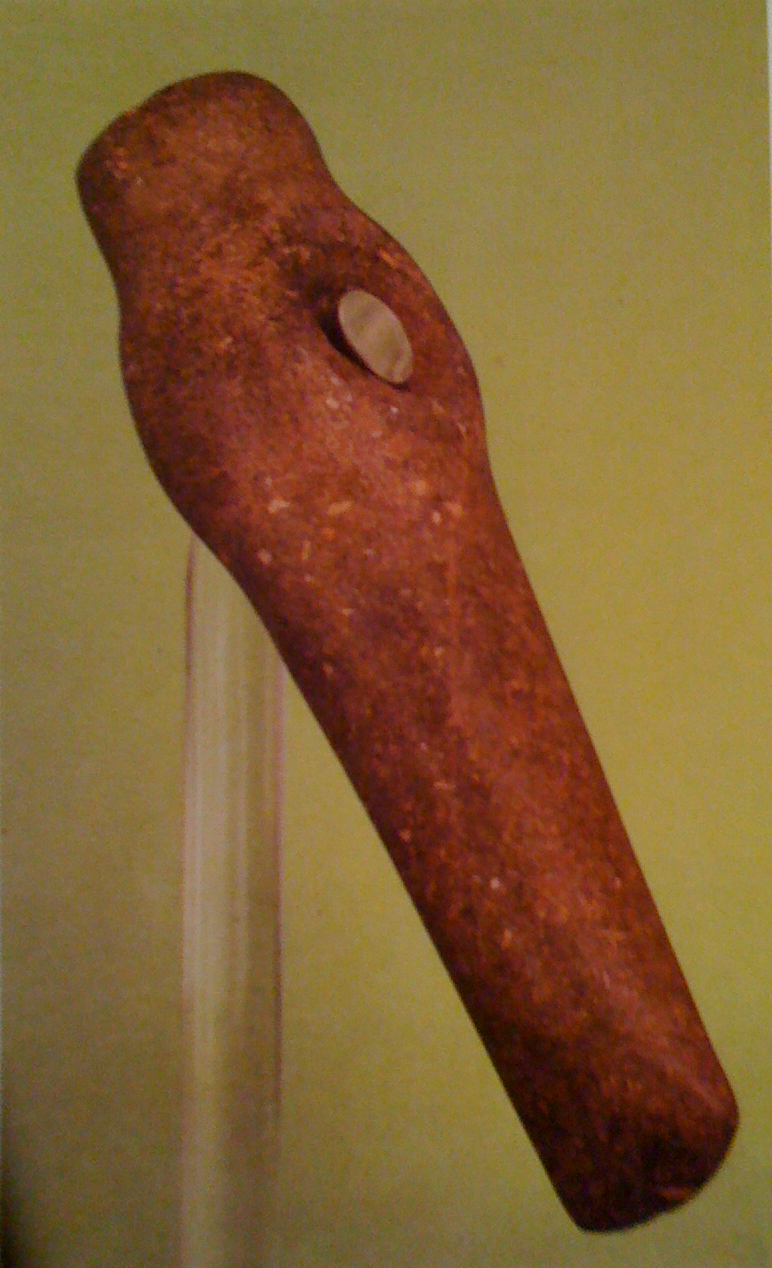
Axe, Rinaldone culture

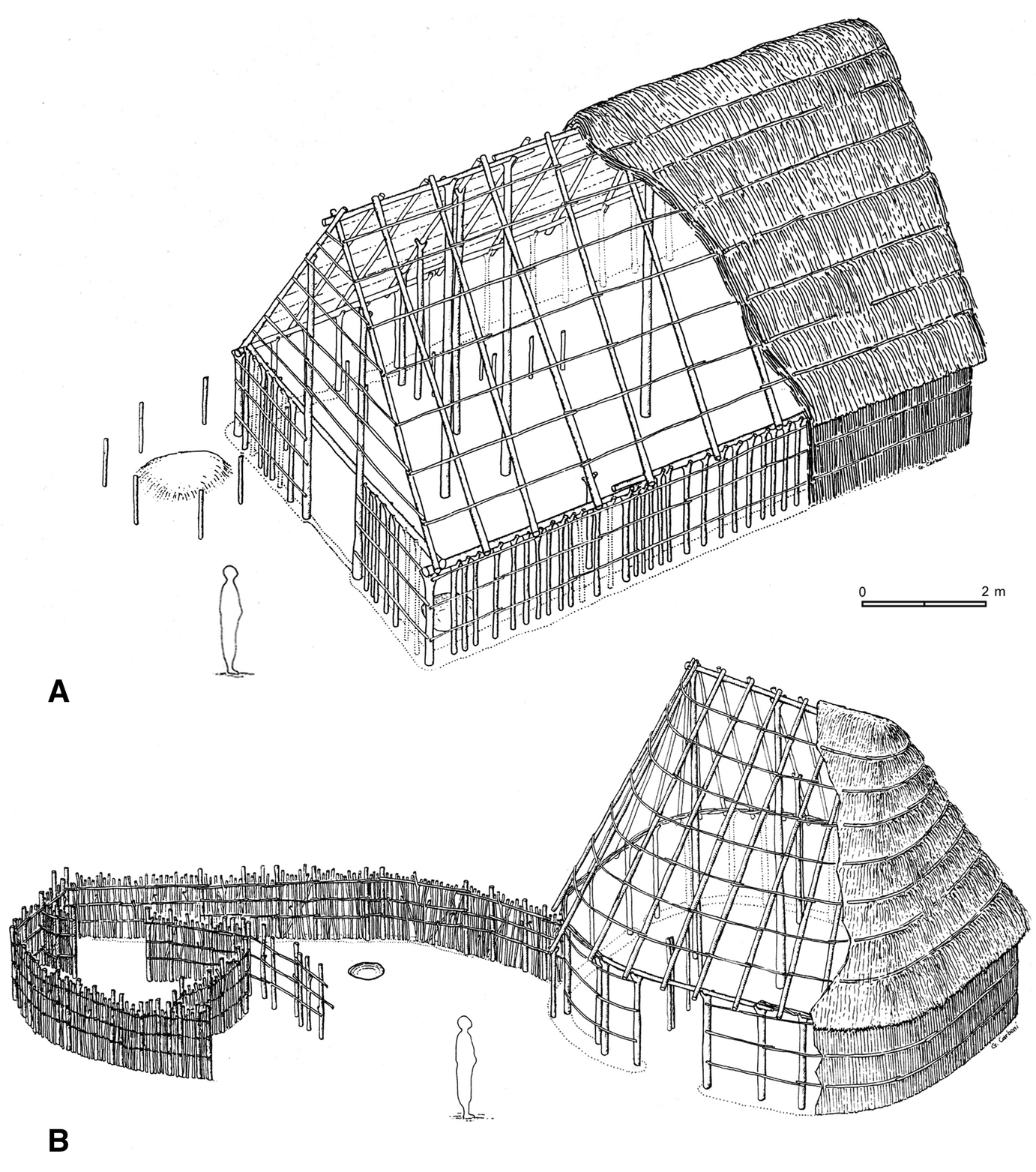
Reconstruction of Copper Age houses from Quadrato di Torre Spaccata, Rome

== Bronze Age ==
The Italian Bronze Age is conditionally divided into four periods:

The Early Bronze Age	2300–1700 B.C
The Middle Bronze Age	1700–1350 B.C
The Recent Bronze Age	1350–1150 B.C
The Final Bronze Age	1150–950 B.C

The Early Bronze Age shows the beginning of a new culture in Northern Italy and is distinguished by the Polada culture. Polada settlements were mainly widespread in wetland locations such as around the large lakes and hills along the Alpine margin. The cities of Toppo Daguzzo and La Starza were known as the center of the Proto-Apennine stage of Palma Campania culture spread in southern Italy at this time. Between the Early Bronze Age and the transitional phase toward the Middle Bronze Age, evidence emerges of a connection with Central Europe, as attested by the spread of triangular daggers throughout Italy, often found in hoards. During this period, the Gáta–Wieselburg culture spread from present-day eastern Austria, western Hungary, and southwestern Slovakia to northeastern Italy.

The Middle Bronze Age known as the Apennine Bronze Age in Central and Southern Italy was the period when settlements were established both on lowland and upland areas. Hierarchy among the social groups was experienced during this period according to the evidence of the tombs. The two-tier grave found at Toppo Daguzzo is an example of elite groups growth. On the top level, nearly 10 fractured skeletons have been found without any grave objects, while at the lower level eleven burials were found accompanied by different valuable pieces: 6 males with bronze weapons, 4 females with beads and a child. The Middle Bronze Age in Northern Italy was characterised by the Terramare culture.

The Recent Bronze Age, known as the Sub-Apennine period in Central Italy, is a frame of time when sites relocated to defended locations. At this time settlement hierarchy obviously appeared in cities such as Latium and Tuscany.

The Final Bronze Age is the period during which the majority of the Italian peninsula was united in the Proto-Villanovan culture. Pianello di Genga is an exception to the small cemeteries characterized for the Proto-Villanovan culture. More than 500 burials were found in this cemetery which is known for its two centuries of usage by different communities.

=== Polada culture ===
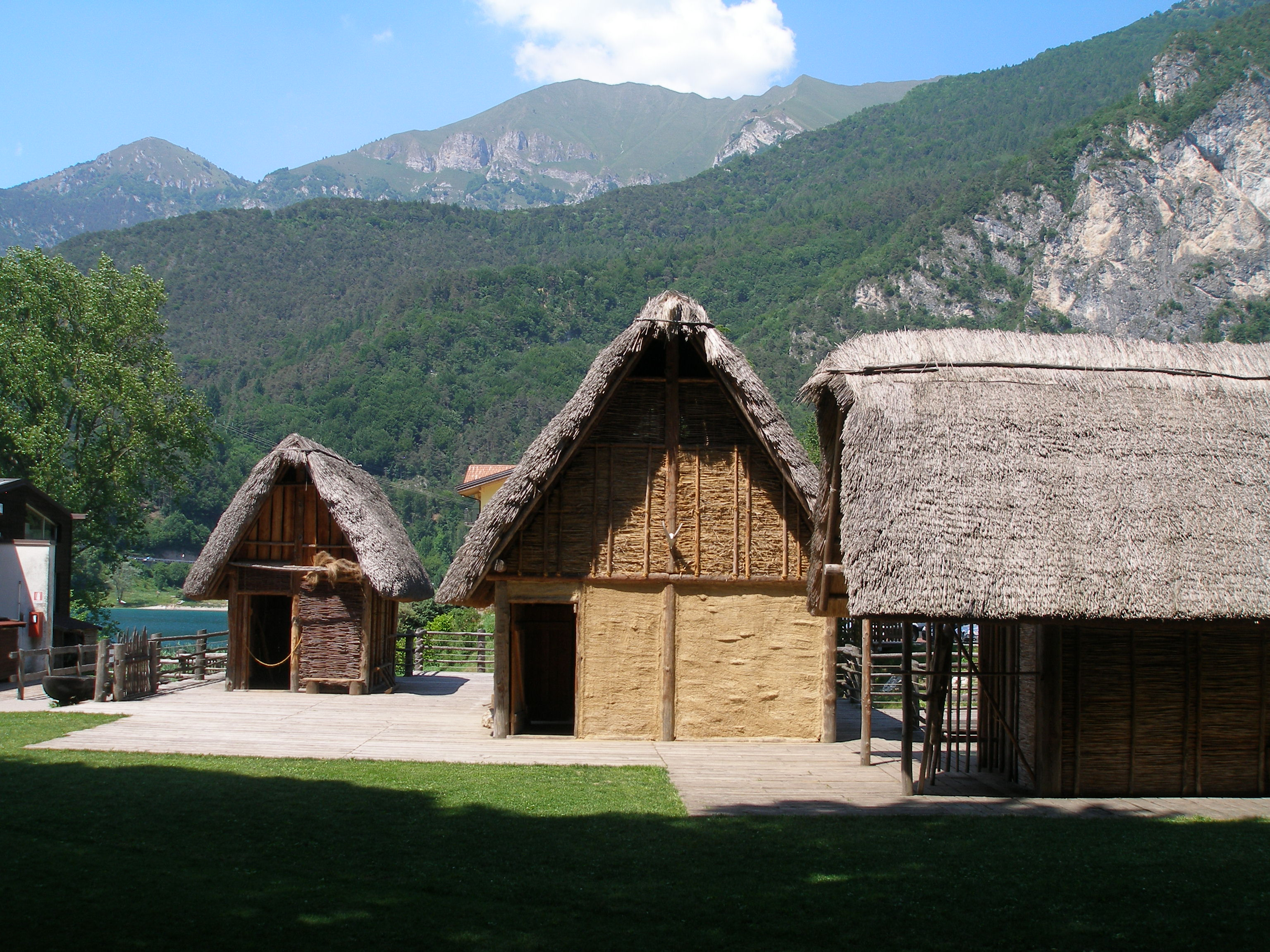
Reconstructed lake settlement at Ledro, northern Italy, Polada culture

The Polada culture (Polada is a locality near Brescia) was a cultural horizon extended from eastern Lombardy and Veneto to Emilia and Romagna, formed in the first half of 2nd millennium BC perhaps for the arrival of new people from the transalpine regions of Switzerland and Southern Germany.

The settlements were usually made up of stilt houses; the economy was characterized by agricultural and pastoral activities, hunting and fishing were also practiced as well as the metallurgy of copper and bronze (axes, daggers, pins etc.). Pottery was coarse and blackish.

It was followed in the Middle Bronze Age by the facies of the pile dwellings and of the dammed settlements.

=== Nuragic civilization ===
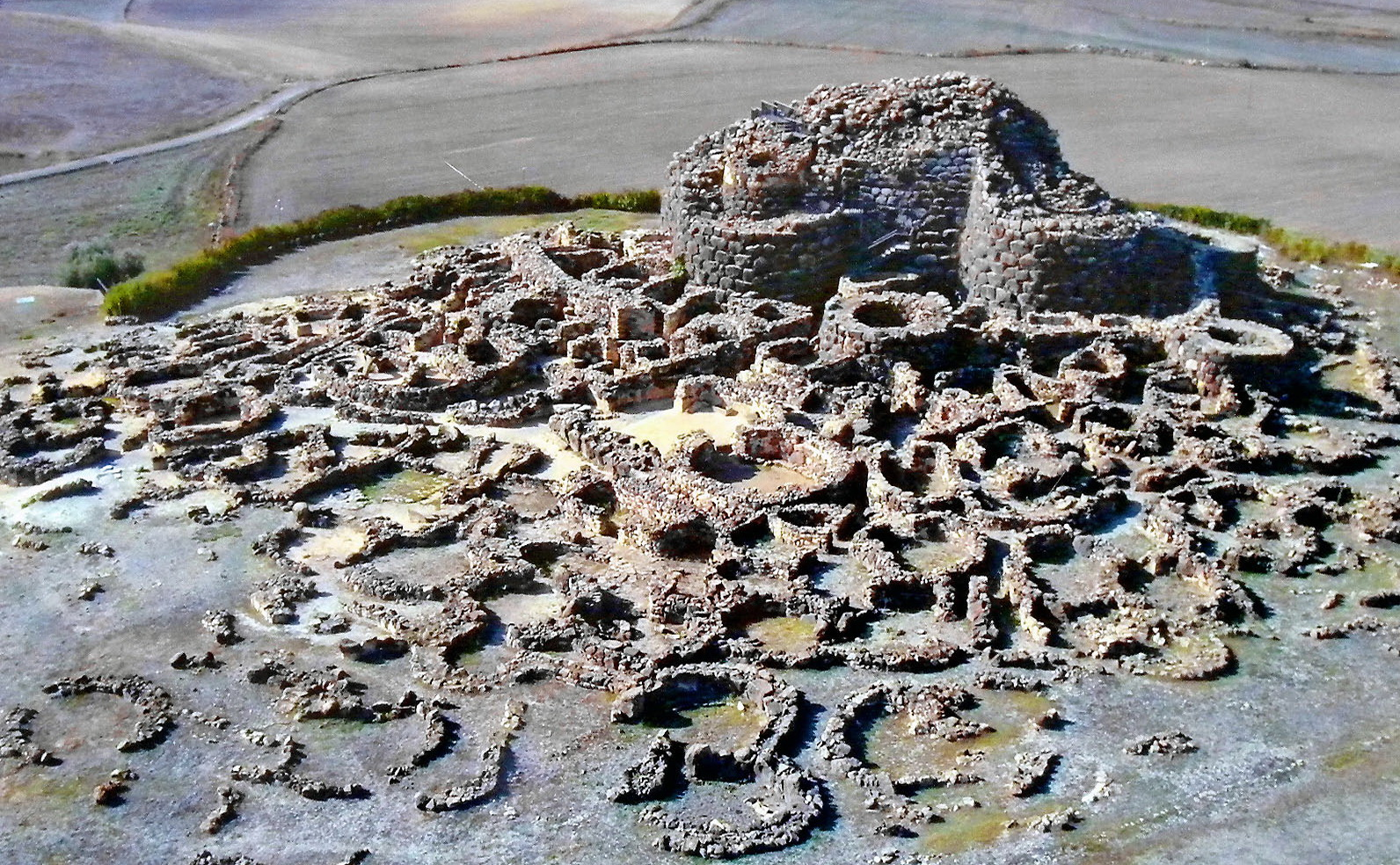
Nuraghe village of Su Nuraxi

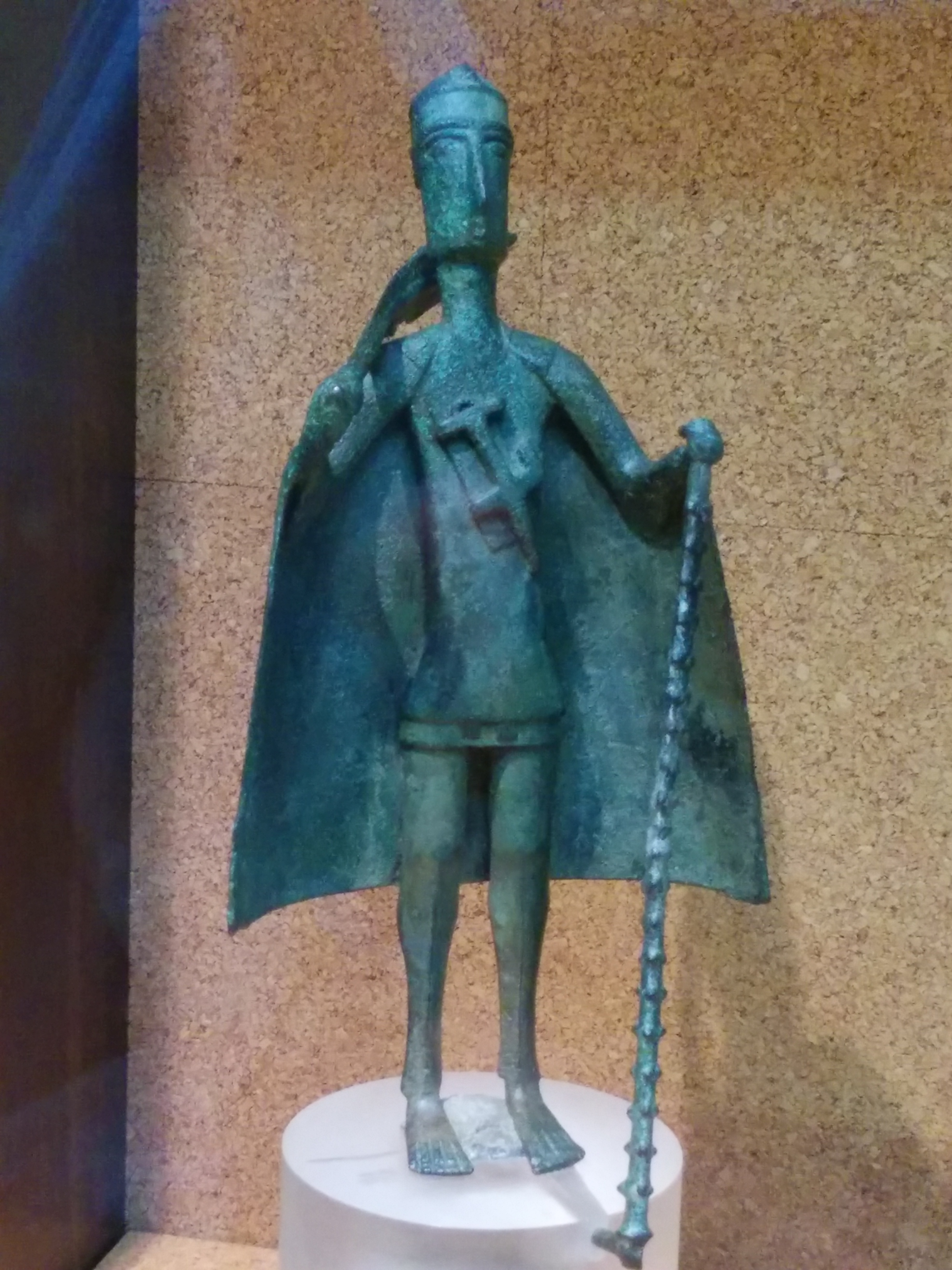
A Sardinian bronze statuette, perhaps portraying a tribal chief. Cagliari, Museo Archeologico Nazionale.

Located in Sardinia (with ramifications in southern Corsica), the Nuragic civilization, who lasted from the early Bronze Age (18th century B.C.) to the second century A.D. when the island was already Romanized, evolved during the Bonnanaro period from the preexisting megalithic cultures that built dolmens, menhirs, more than 2,400 Domus de Janas and also the imponent altar of Monte d'Accoddi.

It takes its name from the characteristic Nuraghe. The nuraghe towers are unanimously considered the best-preserved and largest megalithic remains in Europe. Their effective use is still debated; while most scholars considered them as fortresses, others see them as temples.

A warrior and mariner people, the ancient Sardinians held flourishing trades with the other Mediterranean peoples. This is shown by numerous remains contained in the nuraghe, such as amber coming from the Baltic Sea, small bronze figures portraying African beasts, oxhide ingots and weapons from Eastern Mediterranean, Mycenaean ceramics. It has been hypothesized that the ancient Sardinians, or part of them, could be identified with the Sherden, one of the so-called People of the Sea who attacked ancient Egypt and other regions of eastern Mediterranean.

Other original elements of the Sardinian civilization include the temples known as "Holy wells", dedicated to the cult of the holy waters, the Giants' graves, the Megaron temples, several structures for juridical and leisure functions and numerous bronze statuettes, which were discovered even in Etruscan tombs, suggesting a strong relationships between the two peoples. Another important element of this civilization are the Giants of Mont'e Prama, perhaps the oldest anthropomorphic statues of the western Mediterranean sea.

=== Sicily ===
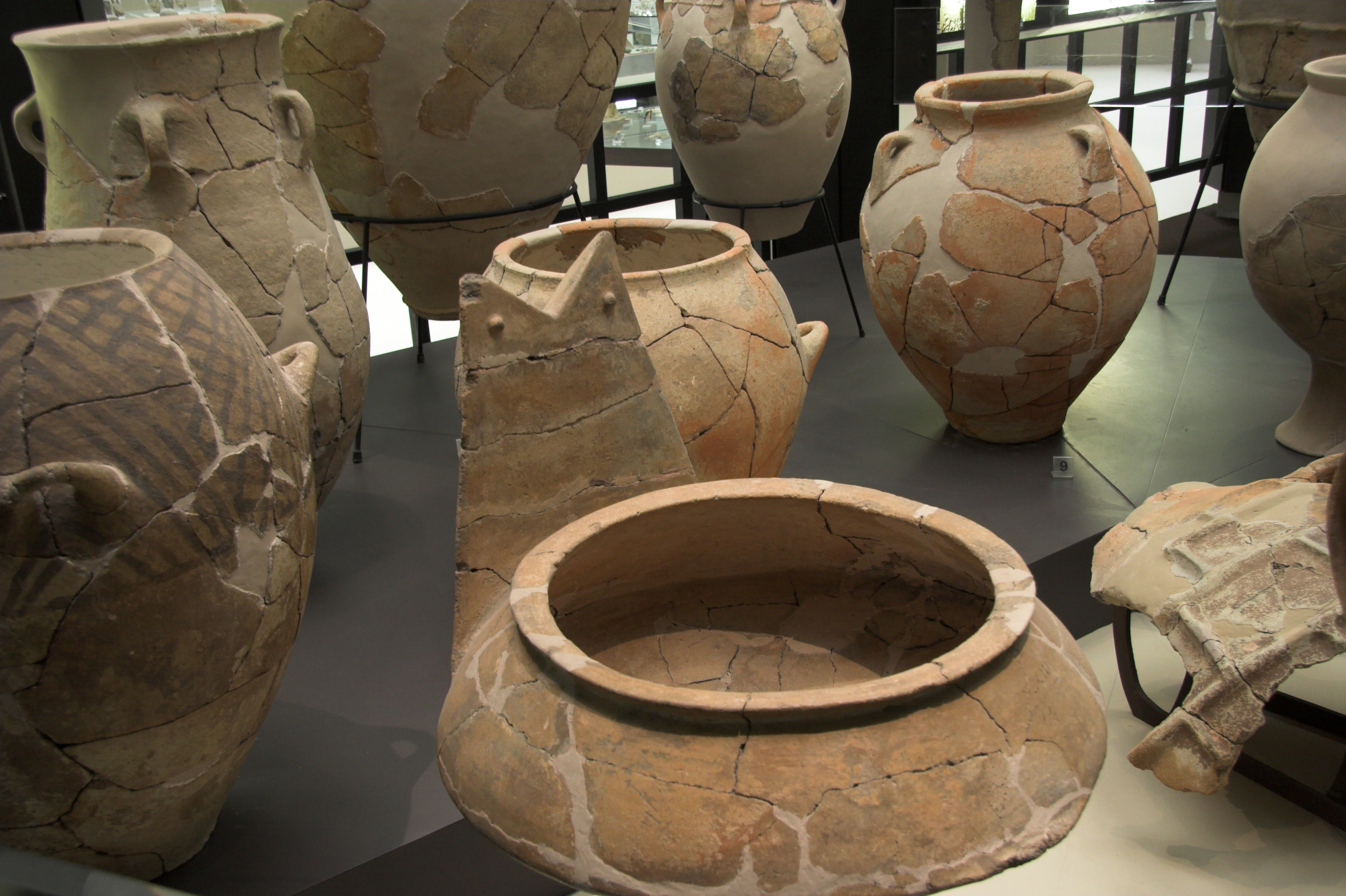
Thapsos culture pottery

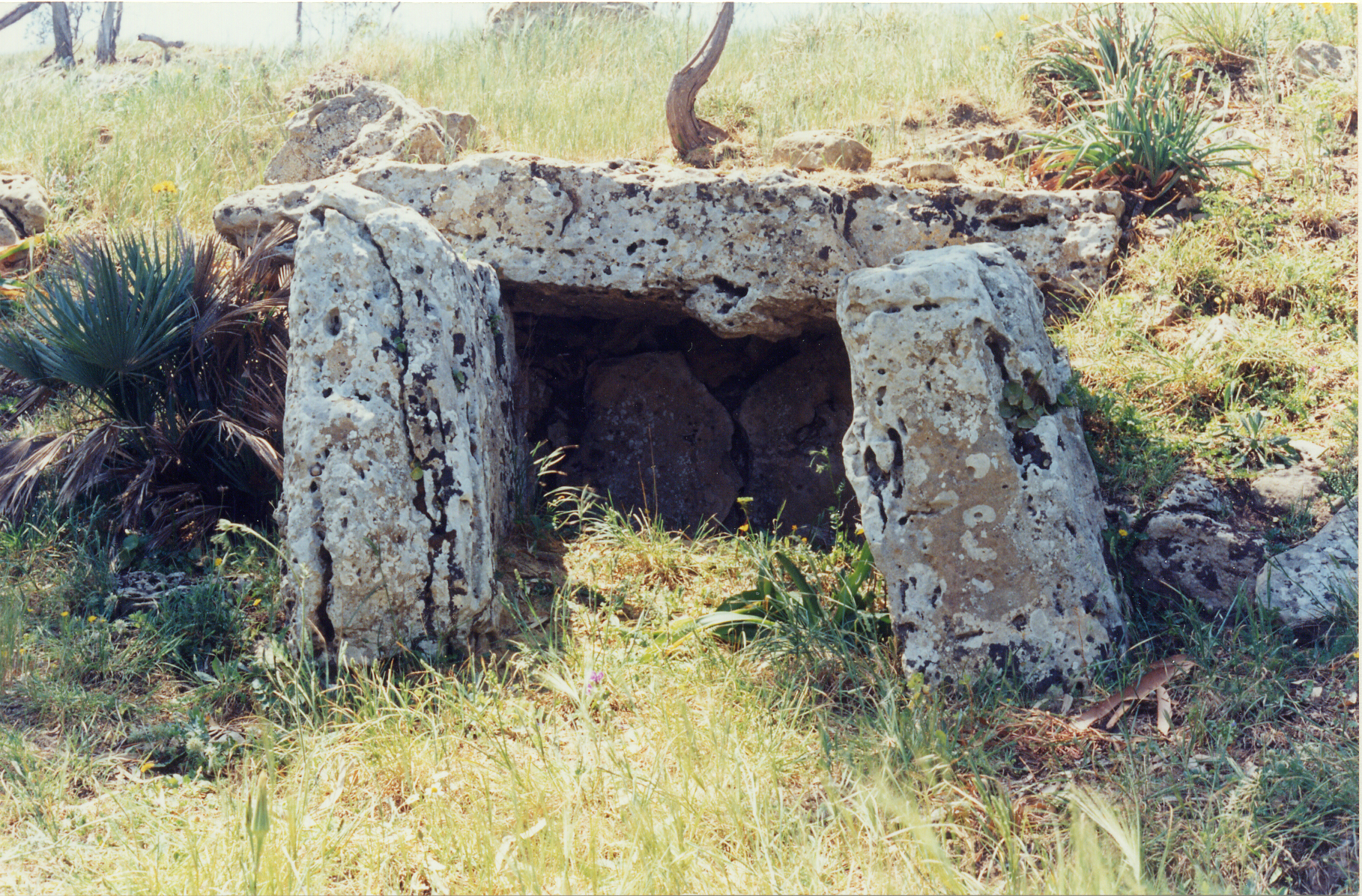
Dolmen located in Monte Bubbonia Sicily

Among the most important cultural expressions born in Sicily during the Bronze Age the cultures of Castelluccio (Ancient Bronze Age) and of Thapsos (Middle Bronze Age) are worth noting. Both originated in the southeastern part of the island. In these cultures, in particular in the Castelluccio phase, there are obvious influences from the Aegean Sea, where the Helladic civilization was flourishing.

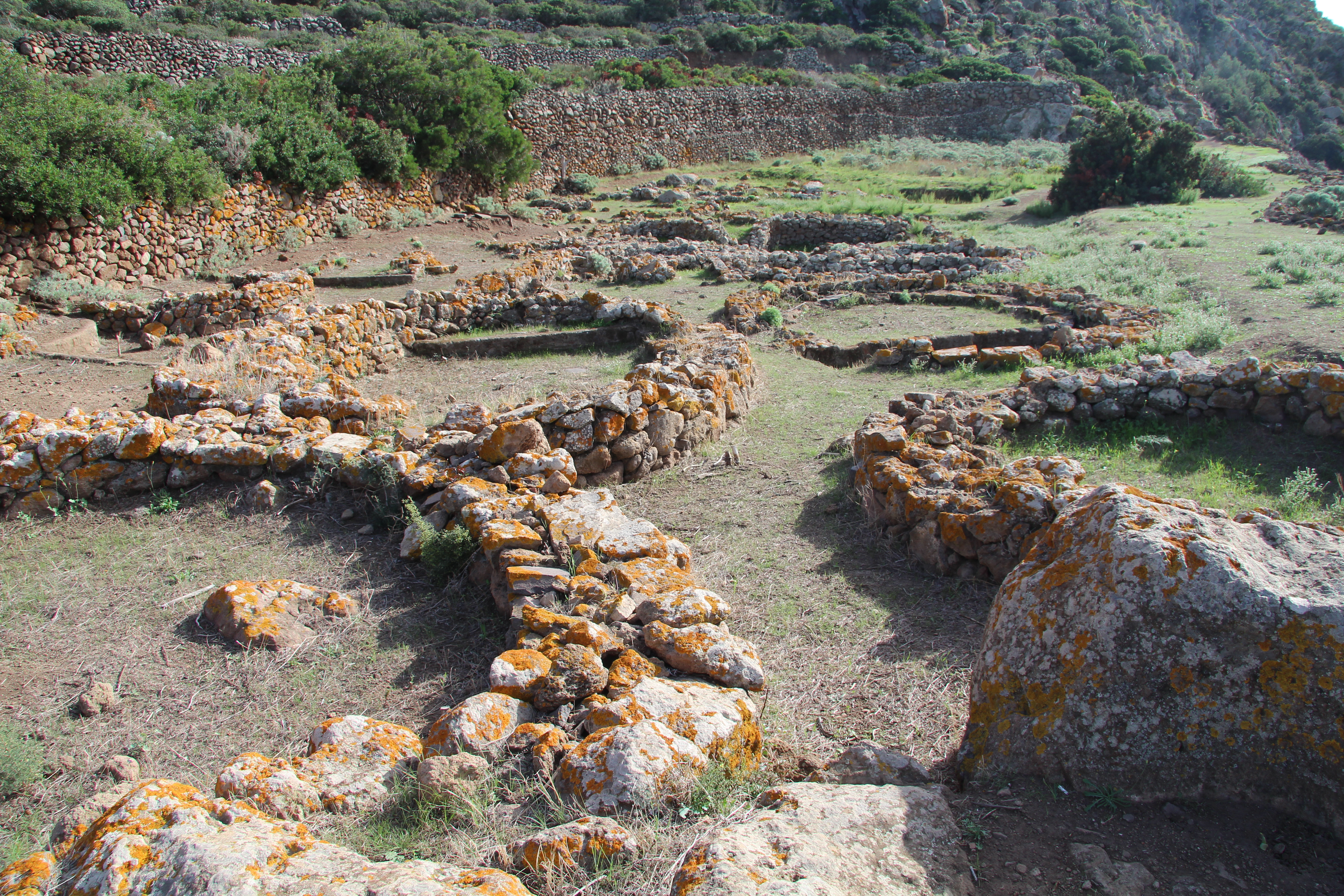
Village of Capo Graziano, Filicudi

Some small monuments date back to this phase, used as tombs and found almost everywhere, both inland and along the coasts of this region.

Belonging to a western (Iberian-Sardinian) type is the Bell Beaker culture known from sites on the northwestern and southwestern coasts of Sicily, previously occupied by the Conca d'Oro culture, while in the late Bronze Age there are signs in northeastern Sicily of cultural osmosis with the people of the peninsula that led to the appearance of Proto-Villanovan culture at Milazzo, perhaps linked to the arrival of Sicels.

The nearby Aeolian Islands hosted the flourishing of the Capo Graziano and Milazzo cultures in the Bronze Age, and subsequently that of Ausonio (divided into two phases, I and II).

=== Palma Campania culture ===
The Palma Campania culture took shape at the end of the third millennium BCE and represents the Early Bronze Age of Campania. It is named for the locality of Palma Campania where the first findings were made.

Many villages belonging to this culture were buried under volcanic ash after an eruption of Mount Vesuvius that took place around or after 2000 BCE.

=== Apennine culture ===
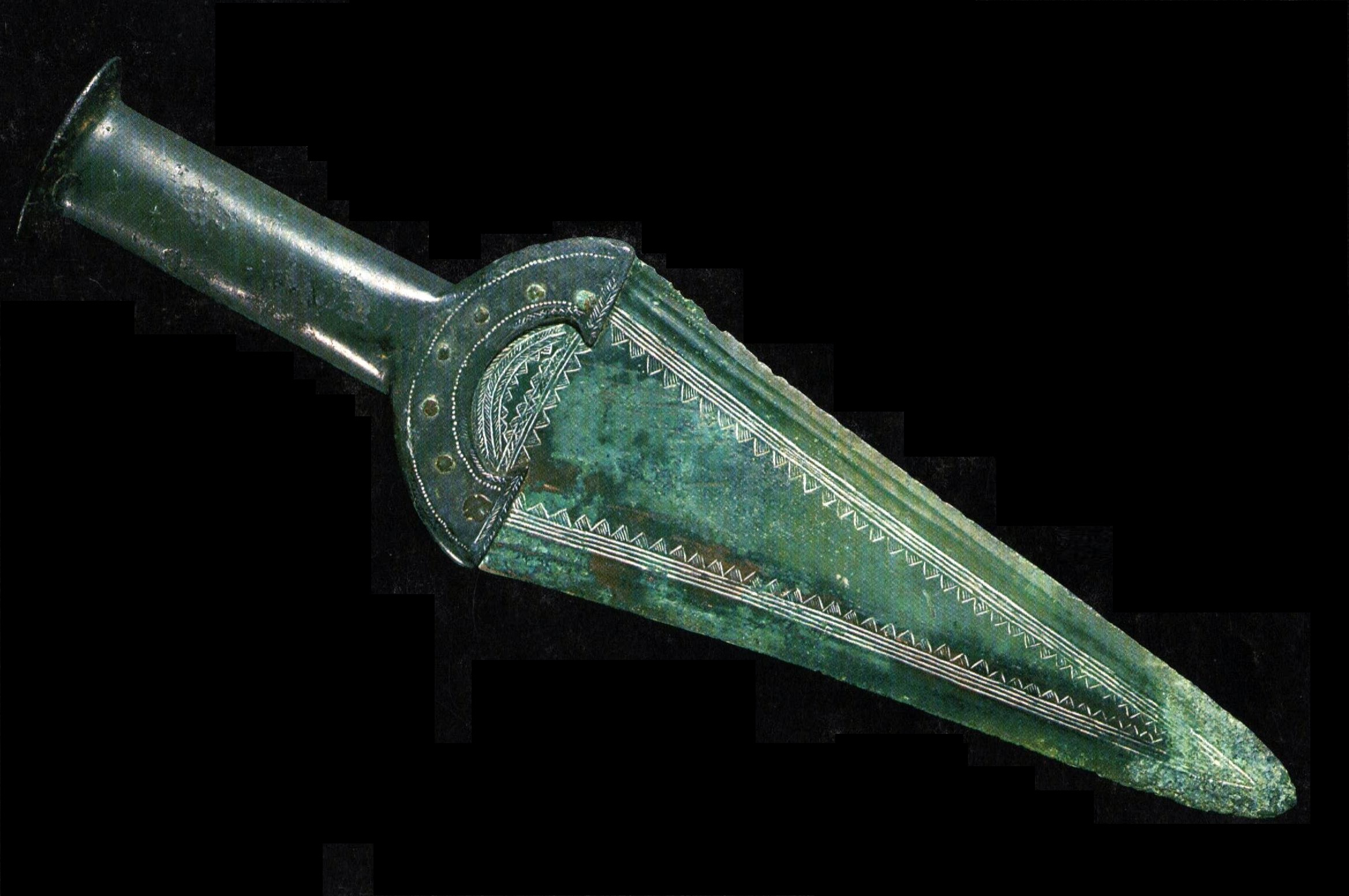
Early Bronze Age dagger from Italy

The Apennine culture is a cultural complex of central and southern Italy that, in its broadest sense (including the preceding Protoapennine B and following Subapennine facies), spans the Bronze Age. In the narrower sense more commonly used today, it refers only to the later phase of the Middle Bronze Age in the 15th and 14th centuries BCE.

The people of the Apennine culture were, at least in part, cattle herdsmen grazing their ungulates over the meadows and groves of mountainous central Italy, including on the Capitoline Hill at Rome, as shown by the presence of their pottery in the earliest layers of occupation. The primary picture is of a population that lived in small hamlets located in defensible places. There is evidence that herdsmen, when traveling between summer pastures, built temporary camps or lived in caves and rock shelters. However, their range was not confined to the hills, nor was their culture confined to herding cattle, as shown by sites like Coppa Nevigata, a well-defended and somewhat sizeable coastal site where a variety of subsistence strategies were practiced alongside advanced industries such as dye production.

=== Terramare ===
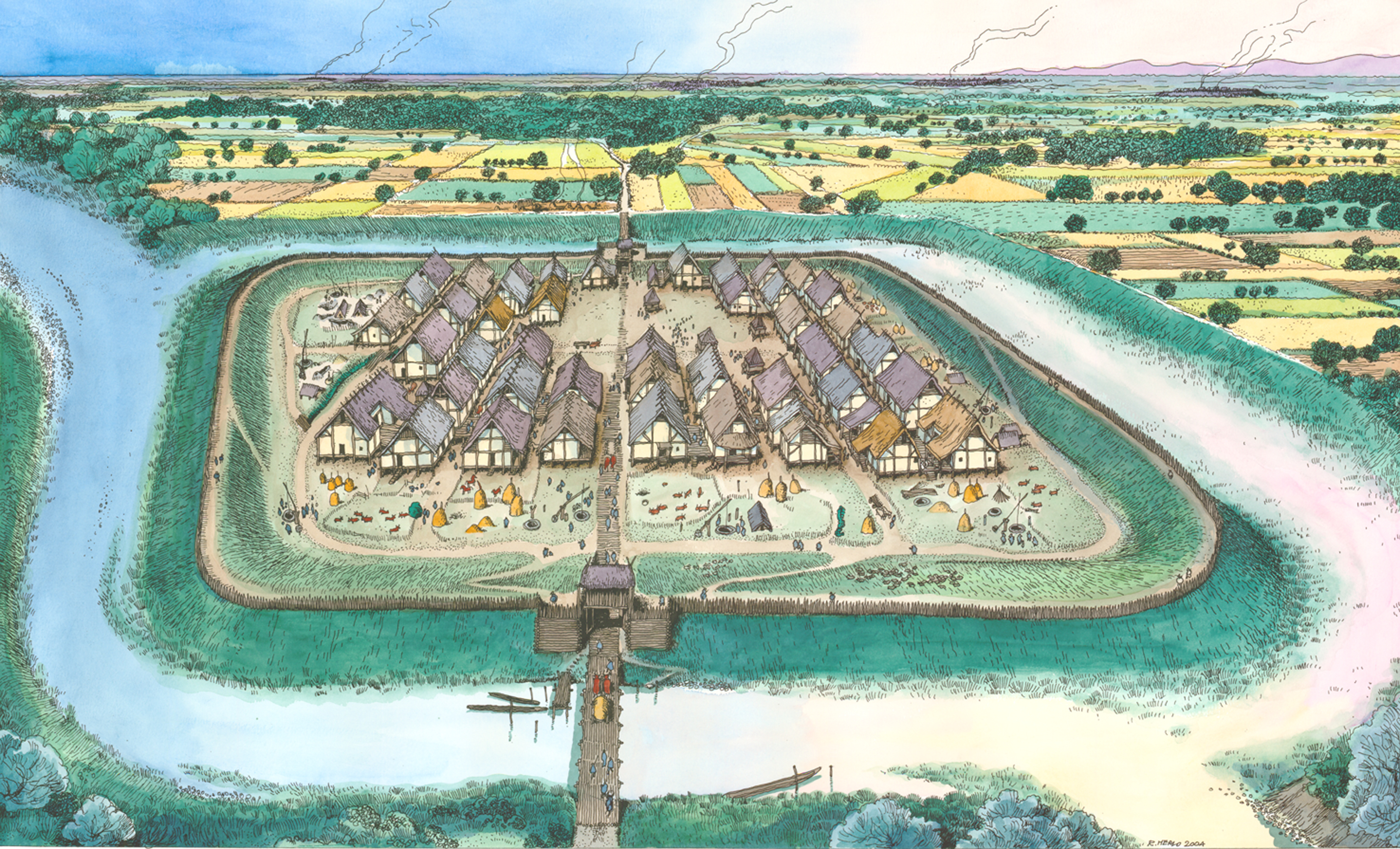
Illustration of a Terramare settlement

The Terramare was a Middle and Recent Bronze Age culture, between the 16th and the 12th centuries B.C., in the area of what is now Pianura Padana (specially along the Panaro river, between Modena and Bologna). Their total population probably reached an impressive peak of more than 120,000 individuals near the beginning of the Recent Bronze Age. In the early period they lived in villages with an average population of about 130 people living in wooden stilt houses: they had a square shape, built on land but generally near a stream, with roads that crossed each other at right angles. Over the lifetime of the Terramare culture, these settlements developed into stratified zones with larger settlements of up to 15-20Ha (approximately 1500-2000 people) surrounded by smaller villages. Especially in the later period, the proportion of settlements that were fortified approaches 100%.

Around the 12th century BC, the Terramare system collapsed, the settlements were abandoned, and the populations moved southward, where they mingled with the Apennine peoples. Some also hypothesize that the crisis and subsequent depopulation of the Hungarian Plain, around 1200 BC, may have triggered a large-scale migration toward the south. This massive influx of people, they suggest, could have placed pressure on the already ecologically strained Terramare society, contributing to its eventual collapse. More recently, Italian archaeologist Andrea Cardarelli has suggested that Dionysius of Halicarnassus’s account of the Pelasgians preserves a pre-Roman Italic mytho-historical tradition recalling the collapse of the Terramare culture. He rejects any ethnic continuity between Terramare populations and Pelasgians, arguing that Dionysius superimposed a Greek ethnic identity on an earlier Italic tradition. He notes parallels between the narrative and archaeological evidence of environmental degradation, prolonged drought, social conflict and population displacement around the 12th century BC.

=== Castellieri ===
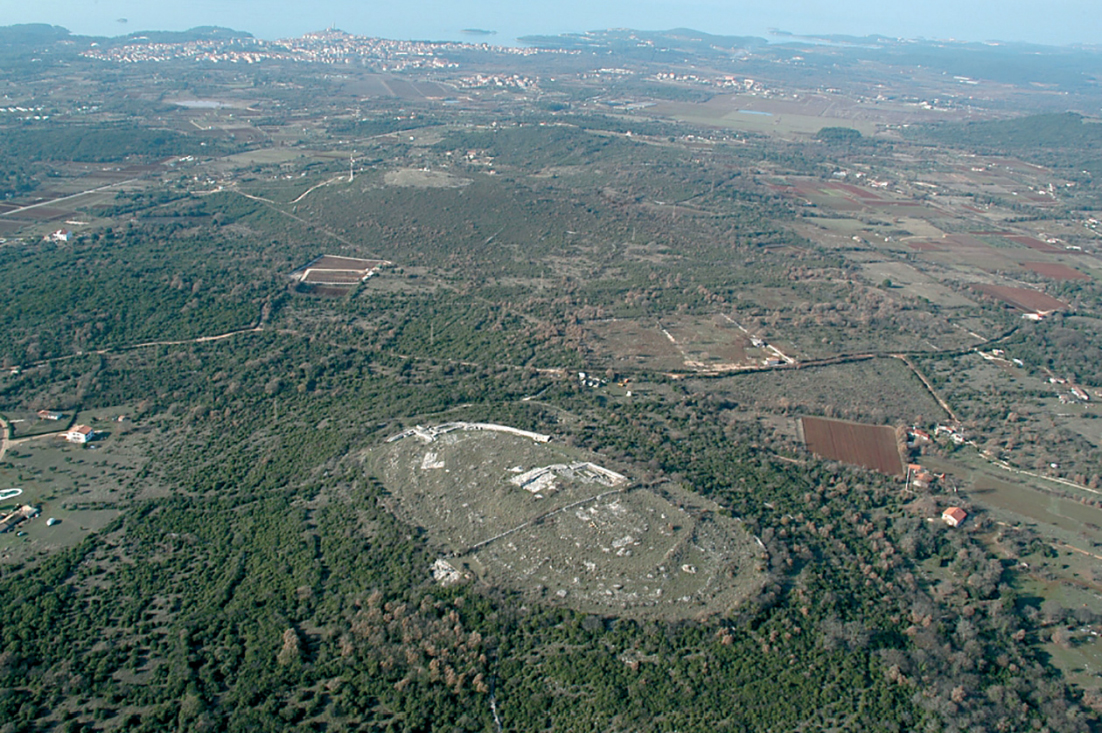
Castelliere of Monkodonja

The Castellieri culture developed in Istria during the developed Early and Middle Bronze Age, and later expanded into Friuli, the modern Venezia Giulia, Dalmatia and the neighbouring areas. It lasted for more than a millennium, from the 15th century BC until the Roman conquest in the third century BC. It takes its name from the fortified boroughs (Castellieri, Friulian cjastelir) which characterized the culture.

The ethnicity of the Castellieri civilization is uncertain, although it was most likely of Pre-Indoeuropean stock, coming from the sea. The first Castellieri were indeed built along the Istrian coast and show a similar Cyclopean masonry which is also characterizing in the Mycenaean civilization at the time.The best researched Castelliere in Istria is Monkodonja near Rovinj. Hypotheses about an Illyrian origin of the people are not confirmed.

The Castellieri were fortified settlements, usually located on hills or mountains or, more rarely (such as in Friuli), in plains. They were constituted by one or more concentric series of walls, of rounded or elliptical shape in Istria and Venezia Giulia, or quadrangular in Friuli, within which was the inhabited area.

Some hundred Castellieri have been discovered in Istria, Friuli, and Venezia Giulia, such as that of Leme, in west-central Istria, of Elerji, near Muggia, of Monte Giove near Prosecco (Trieste) and San Polo, not far from Monfalcone. However, the largest castelliere was perhaps that of Nesactium, in southern Istria, not far from Pula.

=== Canegrate culture ===
The Canegrate culture developed from the mid-Bronze Age (13th century BC) until the Iron Age in the Pianura Padana, in what is now western Lombardy, eastern Piedmont and Ticino. It takes its name from the township of Canegrate where, in the 20th century, some fifty tombs with ceramics and metal objects were found. It represents the first migratory wave of the proto-Celtic population from the northwest part of the Alps that, through the Alpine passes, had already penetrated and settled in the western Po valley between Lake Maggiore and Lake Como (Scamozzina culture). They brought a new funerary practice—cremation—which supplanted inhumation.

Canegrate terracotta is very similar to that known from the same period north to the Alps (Provence, Savoy, Isère, Valais, the area of Rhine-Switzerland-eastern France). The members of the culture have been described as a warrior population who had descended to Pianura Padana from the Swiss Alps passes and the Ticino.

=== Proto-Villanovan culture ===
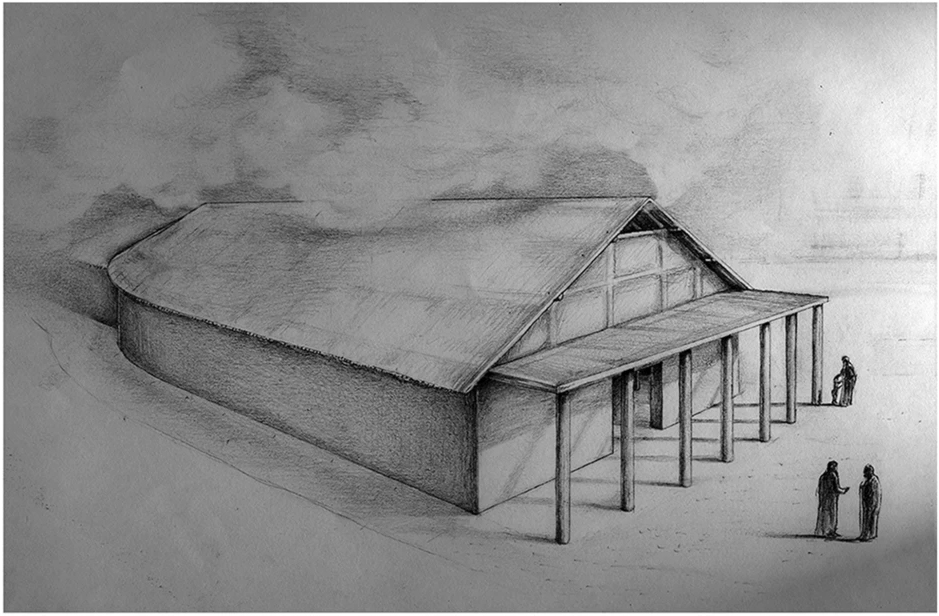
Late Bronze Age temple at Roca Vecchia, Proto-Villanovan culture

It was a culture of the end of the Bronze Age (12th-10th century BC), widespread in much of the Italian Peninsula and north-eastern Sicily (including the Aeolian Islands), characterized by the funeral ritual of incineration. The ashes of the deceased were placed into biconical urns decorated with geometric patterns. Elite graves containing jewellery, bronze armour and horse harness fittings were separated from ordinary graves, showing for the first time the development of a highly hierarchical society, so characteristic of Indo-European cultures. Their settlements were often located on the top of the hills and protected by stone walls.

Some scholars have hypothesized that the dispersal of the population, following the collapse of the Terramare system around 1150 BC, contributed to the development of subsequent cultural formations, including the Proto-Villanovan communities. In the region surrounding Rome, this tradition subsequently developed into the Latial Culture, which is generally regarded as representing one of the earliest cultural foundations of Roman society.

=== Luco-Meluno culture ===
The Luco-Meluno culture emerged during the transitional period between the Bronze Age and Iron Age, and occupied Trentino and part of South Tyrol. It was succeeded in the Iron Age by the Fritzens-Sanzeno culture.

== Iron Age ==
=== Villanova culture ===
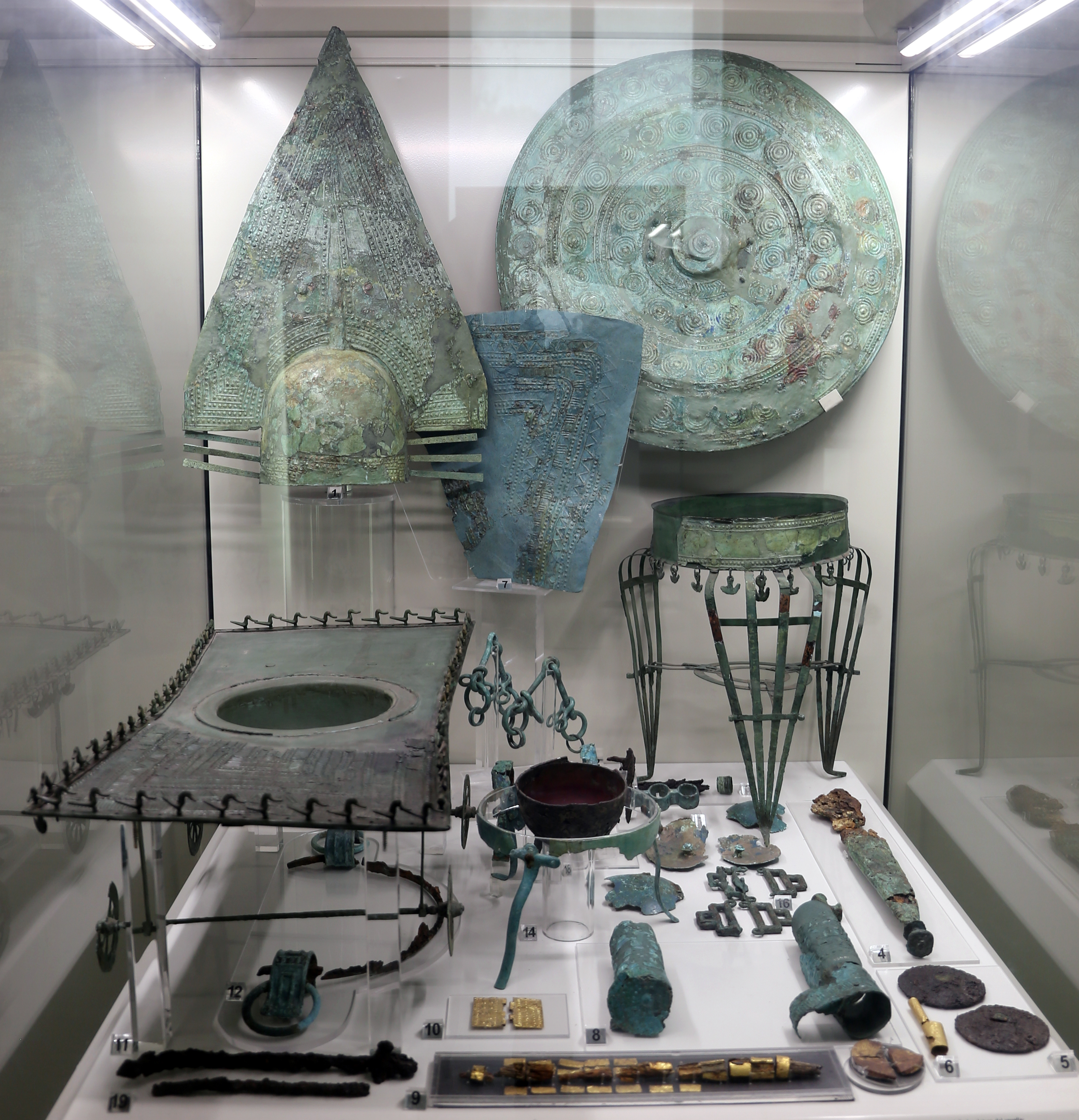
Grave goods from an elite Villanovan tomb, 8th century BC.

The name of this Iron Age civilization derives from a locality in the frazione Villanova of Castenaso, Città metropolitana di Bologna, in Emilia, where a necropolis was discovered by Giovanni Gozzadini in 1853–1856. It succeeded the Proto-Villanovan culture during the Iron Age in the territory of Tuscany and northern Lazio and spread in parts of Romagna, Campania and Fermo in the Marche, and it is regarded as the earliest phase of the Etruscan civilization.

The main characteristic of the Villanovans (with some similarities with the Proto-Villanovan period of the late Bronze Age) were cremation burials, in which the deceased's ashes were housed in bi-conical urns and buried. The burial characteristics relate the Villanovan culture to the Central European Urnfield culture (c. 1300–750 BCE) and the successive Hallstatt culture.

The Villanovans were initially devoted to agriculture and animal husbandry, with a simplified social order. Later, specialized craftsmanship activities such as metallurgy and ceramics caused the accumulation of wealth, which resembled the appearance of social stratification.

=== Latial culture ===
The Latial culture ranged approximately over ancient Old Latium. The Iron Age Latial culture coincided with the arrival in the region of a people who spoke Old Latin. The culture was likely therefore to identify a phase of the socio-political self-consciousness of the Latin tribe, during the period of the kings of Alba Longa and the foundation of the Roman Kingdom.

=== Este culture ===
The Este culture or Atestine culture was an Iron Age archaeological culture existing from the late Italian Bronze Age (10th-9th century BCE, proto-Venetic phase) to the Roman period (1st century BCE). It was located in the present territory of Veneto in Italy and derived from the earlier and more extensive Proto-Villanovan culture. It is also called "civilization of situlas", or paleo-Venetic.

=== Golasecca culture ===
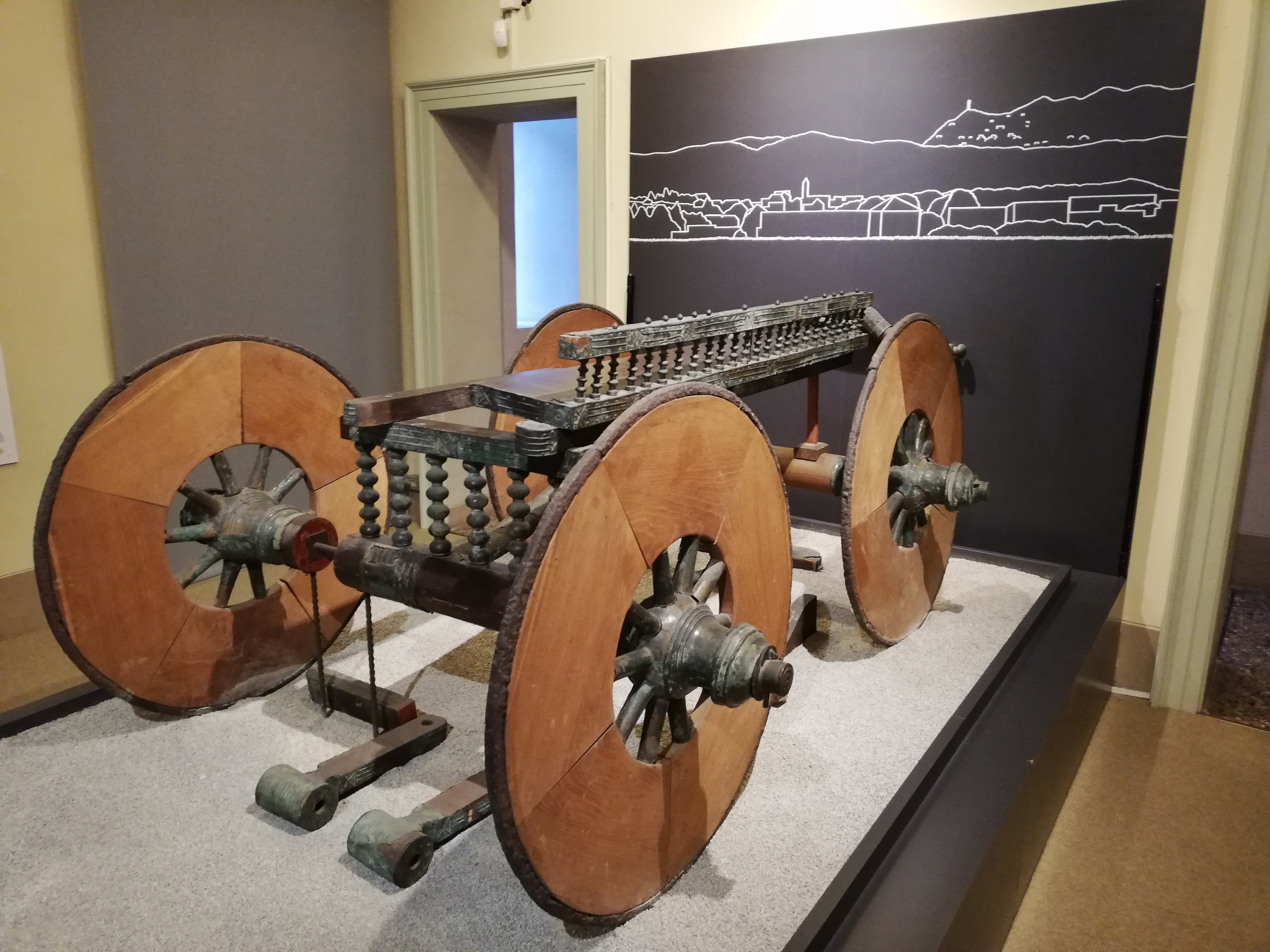
Funerary wagon, Golasecca culture

The Golasecca culture emerged during the early Iron Age in the northwestern Po plain. It takes its name from Golasecca, a locality next to the Ticino where, in the early 19th century, abbot Giovanni Battista Giani excavated its first findings (some fifty tombs with ceramics and metal objects). Remains of the Golasecca culture span an area of roughly 20,000 square kilometers south of the Alps and between the Po, Sesia and Serio rivers, dating from the ninth to the fourth century BCE.

Their origins can be directly traced from that of Canegrate and to the so-called Proto-Golasecca culture (12th–10th centuries BC). The Golasecca culture traded with the Etruscans and the Hallstatt culture on the north, later reaching the Greek world (oil, wine, bronze objects, ceramics and others) and northern Europe (tin and amber from the Baltic coast).

In a Golasecca culture tomb in Pombia, researchers found the oldest known remains of common hop beer in the world.

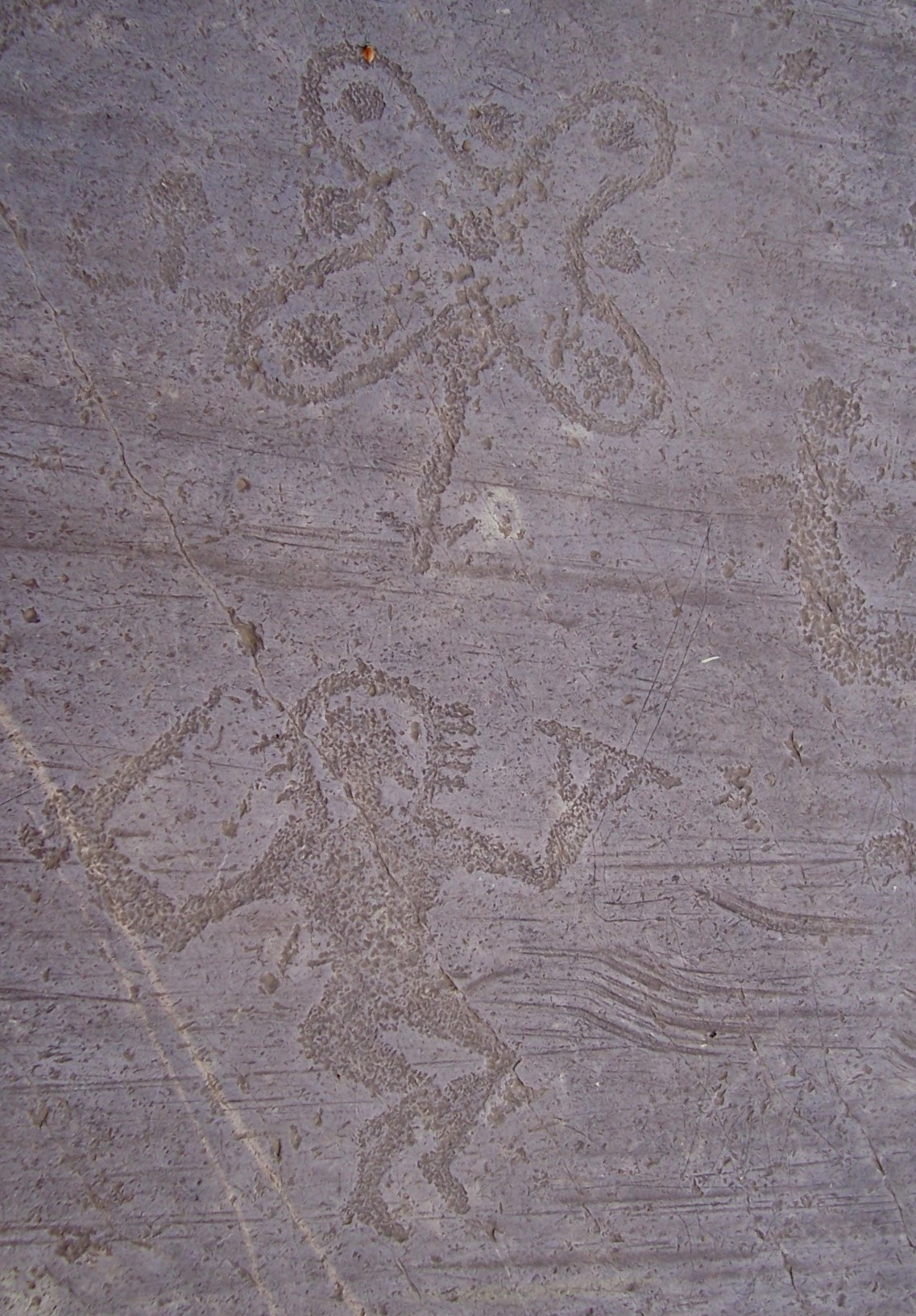
Rock drawings in Val Camonica.

=== Fritzens-Sanzeno culture ===
The Fritzens-Sanzeno culture is attested in the late Iron Age, from the sixth to the first century BC, in the Alpine region of Trentino and South Tyrol; in the period of maximum expansion it reached into the Engadin region.

=== The Camuni ===
The Camuni were an ancient people of uncertain origin (according to Pliny the Elder, they were Euganei; according to Strabo, they were Rhaetians) who lived in Val Camonica – in what is now northern Lombardy – during the Iron Age, although human groups of hunters, shepherds and farmers are known to have lived in the area since the Neolithic.

They reached the height of their power during the Iron Age due to the presence of numerous iron mills in Val Camonica. Their historical importance is, however, mostly due to their legacy of carved rocks, c. 300,000 in number, which date from the Palaeolithic to the Middle Ages.

== Pre-Roman period ==
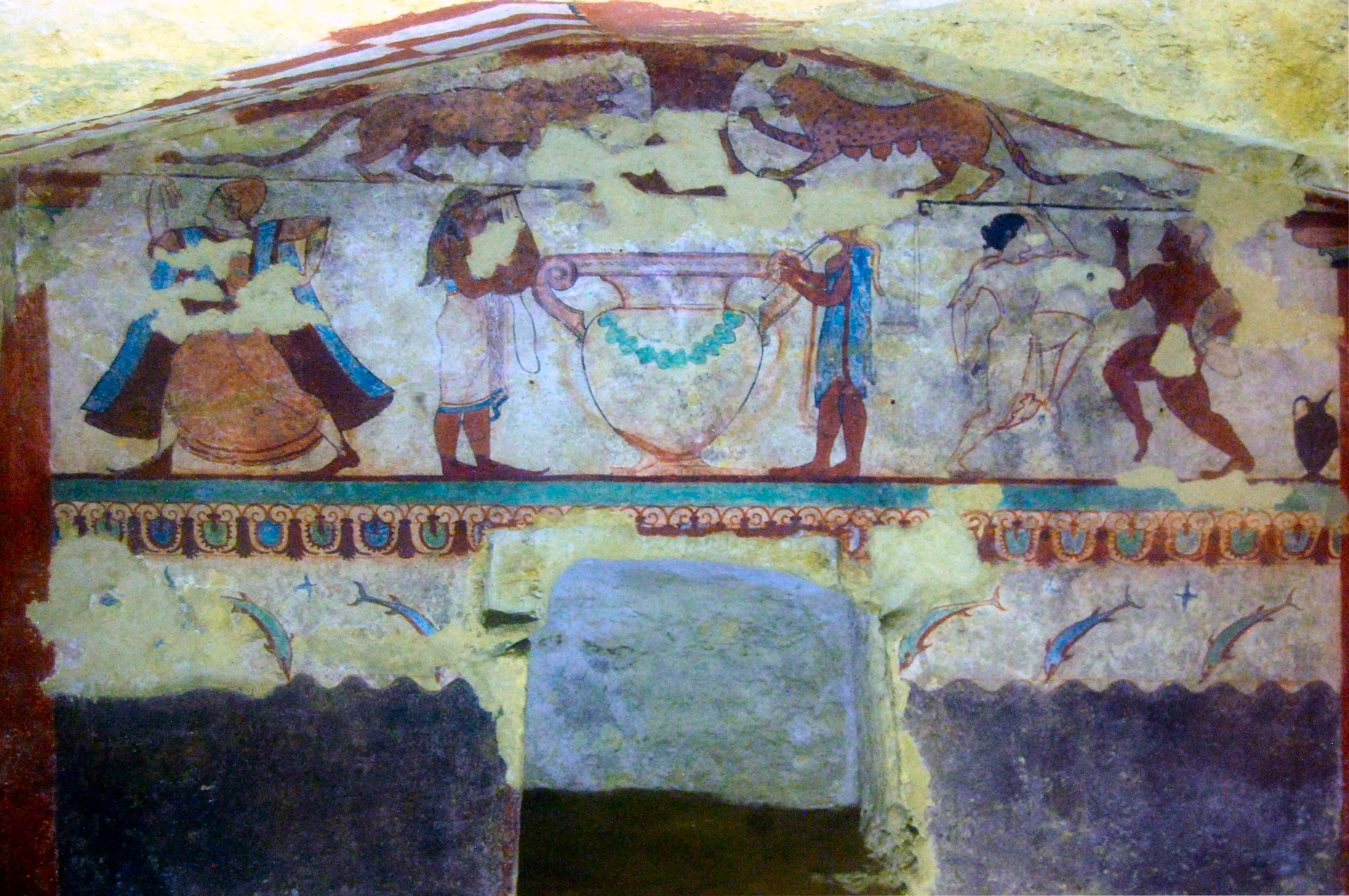
Etruscan fresco from Tarquinia

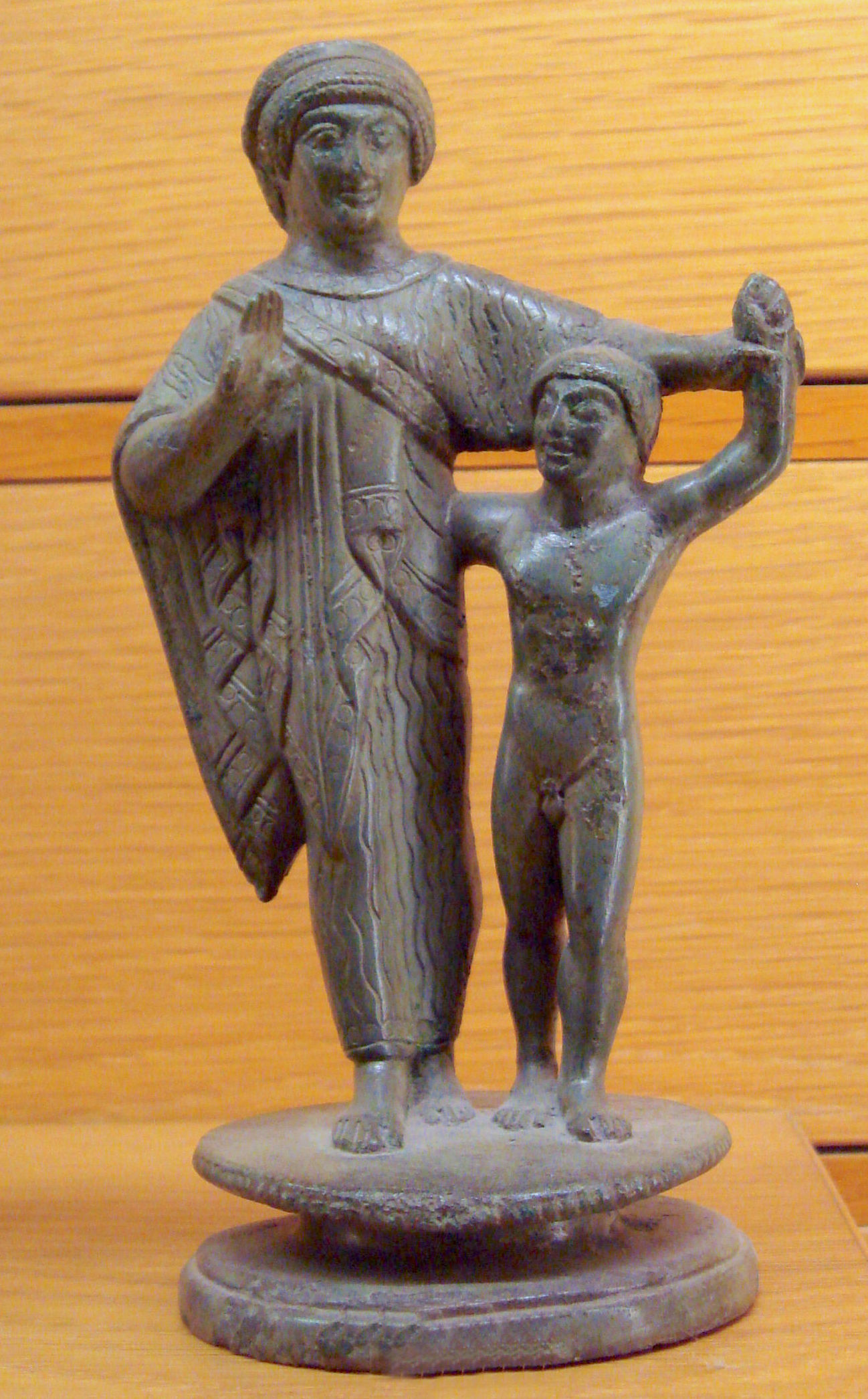
Etruscan mother and child, 500–450 BC

Among the populations of pre-Roman Italy, the most notable were the Etruscans who, starting from the eighth century BC, created a refined civilization which largely influenced Rome and the Latin world. The origins of this non-Indo-European people, which first settled on the Tyrrhenian coast of central Italy and later expanded to northern Italy (Emilia in particular) and Campania, are uncertain.

Other peoples living in northern Italy included the Ligurians (an Indo-European people who lived in what is now Liguria, southern Piedmont and the southern French coast), the Lepontii, Insubres, Orobii and other Celtic tribes in Piedmont and Lombardy, and the Veneti of north-eastern Italy. In the peninsula, alongside the Etruscans, lived numerous tribes, mostly of Indo-European origin:

- the Umbri in Umbria and northern Abruzzo
- The Latins, who created the Roman civilization
- Sabellians, Falisci, Volsci and Aequi in Latium
- Piceni in the Marche and north-east Abruzzo
- Samnites in southern Abruzzo, Molise and Campania
- Daunians, Messapii and Peucetii (forming the Apulian or Iapygian confederation) in Apulia
- Lucani and Bruttii in the southern tips of the peninsula
- The Sicels, Elymians and Sicani in Sicily
- The Nuragic peoples, still inhabiting Sardinia

Later, other peoples settled in Italy, cohabiting with the previous inhabitants: new tribes of Celts in the north (Senones, Boii, Lingones etc.), the Greeks in coastal southern Italy, and the Phoenicians in parts of Sicily and Sardinia.

== See also ==
- Italic languages

== Sources ==
- Armstrong, Jeremy; Rhodes-Schroder, Aaron (2023). Adoption, adaptation, and innovation in pre-Roman Italy: paradigms for cultural change. Turnhout: Brepols. ISBN 9782503602325.
- Anati, Emmanuel (1964). La civiltà di Val Camonica. Milan: Il Saggiatore (casa editrice).
- Buti, G. Gianna-Devoto, Giacomo (1974), Preistoria e storia delle regioni d'Italia, Sansoni Università.
- Bietti Sestieri, Anna Maria (2010). L'Italia nell'età del bronzo e del ferro: dalle palafitte a Romolo (2200-700 a.C.) (in Italian). Carocci. ISBN 978-88-430-5207-3.
- Guasco, Delia (2006). Popoli italici: l'Italia prima di Roma (in Italian). Giunti. ISBN 978-88-09-04062-5.
- Peroni, Renato (2004). L'Italia alle soglie della Storia, Editori Laterza, ISBN 9788842072409.
- Piccolo, Salvatore (2013). Ancient Stones: The Prehistoric Dolmens of Sicily. Abingdon/GB, Brazen Head Publishing, ISBN 9780956510624.
