= Square-mouthed vases culture =

Neolithic culture in northern Italy

Square-Mouthed Vases culture
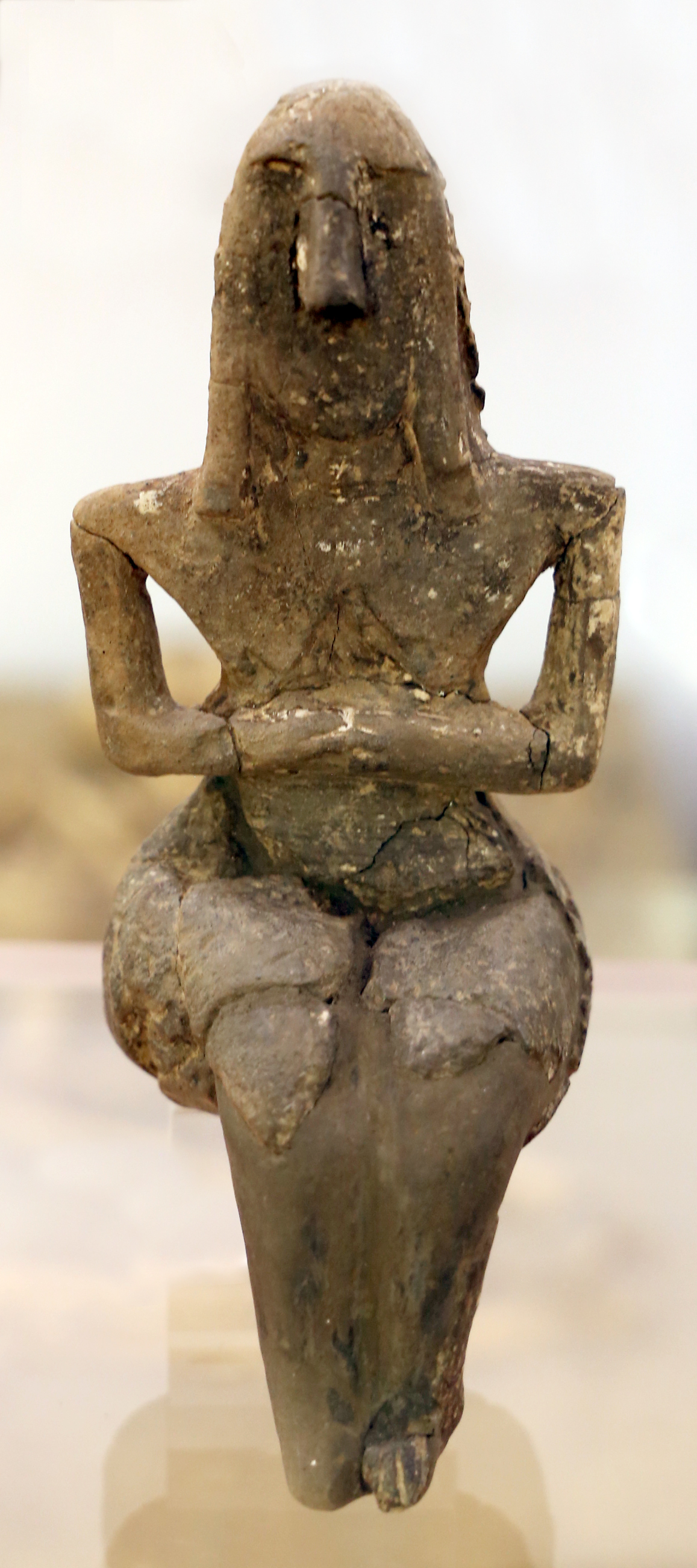
- The "Venus of Vicofertile", found in Vicofertile (Parma) in a tomb attributable to the VBQ culture
- Geographical range: North Italy
- Period: Middle Neolithic
- Dates: c. 5100 BC – 3800
- Preceded by: Danubian cultures, Vhò culture, Adriatic Impressed-Ware culture
- Followed by: Remedello culture

The Square-Mouthed Vases culture (Italian: Cultura dei Vasi à Bocca Quadrata or VBQ) is a culture of the Middle Neolithic period, widespread in northern Italy during the fifth millennium BC. The name comes from its characteristic type of vessel, which has a square mouthpiece instead of circular.

== Three time periods ==
The culture is divided into three different time periods, depending on the style of the pottery's decoration: the oldest is known as the Finale-Quinziano with pots being decorated by small incisions and graffiti; the middle period or Rivoli-Chiozza is characterized by meander and spiral decorations; while the most recent phase, the Rivoli-Castelnuovo, is typified by vessels with figures engraved and imprinted.

== Geographic spread ==
This culture shares a lot of features, including square-mouthed vases, with the Danubian cultures of the middle Danube valleys. The culture spread widely in northern Italy, penetrating deeply among local populations, and replacing the previous cultures, in a process which may not always have been peaceful. The typical elements of this culture (grave goods with polished axes, use of bow and arrow, cylindrical frames) are often found to suddenly supplant the pre-existing cultural groups. Sometimes elements have been assimilated as decorative features, e.g. in the Veneto and Trentino area. These cultural upheavals, occurring around 4000 BC, led to a strong unification of these territories, with a homogeneity of style in subsequent archaeological findings.

The people of this culture were very active in agriculture and trade. One of the main reasons for the development of the culture, was their vast flocks and herds, which gave mobility, resources, and the ability to adapt. The society engaged in both arable and pastoral forms of agriculture. A warrior component was behind the spread of the culture and its peoples. The leader of social groups was a farmer-shepherd-warrior; a family head who ran all the group's activities.
