= Remedello culture =

Culture during the Copper Age in Northern Italy

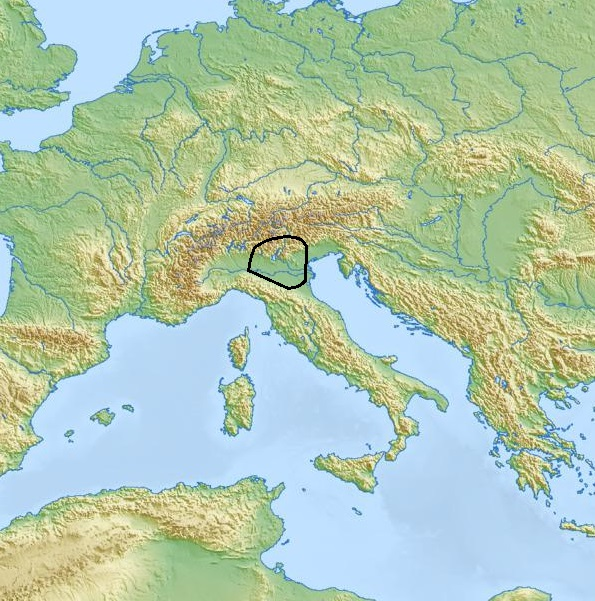
- Geographical range: North Italy
- Period: Chalcolithic
- Dates: 3400–2400 BCE
- Preceded by: Lagozza culture, Square-mouthed vases culture
- Followed by: Bell Beaker culture, Polada culture

The Remedello culture (Italian Cultura di Remedello) developed during the Copper Age (4th and 3rd millennium BCE) in Northern Italy, particularly in the area of the Po Valley. The name comes from the town of Remedello (Brescia) where several burials were discovered in the late 19th century.

== First excavations ==
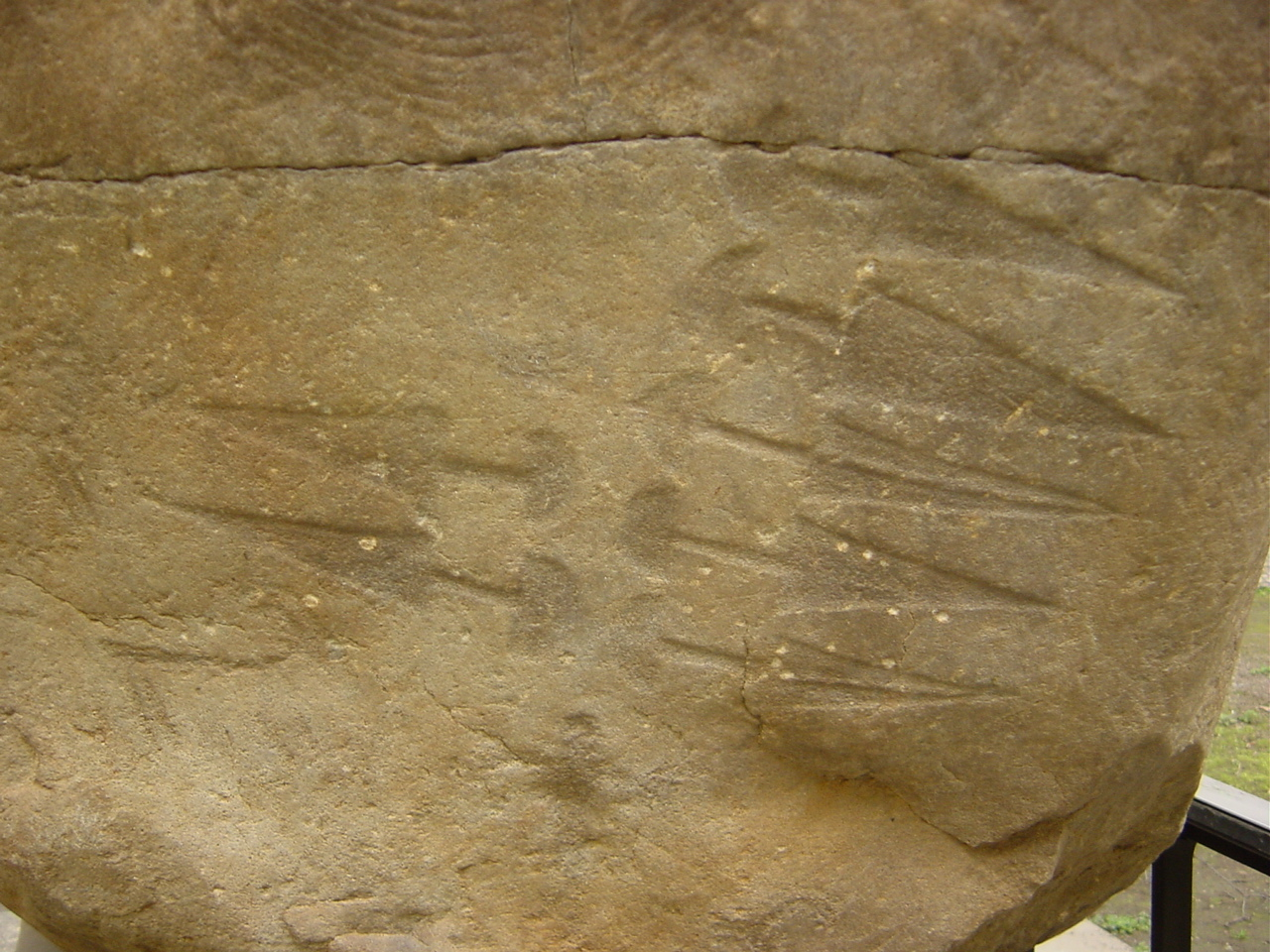
Engravings of Remedello-type daggers at Valcamonica

The first burials were discovered in the winter of 1884, the excavations were initiated by Gaetano Chierici, but, as a result of the low temperatures, he fell ill and died. The excavations continued under the direction of Giovanni Bandieri, who moved the relics to the Museum of Reggio Emilia.

== The burials ==
The Copper Age graves contained a single body in a crouching or supine position with the head facing north-west.

The male set was represented by arrows, stone daggers and polished stone axes, with a few tombs having axes and daggers or ornaments made of copper.

The female burials are accompanied by ceramic vessels or (in rare occasions) ornaments. The graves of children contained simple kits of flint stone.

Among the noteworthy items found noteworthy were extremely accurate works in flint stone such as axes and other weapons, and objects in copper and arsenical silver (arms, pins, pectorals, bracelets), all of them characterized by decorative elements of eastern origin.

== Genetics ==
C. Quiles (2021) gathered three ancient DNA results for the Remedello culture: two I2-L460, and one G2a2a. There is also some evidence for patrilocality.

== Chronology ==
Although most of the discovered tombs date to the Chalcolithic, burials from the Bronze Age and the Iron Age have also been recovered.

The Remedello culture has been recently periodized by scholars into two distinct historical periods both dating back to the Copper Age.

Remedello I : 3400 / 3200 BCE – 2800 BCE, or ancient Copper Age stage;

Remedello II: 2900 / 2800 BCE – 2400 BCE, or full Copper Age stage.

== Gallery ==
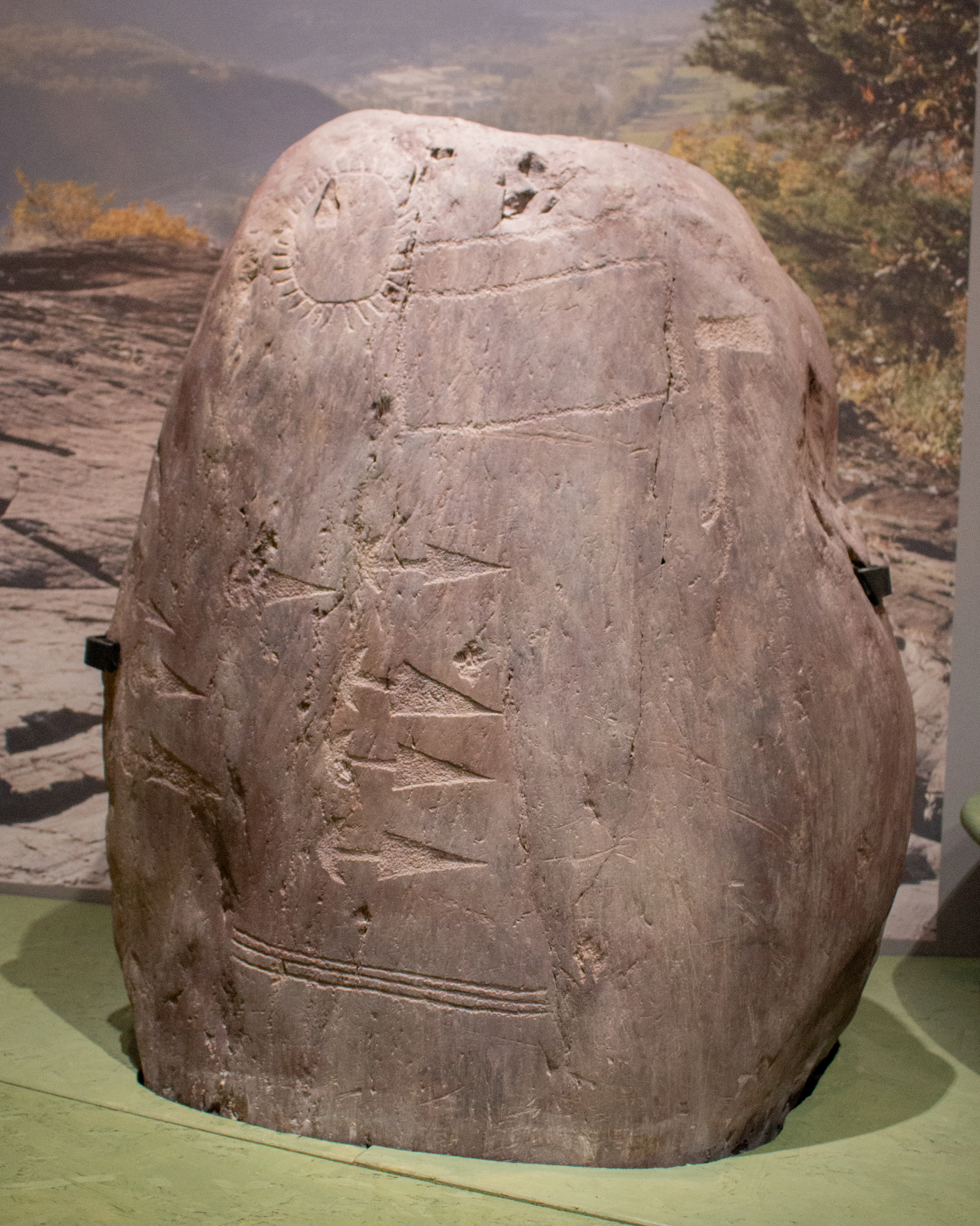
Engraved stone from the Italian alps, c. 2500 BC

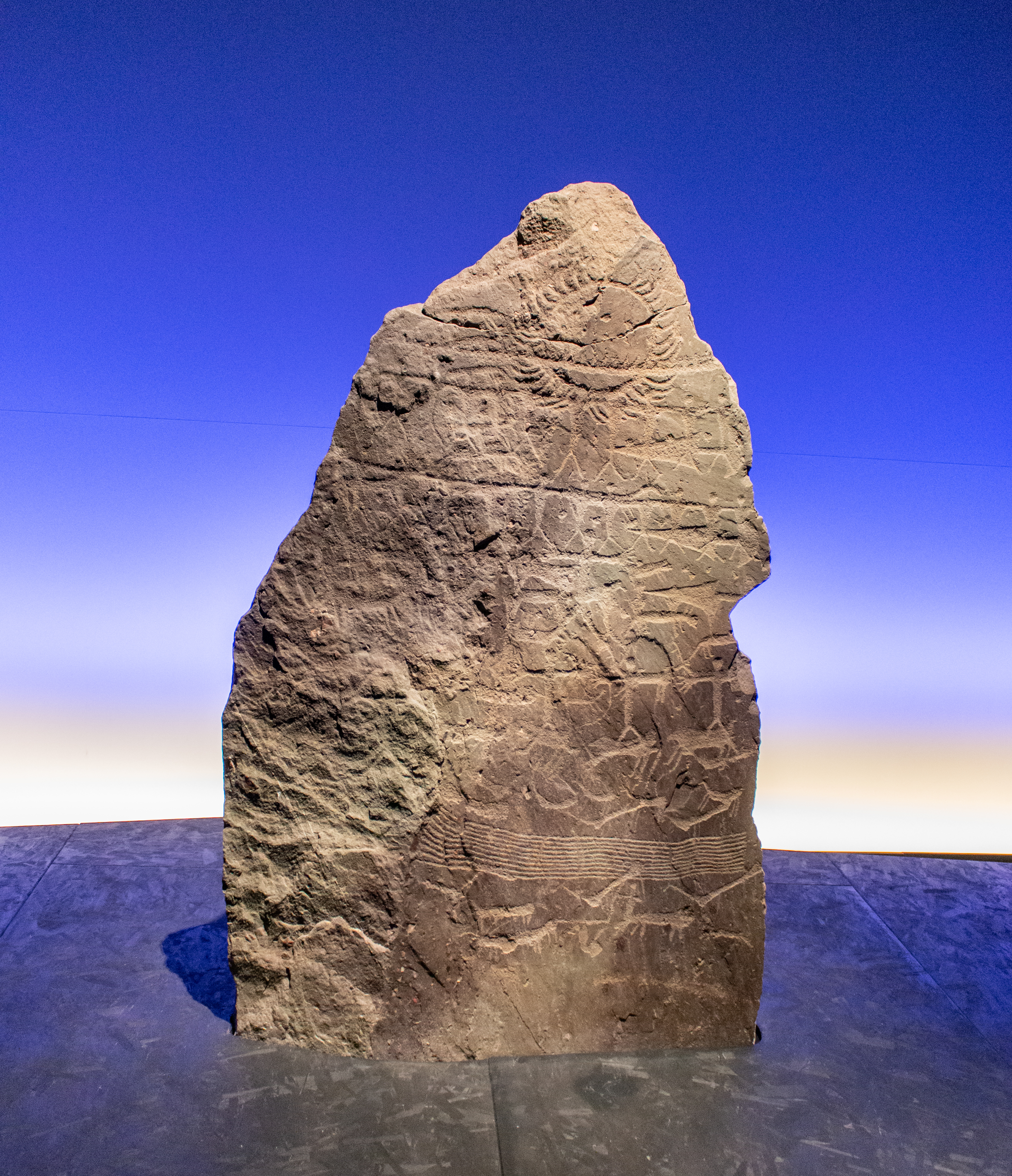
Engraved stone from the Italian alps

== See also ==
- Bagnolo stele
- Beaker culture
- Chalcolithic
- Prehistoric Italy
