= Capo Graziano culture =

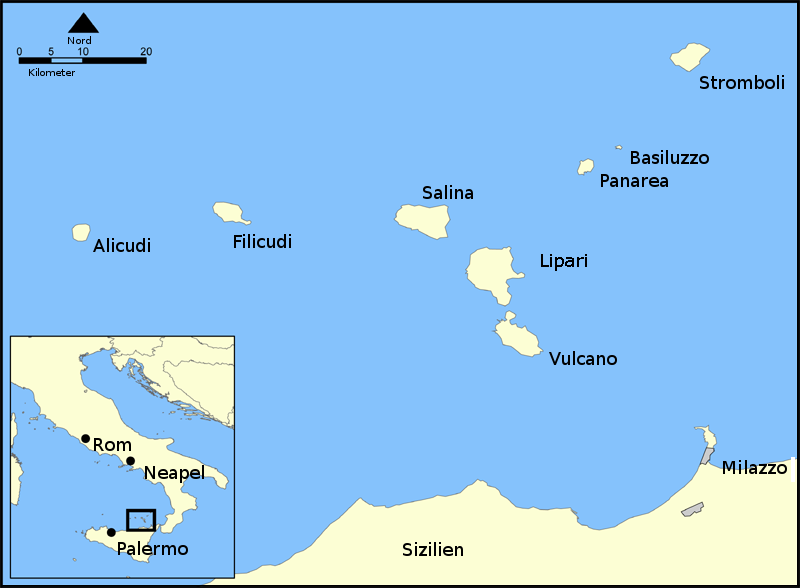
The Aeolian Islands

The Capo Graziano culture is an archaeological culture that was prevalent on the Aeolian Islands. According to prevailing opinion, it emerged at the beginning of the early Bronze Age, around 2200 BC, and lasted until approximately 1430 BC. The culture is named after Capo Graziano, a cape in the southeast of the island of Filicudi, where one of the most significant settlements of this culture was discovered.

== Chronology ==
The beginning of the Capo Graziano culture is generally believed to be around 2200 BC – however, a 2013 analysis of ^{14}C data suggests it may have begun slightly earlier – with the onset of the Early Bronze Age on the Aeolian Islands. It ended around 1430 BC or slightly earlier.

The Capo Graziano culture can be divided into two main phases:

- Capo Graziano I: ca. 2200–1800 BC
- Capo Graziano II: ca. 1800–1430 BC

The two phases are distinguished primarily by changes in ceramics and by the fact that during Capo Graziano II, settlements were very well-protected, while in the early phase they were located in unprotected places. While Capo Graziano I is generally considered part of the Early Bronze Age, Capo Graziano II is regarded by some authors as Middle Bronze Age (the first two phases of the Middle Bronze Age, MBA I and II). Other researchers now define the entire Capo Graziano culture as Early Bronze Age, with the Middle Bronze Age beginning only with the appearance of the subsequent Milazzese culture.

== Historical Development ==
After the Aeolian Islands became a significant center for widespread trade in Obsidian during the Neolithic due to their obsidian deposits, a period of economic, demographic, and cultural decline set in during the Copper Age, as metals began to replace obsidian as a material for tools. However, in the Bronze Age, there was a revival, likely due to the strategically advantageous location of the islands, as they controlled the Strait of Messina. Some settlements became transit points for long-distance trade. This is evidenced by numerous finds, including those of eastern Mediterranean origin, such as Mycenaean pottery and earlier fragments of Middle Helladic clay vessels. Conversely, artifacts – especially pottery – of the Capo Graziano culture have been found not only on the Aeolian Islands (including Stromboli) but also in some regions of Sicily (especially near Milazzo and around Palermo), as well as in Calabria and Campania (e.g., on the island of Vivara in the Gulf of Naples). New settlements, consisting of round to oval huts, emerged on all the main islands except Vulcano.

The Capo Graziano culture was succeeded around 1430 BC by the Milazzese culture, which is closely related to the Thapsos culture of Sicily. Since some settlements of the Capo Graziano culture continued into the Milazzese culture without being destroyed during the transition, it appears that the Capo Graziano culture did not end violently. Some characteristics of the culture persisted in the Milazzese culture.

== Settlements ==
New settlements were established on all the main Aeolian Islands except Vulcano. In the first phase of the Capo Graziano culture, these settlements were located in strategically advantageous but poorly protected places. They consisted of round to oval huts with stone bases that were slightly sunk into the ground. With the beginning of the second phase – the settlement at Capo Graziano on Filicudi likely in the first phase – the old settlements were abandoned, and new settlements were built in naturally well-protected locations. For instance, the old settlement on Lipari was located in the Contrada Diana plain (on the site of the modern town of Lipari) and was moved at the beginning of Capo Graziano II to the so-called Acropolis of Lipari. On Filicudi, older settlements at the harbor, on the narrow isthmus (Filo Braccio), were replaced by a naturally well-protected settlement on a terrace about 100 meters high at Capo Graziano.

The exploration of the settlement at Filo Braccio on Filicudi, inhabited during the first phase of the Capo Graziano culture, revealed food remains, mostly in the form of bone fragments. Analyses showed that these were remains of goats, pigs, cattle, fish, and shellfish. Archaeobotanical studies also identified grapevines (Vitis vinifera).

== Pottery ==
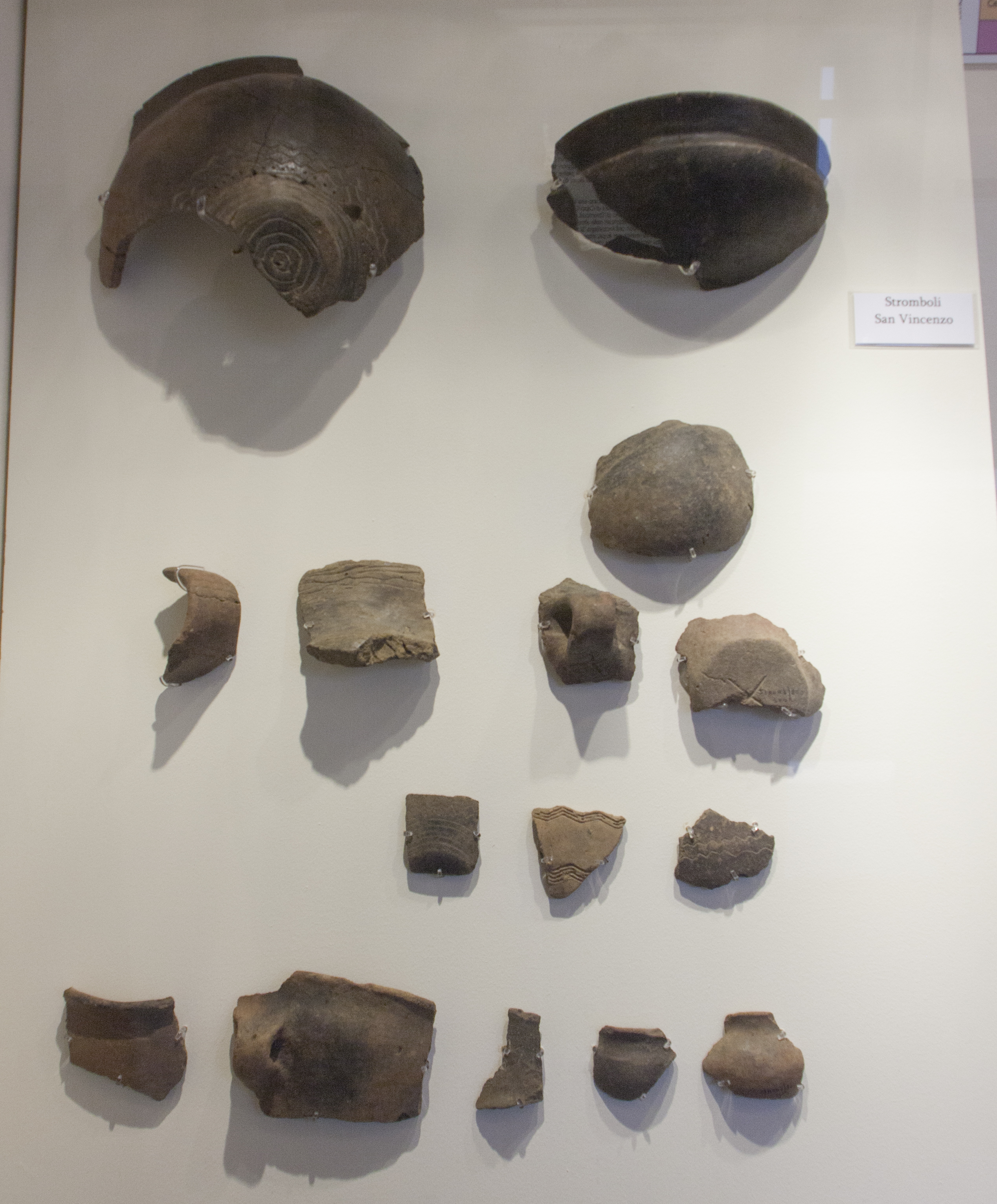
Pottery of the Capo Graziano culture from San Vincenzo, Stromboli

The early pottery of the Capo Graziano culture shows parallels in terms of vessel shapes and manufacturing techniques to the pottery of Early Helladic III Greece. The pieces are gray, sometimes dark brown, and are partially decorated with simple linear incisions. In the second phase, the pottery is incrusted and decorated with various incised designs.

Production sites for Capo Graziano pottery were located on Filicudi and Lipari, according to archaeometric and petrological clay analyses. To a lesser extent, pottery in the Capo Graziano style was also produced on the Sicilian peninsula near Milazzo and in the region of the Tropea promontory in Calabria. The latter made up about 20% of the pottery found on Stromboli. Pottery produced at Milazzo was found in small quantities on Filicudi, while the island itself exported larger amounts of undecorated utility ware to Milazzo and decorated pottery to Stromboli, which also produced its own pottery in Capo Graziano style in small quantities.

== Glass Industry ==
Starting from the Capo Graziano I period, glass was used as a raw material for ornaments on the Aeolian Islands. The glass used was imported from the eastern Mediterranean region in the form of flat slabs and then further processed in local workshops. The first finds of imported glass ornaments on the Aeolian Islands are from the late phase of Capo Graziano I and are therefore among the oldest of their kind in the central Mediterranean.

== Rites of the Dead ==
The settlement of Capo Graziano on Filicudi, along with the adjacent settlements on Salina and Lipari, was explored as early as the beginning of the 20th century by the then-priest of Lipari, Bernabò Brea, who discovered numerous burials. Some of these contained grave goods such as pottery vessels, which were used during the Capo Graziano culture as urns for cremations and were buried in urn fields. Unlike the settlement on Panarea, where no cemeteries from the Capo Graziano culture have been found so far, graves of the Capo Graziano culture have been discovered on Stromboli, but here, due to the lack of significant finds and the limited scope of the explorations, no precise conclusions could be drawn.
