= Cisalpine Gaul =

Roman province

Coordinates: 45°N 11°E

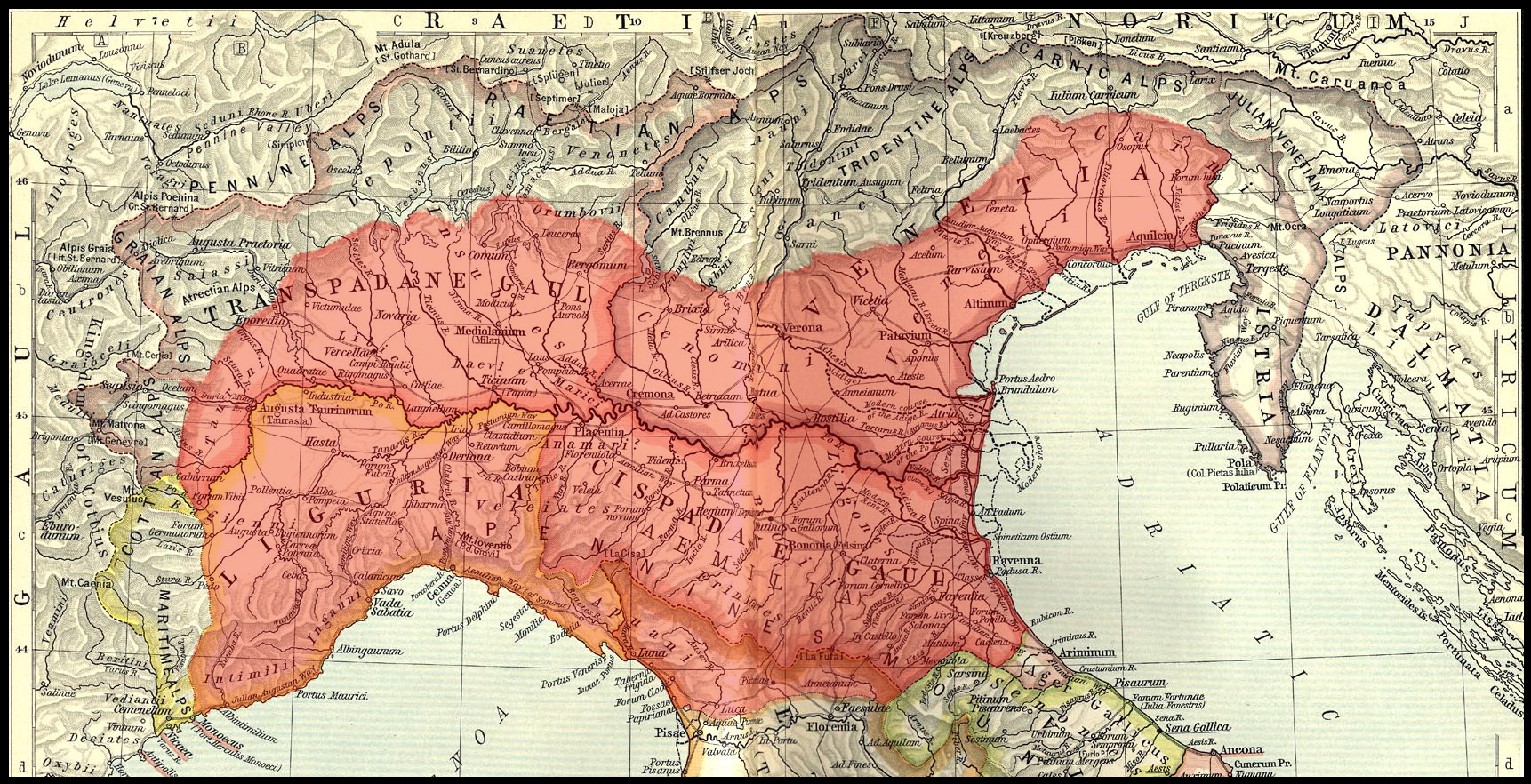
Cisalpine Gaul around 100 BC

Cisalpine Gaul (Latin: Gallia Cisalpina, also called Gallia Citerior or Gallia Togata) was the name given, especially during the 4th and 3rd centuries BC, to a region of land inhabited by Celts (Gauls), corresponding to what is now most of northern Italy.

Since the late 3rd century BC, it was considered geographically part of Italia by the Roman Republic, but remained administratively separated until 42 BC. It was a Roman province from c. 81 BC until 42 BC, when it was de jure merged into Roman Italy as already planned by Julius Caesar.

Cisalpine means "on this side of the Alps" (from the perspective of the Romans), as opposed to Transalpine Gaul ("on the far side of the Alps").

Gallia Cisalpina was further subdivided into Gallia Cispadana and Gallia Transpadana, i.e., its portions south and north of the Po River, respectively.

The Roman province of the 1st century BC was bounded on the north and west by the Alps, in the south as far as Placentia by the river Po, and then by the Apennines and the river Rubicon, and in the east by the Adriatic Sea.

In 49 BC, all inhabitants of Cisalpine Gaul received Roman citizenship, and eventually the province was divided among four of the eleven regions of Italy: Regio VIII Gallia Cispadana, Regio IX Liguria, Regio X Venetia et Histria, and Regio XI Gallia Transpadana.

== History ==
=== Early history ===
Map of Cisalpine Gaul showing in blue the approximate distributions of Celtic populations in the area during the 4th and 3rd centuries BC.

The Canegrate culture (13th century BC) may represent the first migratory wave of the proto-Celtic population from the northwest part of the Alps that, through the Alpine passes, penetrated and settled in the western Po valley between Lake Maggiore and Lake Como (Scamozzina culture). They brought a new funerary practice—cremation—which supplanted inhumation. It has also been proposed that a more ancient proto-Celtic presence can be traced back to the beginning of the Middle Bronze Age (16th–15th century BC), when, regarding the production of bronze artefacts, including ornaments, North Western Italy appears to have been closely linked to the western groups of the Tumulus culture (Central Europe, 1600 BC – 1200 BC). The bearers of the Canegrate culture maintained its homogeneity for only a century, after which it melded with the Ligurian aboriginal populations and with this union gave rise to a new phase called the Golasecca culture, which is nowadays identified with the Celtic Lepontii. According to Livy (v. 34), the Bituriges, Arverni, Senones, Aedui, Ambarri, Carnutes, and Aulerci led by Bellovesus, arrived in northern Italy during the reign of Tarquinius Priscus (7th–6th century BC) and occupied the area between Milan and Cremona. Milan (Mediolanum) itself was presumably founded by Gauls in the early 6th century BC; its name has a Celtic etymology: "[city] in the middle of the [Padanic] plain". Polybius, in the 2nd century BC, wrote that the Celts in northern Italy co-existed with Etruscan nations during a period before the Sack of Rome in 390 BC.

Ligures lived on the Northern Mediterranean Coast straddling southeast French and North-west Italian coasts, including parts of Tuscany, Elba island and Corsica. Ligurian tribes were also present in Latium (see Rutuli) and in Samnium. According to Plutarch they called themselves Ambrones, which suggests a possible relationship between them and the Ambrones of northern Europe. Little is known of the Ligurian language. Only place names and personal names remain. It appears to be an Indo-European language with both Italic and particularly strong Celtic affinities. Because of the strong Celtic influences on their language and culture, they were known in antiquity as Celto-Ligurians (in Greek Κελτολίγυες, Keltolígues). Modern linguists, like Xavier Delamarre, argue that Ligurian was a Celtic language with some similarity to Gaulish. The Ligurian-Celtic question is also discussed by Barruol (1999). Ancient Ligurian is listed either as Celtic (epigraphic) or Para-Celtic (onomastic).

The Veneti were an Indo-European people who inhabited north-eastern Italy, in an area corresponding to the modern-day region of the Veneto, Friuli, and Trentino. By the 4th century BC the Veneti had been so Celticized that Polybius wrote that the Veneti of the 2nd century BC were identical to the Gauls except for their language. The Greek historian Strabo (64 BC–AD 24), on the other hand, conjectured that the Adriatic Veneti were descended from Celts, who in turn were related to a later Celtic tribe of the same name whose members lived on the Armorican coast and fought against Julius Caesar. He further suggested that the identification of the Adriatic Veneti with the Paphlagonian Enetoi led by Antenor — which he attributes to Sophocles (496–406 BC) — had been a mistake caused by the similarity of the names.

=== Gallic expansion and Roman conquest ===
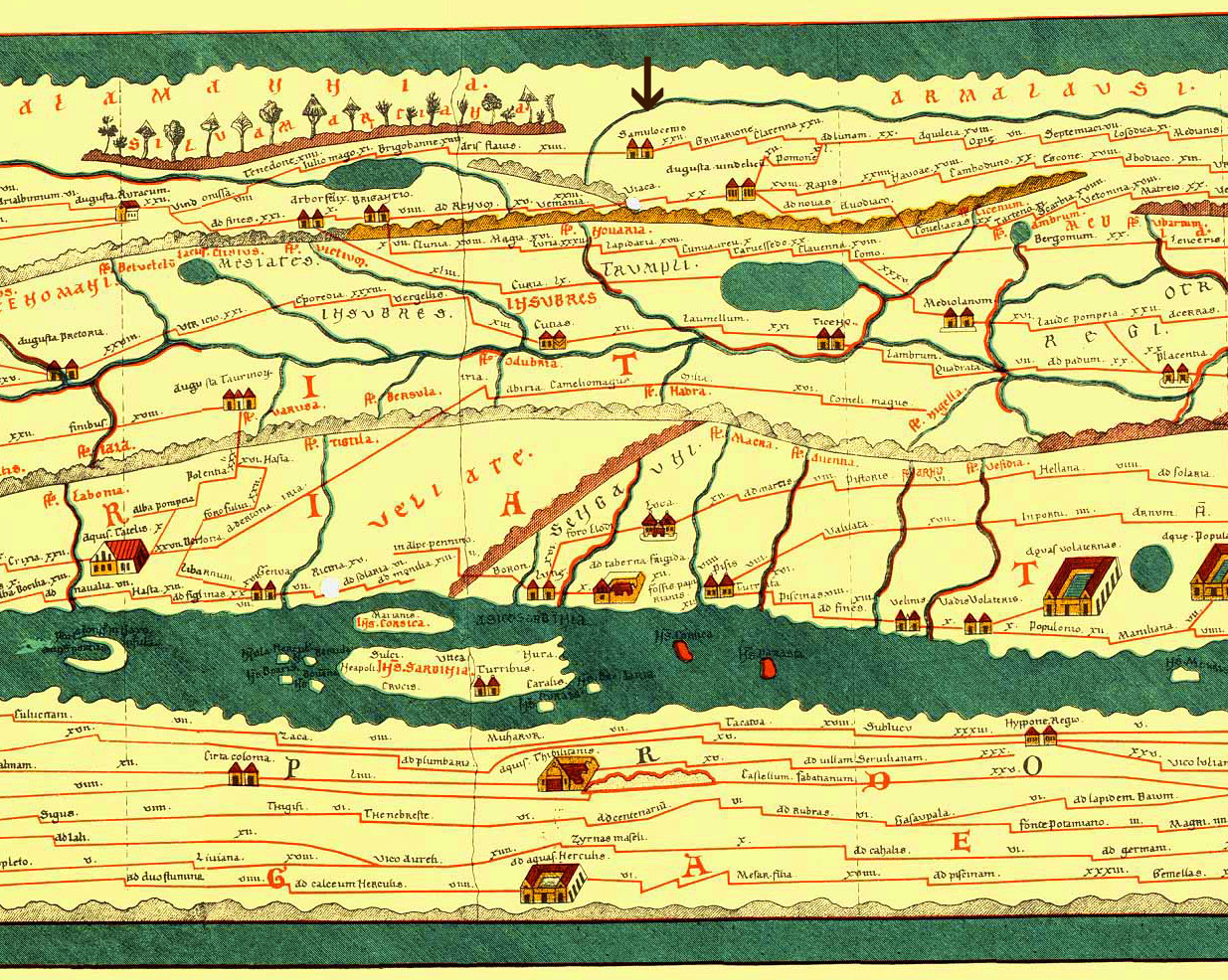
Detail of the Tabula Peutingeriana showing northern Italy between Augusta Pretoria (Aosta) and Placentia (Piacenza); the Insubres are marked as inhabiting the Po Valley upstream of Ticeno (Pavia) and downstream of the Trumpli and Mesiates which occupy the upper reaches of the Sesia and Agogna rivers.

In 391 BC, Celts "who had their homes beyond the Alps, streamed through the passes in great strength and seized the territory that lay between the Apennine mountains and the Alps" according to Diodorus Siculus. The Roman army was routed in the battle of Allia, and Rome was sacked in 390 BC by the Senones.

The defeat of the combined Samnite, Celtic and Etruscan alliance by the Romans in the Third Samnite War ending in 290 BC sounded the beginning of the end of the Celtic domination in mainland Europe. At the Battle of Telamon in 225 BC, a large Celtic army was trapped between two Roman forces and crushed.

In the Second Punic War, the Boii and Insubres allied themselves with the Carthaginians, laying siege to Mutina (Modena). In response, Rome sent an expedition led by L. Manlius Vulso. Vulso's army was ambushed twice, and the Senate sent Scipio with an additional force to provide support. These were the Roman forces encountered by Hannibal after he crossed the Alps. The Romans were defeated in the Battle of the Ticinus, leading all the Gauls except for the Cenomani to join the insurgency. Rome then sent the army of Tiberius Sempronius Longus who engaged Hannibal in the Battle of the Trebia, also resulting in a Roman defeat, forcing Rome to temporarily abandon Gallia Cisalpina altogether, returning only after the defeat of Carthage in 202 BC.

Publius Cornelius Scipio Nasica completed the conquest of the Boii in 191 BC, although the Ligurians were only finally subdued when the Apuani were defeated by Marcus Claudius Marcellus in 155 BC.

=== Roman province ===
Sometimes referred to as Gallia Citerior ("Hither Gaul"), Provincia Ariminum, or Gallia Togata ("Toga-wearing Gaul", indicating the region's early Romanization). Gallia Transpadana denoted that part of Cisalpine Gaul between the Padus (now the Po River) and the Alps, while Gallia Cispadana was the part to the south of the river.

Probably officially established around 81 BC, the province was governed from Mutina (modern-day Modena), where, in 73 BC, forces under Spartacus defeated the legion of Gaius Cassius Longinus, the provincial governor.

In 49 BC, with the Lex Roscia, Julius Caesar granted to the populations of the province full Roman citizenship.

The Rubicon River marked its southern boundary with Italia proper. By crossing this river in 49 BC with his loyal XIII Legion, returning from the conquest of Gaul, Julius Caesar precipitated the civil war within the Roman Republic which led, eventually, to the establishment of the Roman Empire. To this day the term "crossing the Rubicon" means, figuratively, "reaching the point of no return".

The province was merged into Italia about 42 BC, as part of Octavian's "Italicization" program during the Second Triumvirate. The dissolution of the provincia required a new governing law or lex, although its contemporary title is unknown. The parts of it inscribed on a bronze tablet preserved in the museum at Parma are entirely concerned with arranging the judiciary: the law appoints two viri and four viri juri dicundo and also mentions a Prefect of Mutina.

Virgil, Catullus and Livy, three famous sons of the province, were born in Gallia Cisalpina.

== Archaeology ==
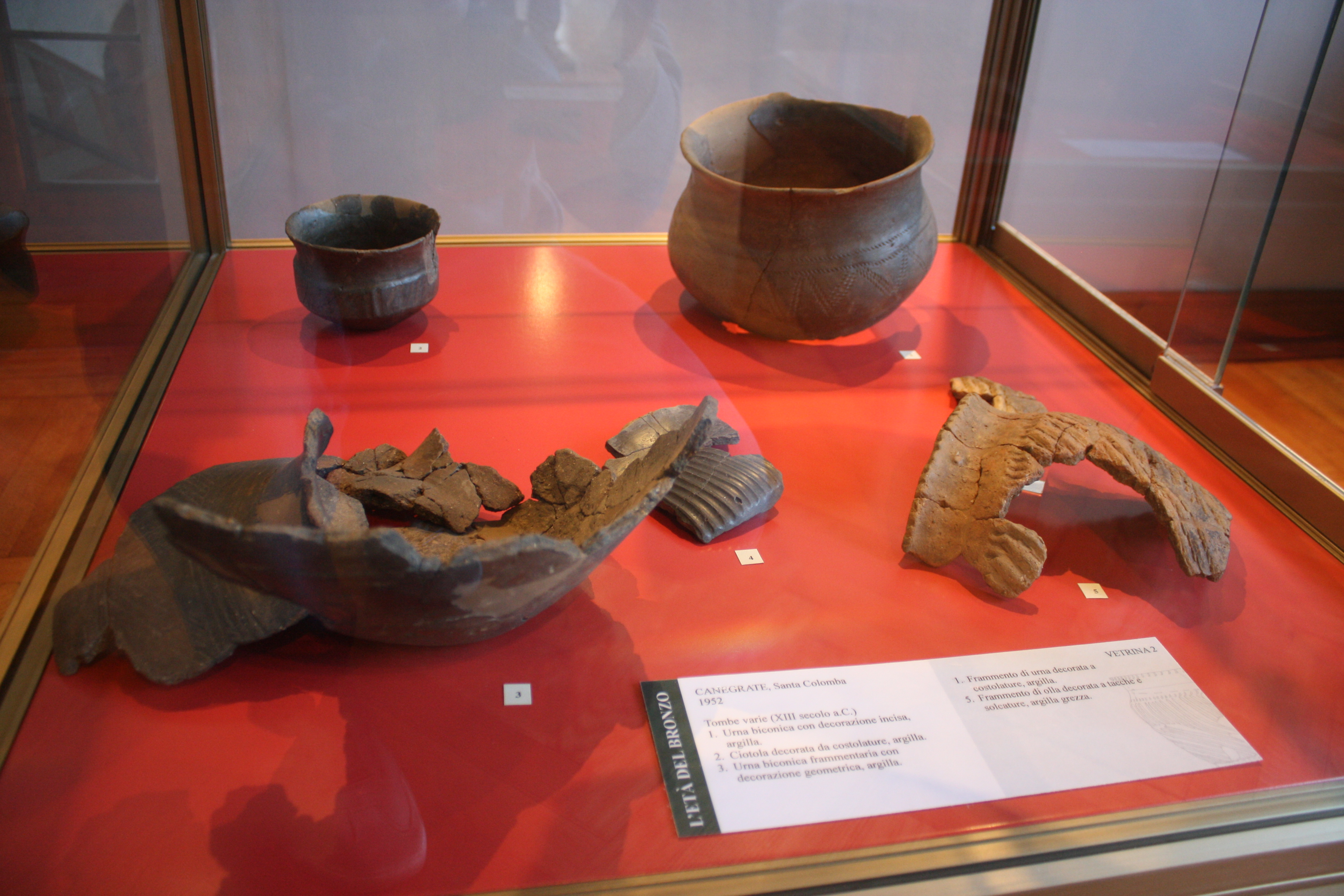
Archaeological finds of Canegrate culture

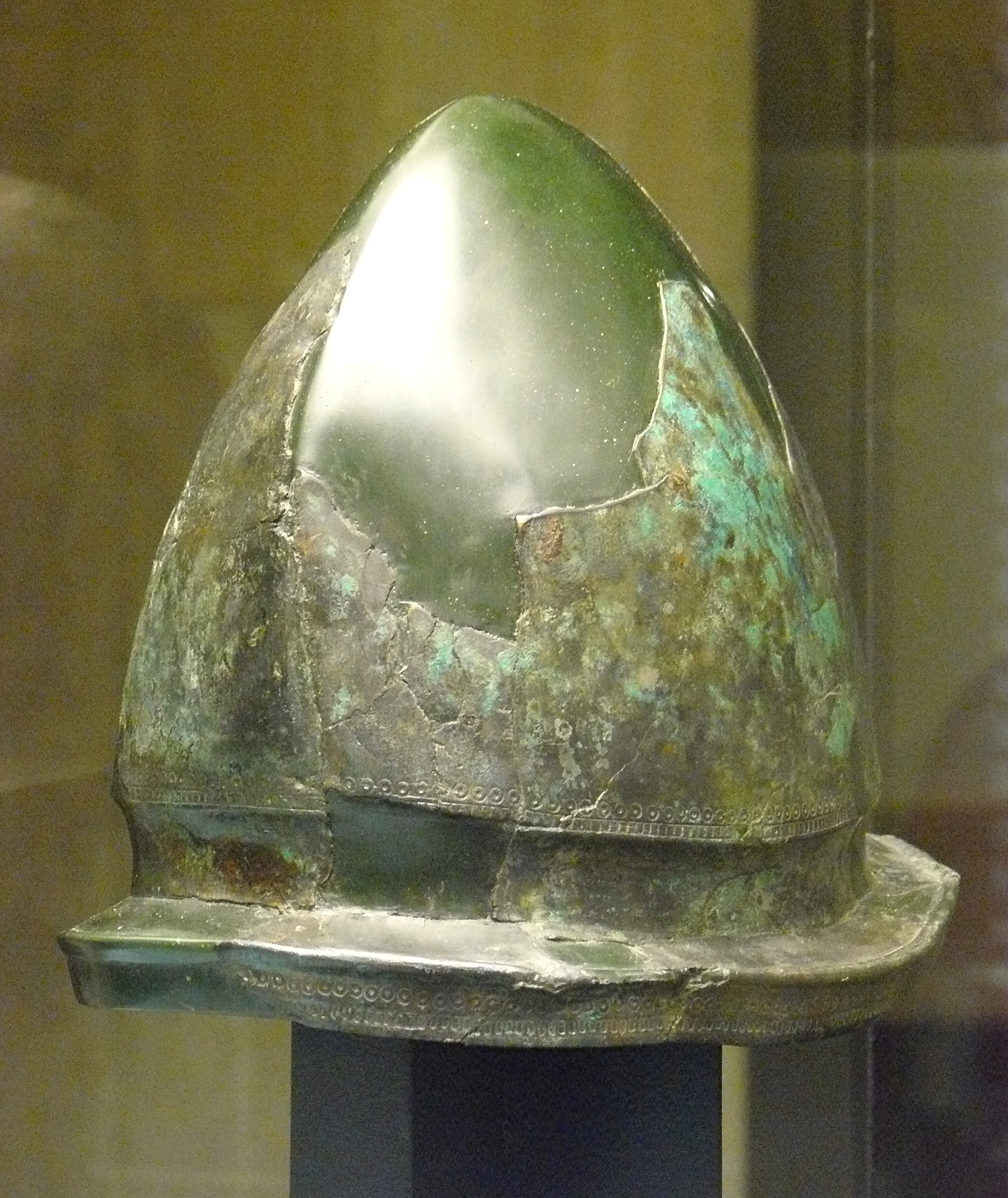
Golasecca culture helmet

=== Canegrate culture ===
The Canegrate culture reflects a late Bronze Age to early Iron Age culture in the Pianura Padana. These areas are now known as western Lombardy, eastern Piedmont and Canton Ticino.

The Canegrate culture testifies to the arrival of Urnfield migratory wave of populations from the northwest part of the Alps that, crossing the alpine passes, had infiltrated and settled in the western Po area between Lake Maggiore and the Lake of Como (see Scamozzina culture). They were bearers of a new funerary practice, which supplanted the old culture of inhumation and instead introduced cremation.

The population of Canegrate maintained its own homogeneity for a limited period, approximately a century, after which it blended with the Ligurian aboriginal populations to create the new Golasecca culture.

=== Golasecca culture ===
The Culture of Golasecca (9th to 4th centuries BC) spread between the end of the Bronze Age and the beginning of the Iron Age in the areas of northwestern Lombardy and Piedmont, and the Canton Ticino. At the end of the prehistoric period, this was an area where travellers frequently stopped and had contact with the Hallstatt culture to the west, the Urnfield culture to the north and with the Villanova culture to the south. The Golasecca culture was initially concentrated in the foothills area south of the Alps. It later spread throughout the lakes area, and established many settlements representing this original culture. The oldest remains found thus far can be dated from the 9th century BC.

== Language ==
There is some debate whether the Lepontic language should be considered as a Gaulish dialect or an independent branch within Continental Celtic. Apart from Lepontic, the "Cisalpine Gaulish language" proper would be the Gaulish language as spoken by the Gauls invading northern Italy in the 4th century BC. This is a dialect of the larger Gaulish language, with some known phonetic features distinguishing it from Transalpine dialects, such as -nn- replacing -nd- and s(s) replacing -χs-.

== See also ==
- Northern Italy
- Canegrate culture
- Golasecca culture
- Cisalpine Gaulish
- Etruscans
- Iron Age Italy
- Ancient peoples of Italy
- Transalpine Gaul
