= Golasecca culture =

Archaeological culture in Northern Italy

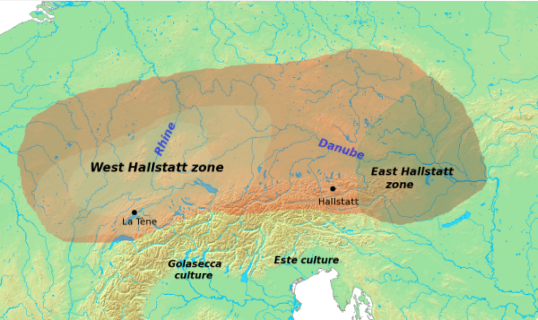
- Geographical range: North Italy
- Period: Bronze Age, Iron Age
- Dates: c. 9th century BC – 350 BC
- Preceded by: Canegrate culture, Urnfield culture
- Followed by: La Tène culture, Roman Republic

The Golasecca culture (9th – 4th centuries BC) was a Late Bronze Age/Early Iron Age culture in northern Italy, whose type-site was excavated at Golasecca in the province of Varese, Lombardy, where, in the area of Monsorino at the beginning of the 19th century, Abbot Giovanni Battista Giani made the first findings of about fifty graves with pottery and metal objects.

The Golasecca culture developed through a process of cultural continuity from the earlier Canegrate culture, which emerged around the 13th century BC and displayed strong connections with the Central European Urnfield tradition. The Golasecca culture is regarded as an early western example of the broader Hallstatt movement, characterized by specialized pottery and metalworking.

The culture's material evidence is scattered over a wide area of 20,000 km^{2} south of the Alps, between the rivers Po, Serio and Sesia, and bordered on the north by the Alpine passes. The so-called Golasecca era began with the first Celtic migrations into northern Italy around 850 BC and ended with the onset of the first waves of Gallic invasions of the Po Valley, around 375 BC.

== Archaeological sources ==
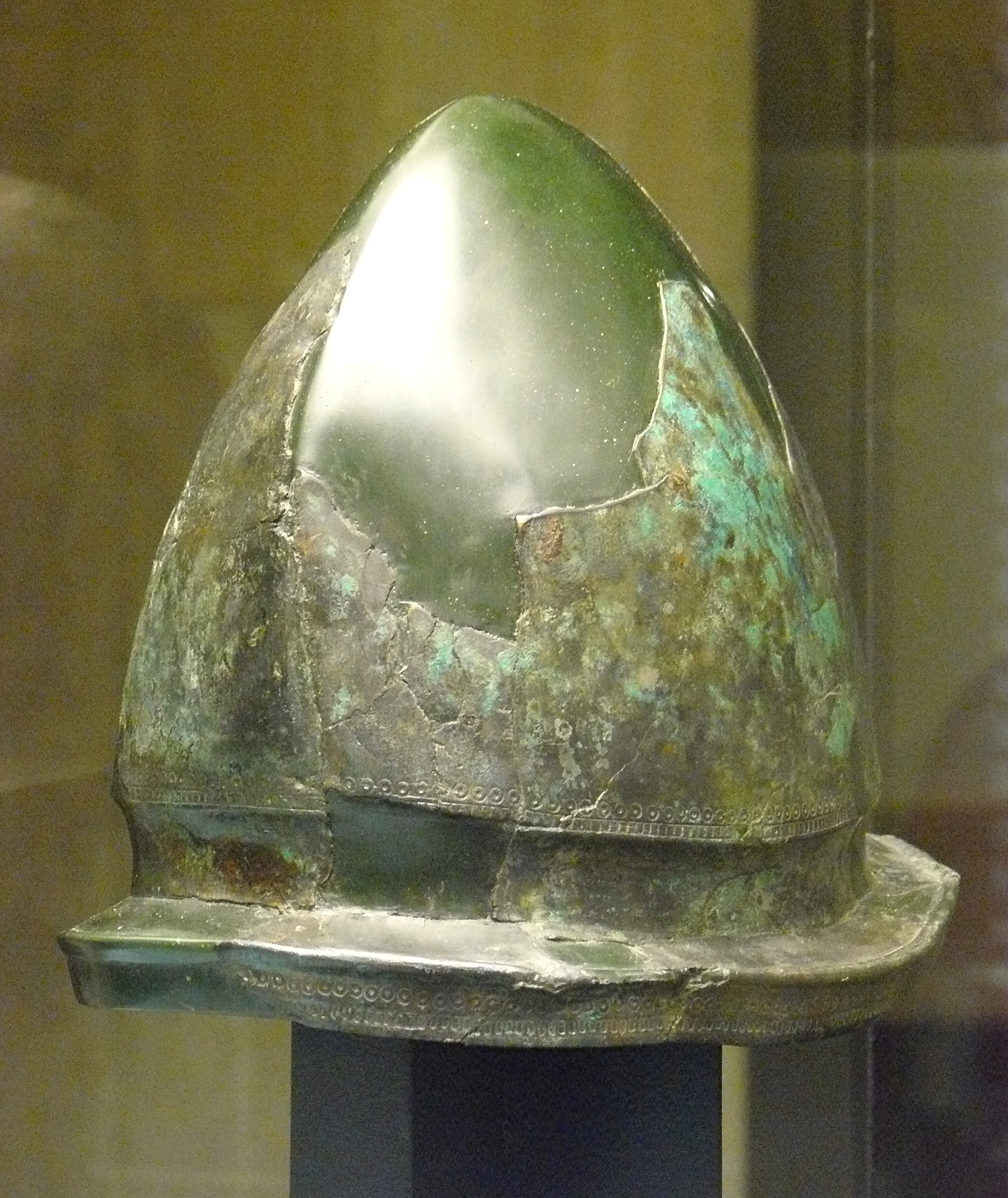
Negau type helmet from the Golasecca III period (480/450 BC).

The name of the Golasecca culture comes from the first findings that were discovered from excavations conducted from 1822 at several locations in the Comune of Golasecca, by the antiquarian abbot Father Giovanni Battista Giani (1788–1857), who misidentified the clearly non-Roman burials as remains from the Battle of Ticinus in 218 BC between Hannibal and Scipio Africanus. Most of the inventoried objects were from different graves located in the areas of Sesto Calende, Golasecca and Castelletto sopra Ticino.

In 1865, Louis Laurent Gabriel de Mortillet, a founder of European archaeology, rightly assigned the same tombs to a pre-Roman culture of the early Iron Age, with a likely Celtic substratum given the similarities with the Hallstatt culture. He made several trips there, bringing back to France part of the Abbot Giani's collection to enrich the Musée des Antiquités Nationales collections, of which he was Vice-curator.

The excavations spread over various sites throughout the late 19th century. Alexandre Bertrand, also curator of the Musée des Antiquités Nationales in turn went on site in 1873 and conducted some excavations by himself. With the collaboration of French, Italian and German archaeologists meeting at the Archaeological Congress of Stockholm in 1874, the timing of the Culture of Golasecca became clearer, divided into three periods from 900 to 380 BC. It ended with the Gallic invasion of the Po Valley in 388 BC.

The modern assessment of Golasecca culture is derived from the campaigns of 1965–69 on Monsorino, directed by A. Mira Bonomi. More recent chronological studies have been produced by Raffaele De Marinis.

In the area of Castelletto sopra Ticino, between 2001 and 2003, an excavation conducted under the direction of Filippo Maria Gambari unearthed in the district of Castelletto sopra Ticino (Via del Maneggio, Via Aronco, Via Repubblica) the oldest aristocratic necropolis of Piedmont, developed between the end of the ninth and the seventh centuries BC. It turned around 670 BC in an area of the dynastic cult of the first proto-urban centre of Piedmont. Of the 44 graves identified in the excavations, 33 were still almost intact. After a long activity of cataloguing and restoration, the artefacts (urns and grave goods) were exhibited between 2009 and 2010 at the multipurpose room Albino Calletti of Castelletto sopra Ticino in a major exhibition entitled L’alba della città – Le prime necropoli del centro protourbano di Castelletto Ticino.

== Periodization ==
Incineration and inhumation in Iron Age Italy

Subsequent phases of the Golasecca culture are so periodized:

1. Canegrate culture: 13th century BC.
2. Proto-Golasecca: 12th–10th centuries BC.
  1. Type Ascona I or A (12th century)
  2. Type Ascona II or B (11th century)
  3. Type Ca’ Morta (Como) – Malpensa (10th century).
3. Golasecca I A: 9th–8th centuries BC.
4. Golasecca I B: late 8th – early 7th centuries BC.
5. Golasecca I C: 7th century BC.
6. Golasecca II A: 600–550 BC.
7. Golasecca II B: 550–500 BC.
8. Golasecca III A: 500–350 BC.
  1. G. III A 1: 500–450 BC.
  2. G. III A 2: 450–400 BC.
  3. G. III A 3: 400–350 BC.

== History ==
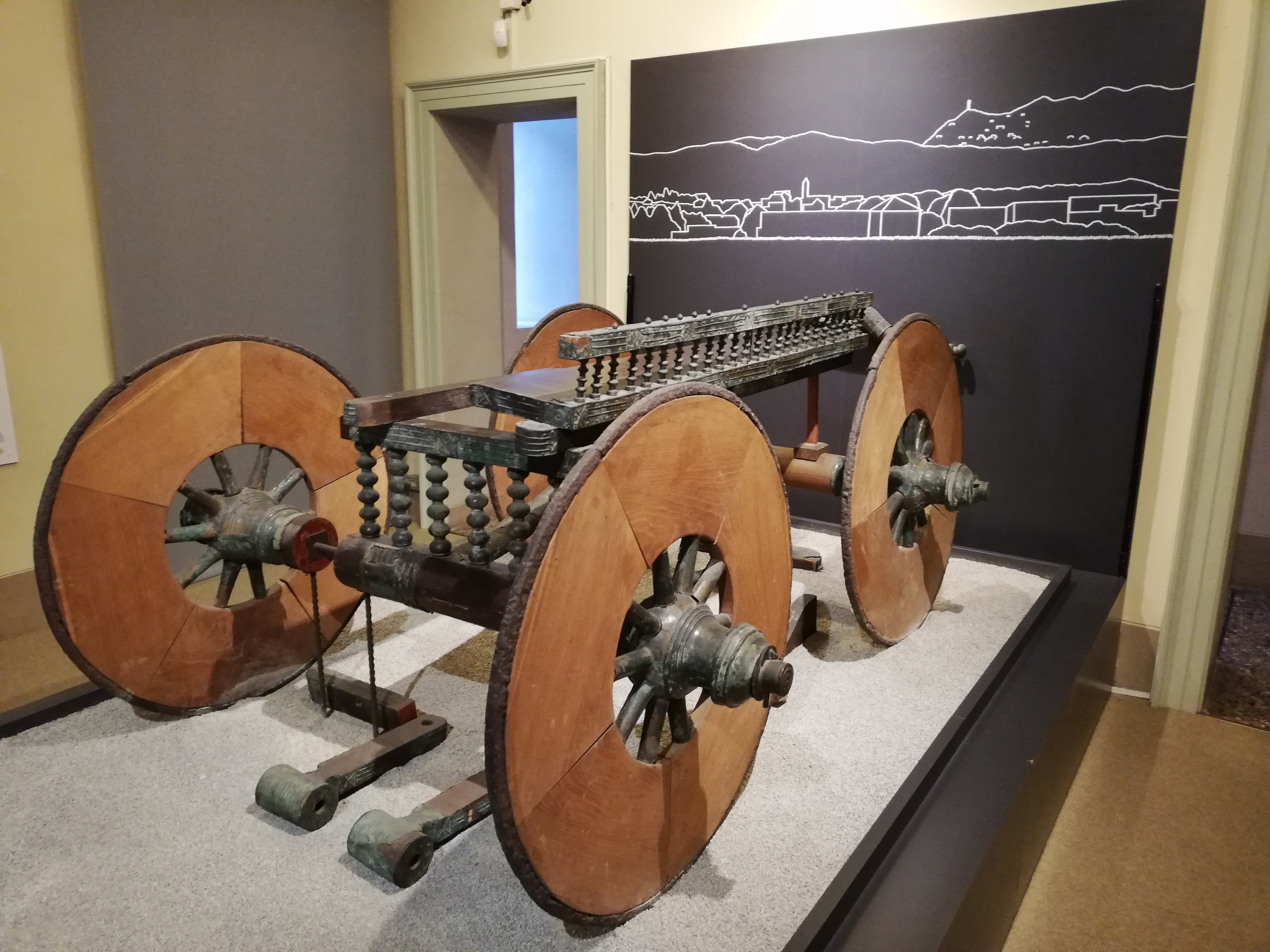
Funerary wagon, 500–450 BC

Sites characteristic of Golasecca culture have been identified in western Lombardy, eastern Piedmont, the Canton Ticino and Val Mesolcina, in a territory stretching north of the Po River to sub-alpine zones, between the course of the Serio to the east and the Sesia to the west. The site of Golasecca, where the Ticino exits from Lake Maggiore, flourished from particularly favourable geographical circumstances as it was quite suitable for long-distance exchanges, in which Golaseccans acted as intermediaries between Etruscans and the Hallstatt culture of Austria, on the all-important trade in salt.

The commercial mediation then broadened to include the Greek world, bringing in oil and wine, bronze objects, Attic pottery, incense and coral, and northwards the more distant transalpine world, sources of tin for bronze and amber from the Baltic Sea.

In a broader context, the subalpine Golasecca culture is the very last expression of the Middle European Urnfield culture of the European Bronze Age. The culture's richest flowering was Golasecca II, in the first half of the 6th to early 5th centuries BC. It lasted until it was overwhelmed by the Gaulish Celts in the 4th century BC and was finally incorporated into the hegemony of the Roman Republic.

Golasecca culture is divided for convenient reference into three parts: the first two cover the period of the 9th to the first half of the 5th century BC; the third, coinciding with La Tène A-B of the later Iron Age in this region and extending to the end of the 4th century BC, is marked by increasing Celtic influences, culminating in Celtic hegemony after the conquests of 388 BC. The very earliest finds are of the Late Bronze Age (9th century BC), apparently building upon a local culture.

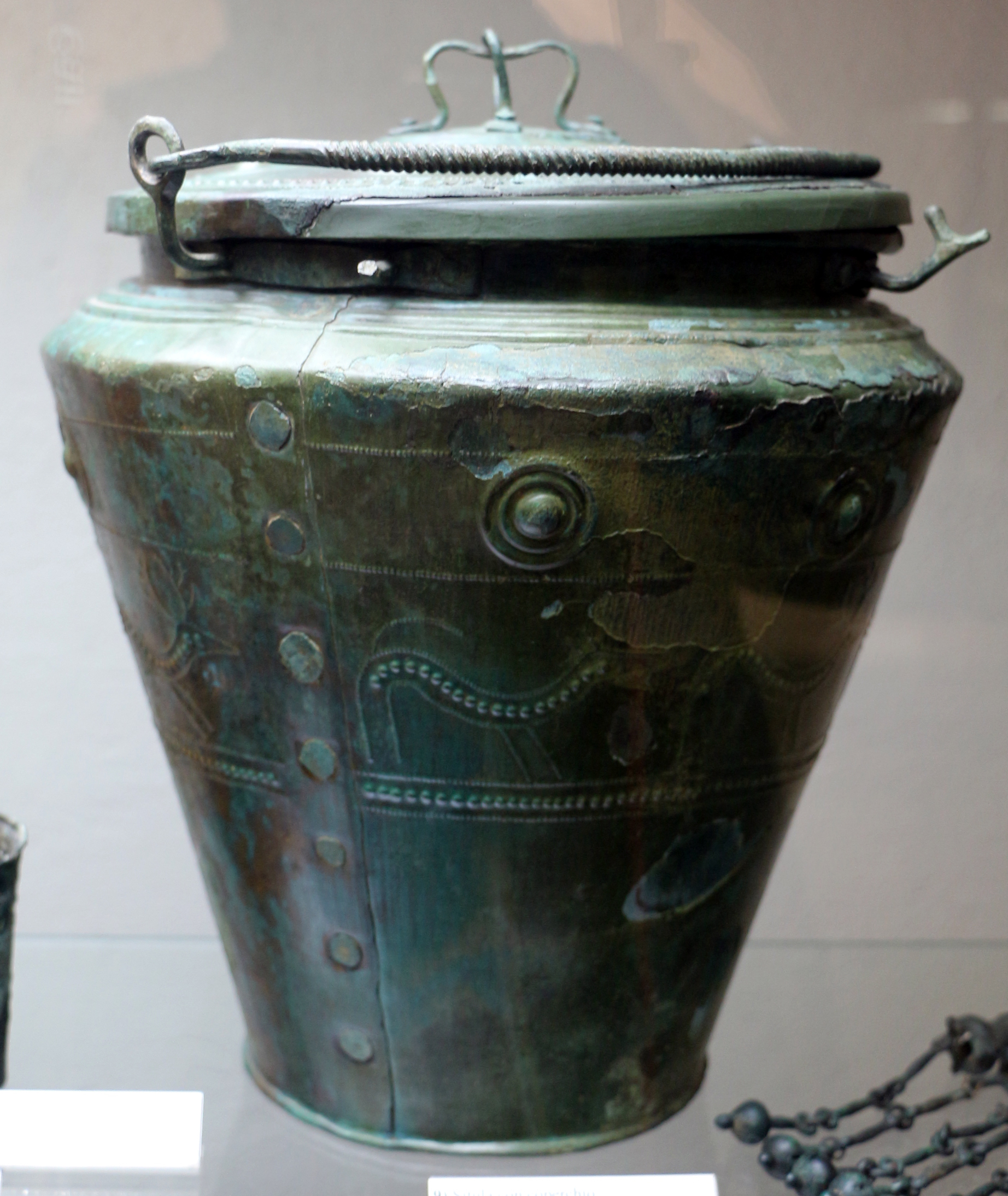
Bronze situla, 500 BC

In the Golasecca culture, some of the first evolved characteristics of historic society may be seen in the specialized use of materials and the adaptation of the local terrain. The early-period habitations were circular wooden constructions along the edge of the river's floodplain; each was built on a low basement of stone around a central hearth and floored with river pebbles set in clay. Hand-shaped ceramics, made without a potter's wheel, were decorated in gesso. The use of the wheel is known from the carts in the Tomb of the Warrior at the Sesto Calende site. Amber beads from the Baltic Sea, doubtless brought down the Amber Road, and obsidian reveal networks of long-distance trade. From the 7th century onwards some tombs contain burial goods imported from Etruscan areas and Greek objects.

The settlements depended on domesticated animals: remains reveal the presence of goats, sheep, pigs, cattle and horses. Some legumes and cereal crops were cultivated; nuts and fruits were collected. The dugout boats from Castelletto Ticino and Porto Tolle are conserved at the museum of Isola Bella. Metal, though rare, was in increasing use.

The old sites—Golasecca, Sesto Calende, Castelletto Ticino—maintained their traditional autochthonous character through the 6th century BC, when outside influences begin to be detectable. At the beginning of the 5th century BC, pastoral practices resulted in the development of new settlements in the plains.

Deciphered written characters (the "Lepontic alphabet") are found incised in ceramics or on stone, in the Celtic "Lepontic language".

== Burials ==
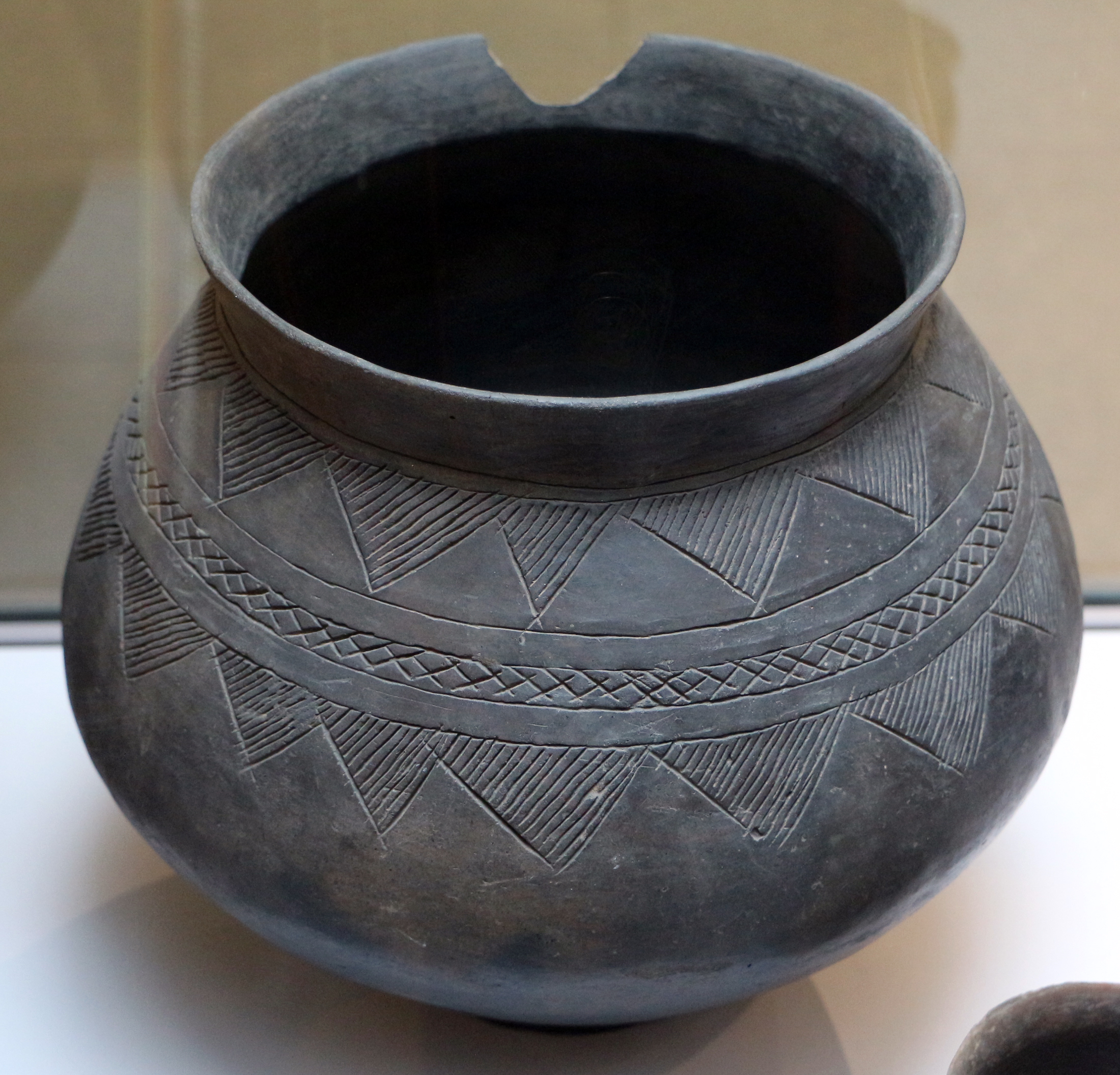
Cinerary urn

The Golasecca culture is best known for its burial customs, where an apparent ancestor cult imposed respect for the necropolis, a sacred area untouched by agrarian use or deforestation. The early-period burials took place in selected raised positions oriented with respect to the sun. Burial practices were direct inhumation or in a lidded cistae. Stone circles and alignments are found. Burial urns were painted with designs, with accessory ceramics, such as cups on tall bases. Bronze objects are usually of wearing apparel: pins and fibulas, armbands, rings, earrings, pendants and necklaces. Bronze vessels are rare. The practice of cremation persists into the second period (early sixth to mid-fourth centuries).

Cremation near the burial site, followed by ash and bone burials in terracotta jars, in excavated pits set at determined distances one from the other in scattered necropolises, characterize a culture of many small village settlements.

At the site of Sesto Calende, south of Lake Maggiore, were two chariot burials dating to the 7th and 6th century BC, accompanied with weapons, ornaments and a large situla while an earlier burial at Ca' Morta – Como (c. 700 BC) included a four-wheeled wagon in the tomb. Unlike the Este and Villanova cultures of Bologna, the Golasecca culture is characterized by the presence of a large warrior class, as is clear from the chariots and weapons found in the tombs of some of their leaders.

In a Golasecca culture tomb in Pombia, the oldest known remains of common hop beer in the world have been found.

== The ethnographic question ==
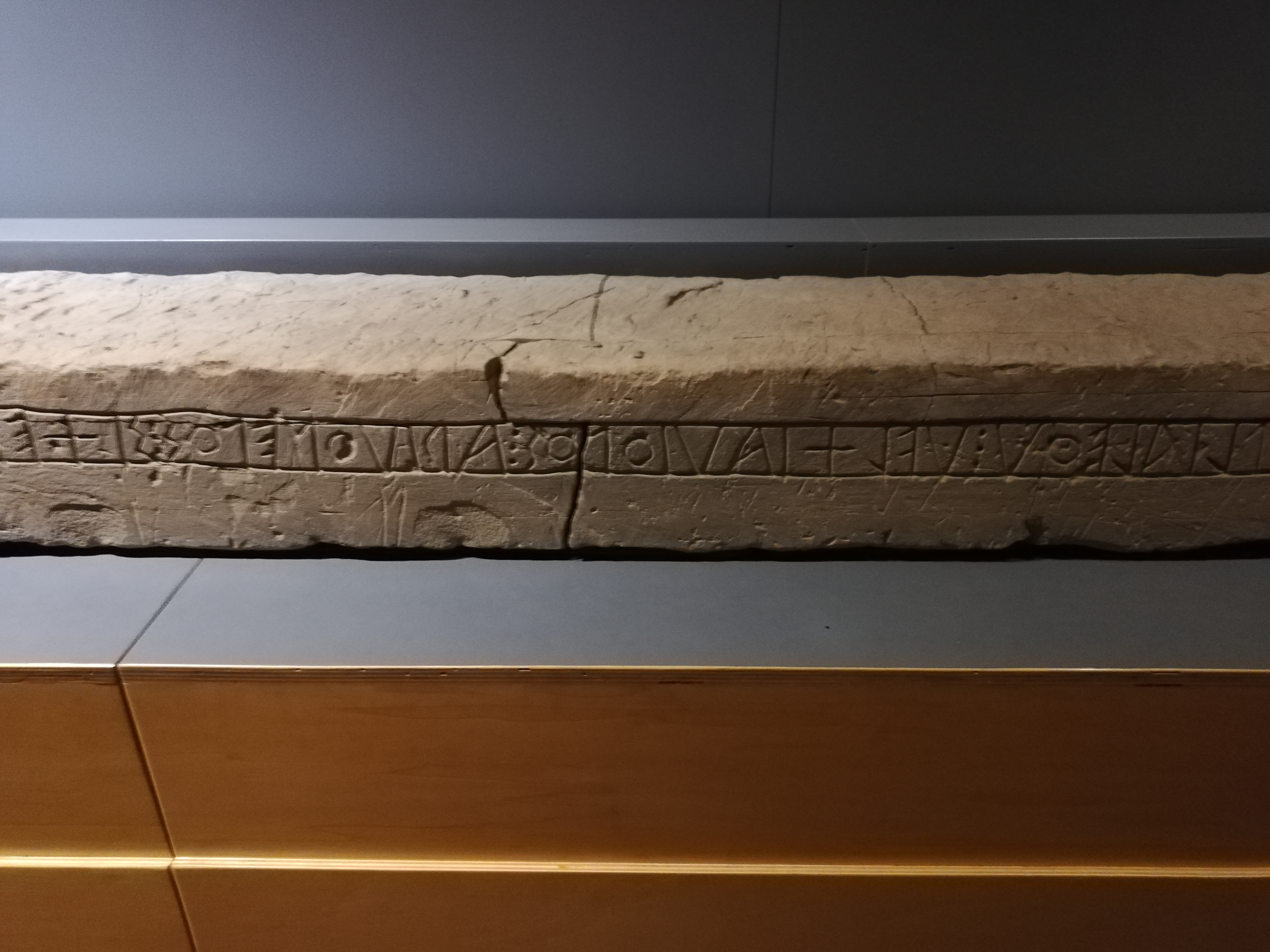
Lepontic inscription, 6th–5th centuries BC

The study of the so-called Lepontic inscriptions, written in the alphabet of Lugano utilized by Golaseccans of the 6th and 5th centuries BC, led Michel Lejeune (1971) to establish definitively the membership of the language conveyed by this writing to the family of Celtic languages.

It is then proved the existence of a pre-Gallic celticity in the North-Western Italy, preceding the 4th century BC, whose origin must be sought long before the 600s BC, date of the invasion of Bellovesus, that is, at least at the time of Canegrate culture (13th century BC), which presents in the pottery and bronze artifacts many points in common with the most western groups of the Urnfield culture (Rhine-Switzerland-eastern France, 13th – 8th centuries BC). Or perhaps, a more likely hypothesis, is that a more ancient proto-Celtic presence can be traced back to the beginning of the Middle Bronze Age (16th-15th century BC), when North Western Italy appears closely linked regarding the production of bronze artifacts, including ornaments, to the western groups of the Tumulus culture.

== Gallery ==
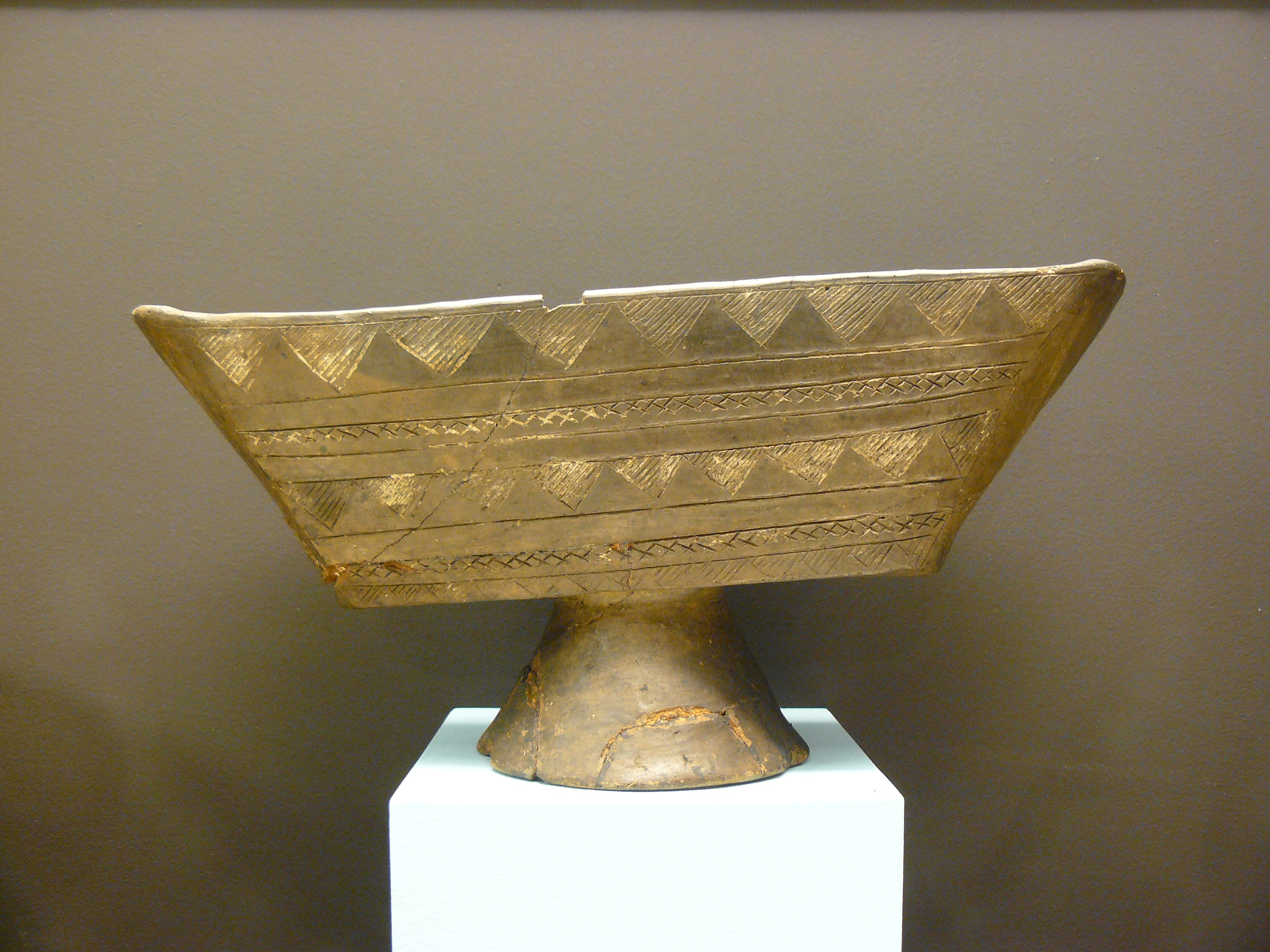

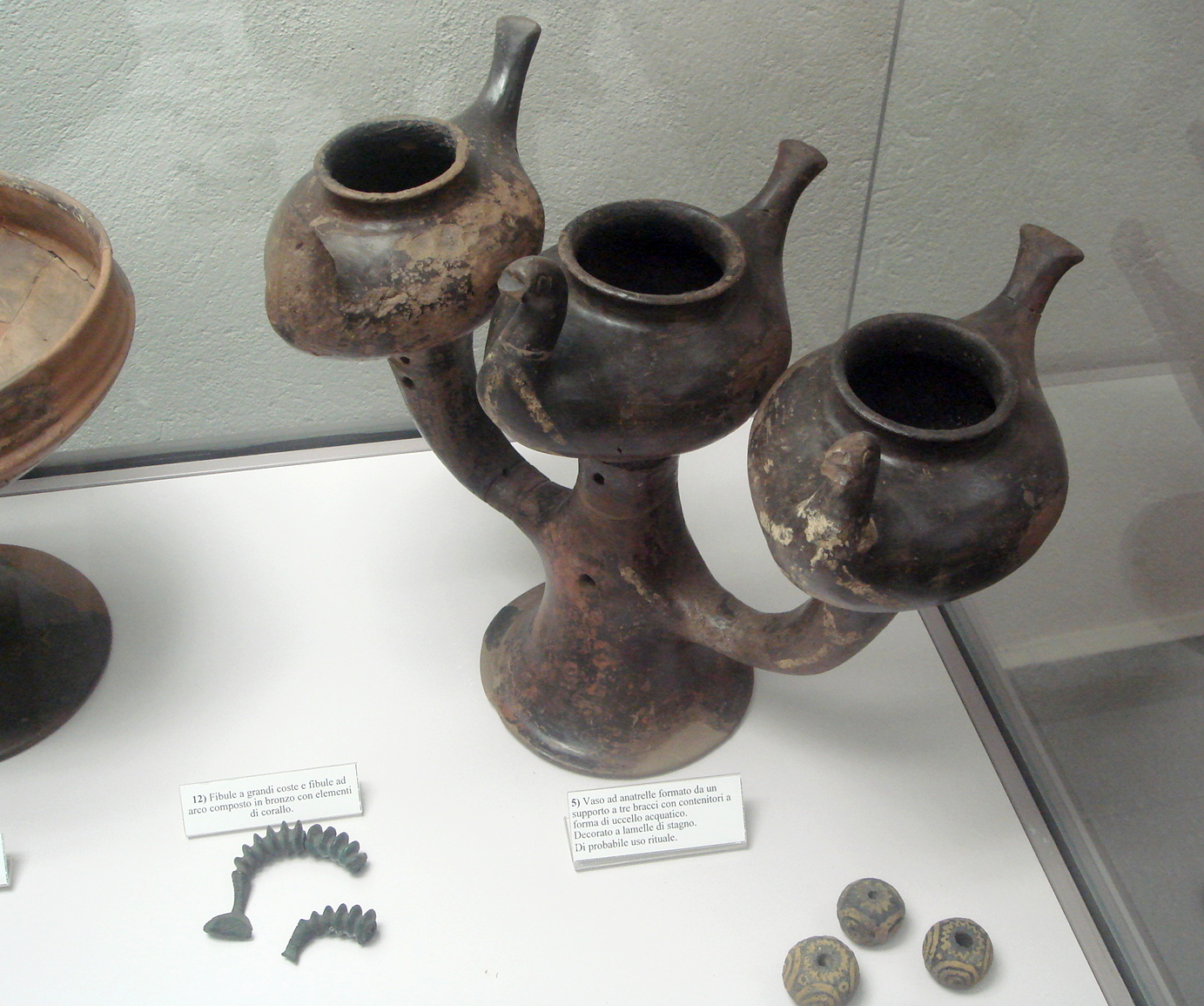

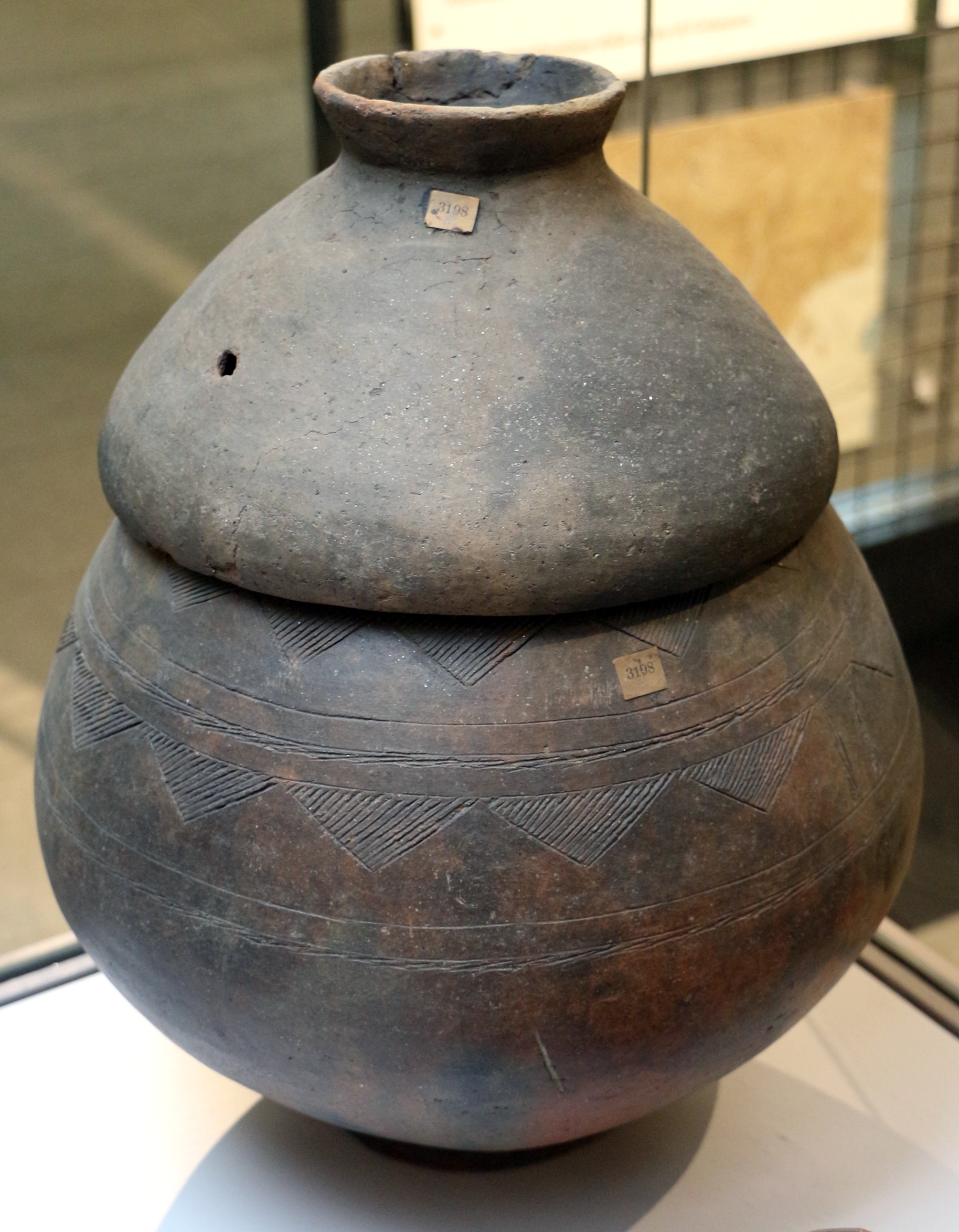

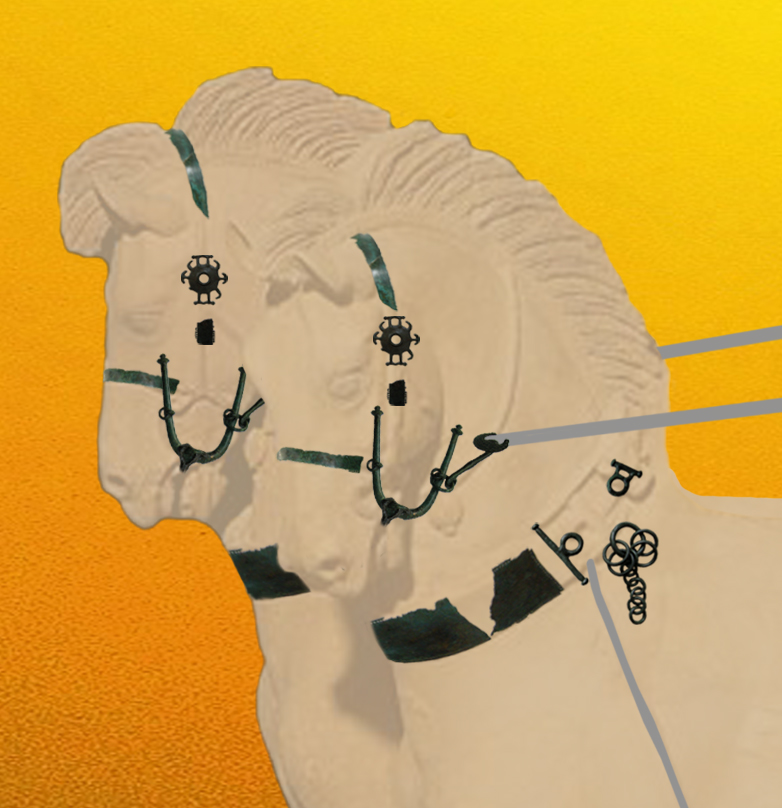

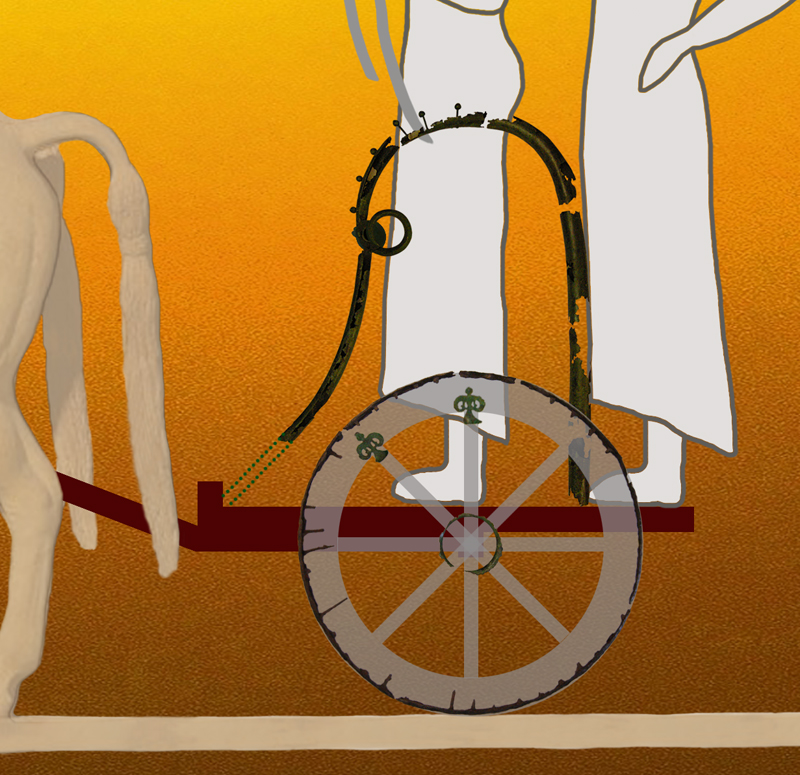

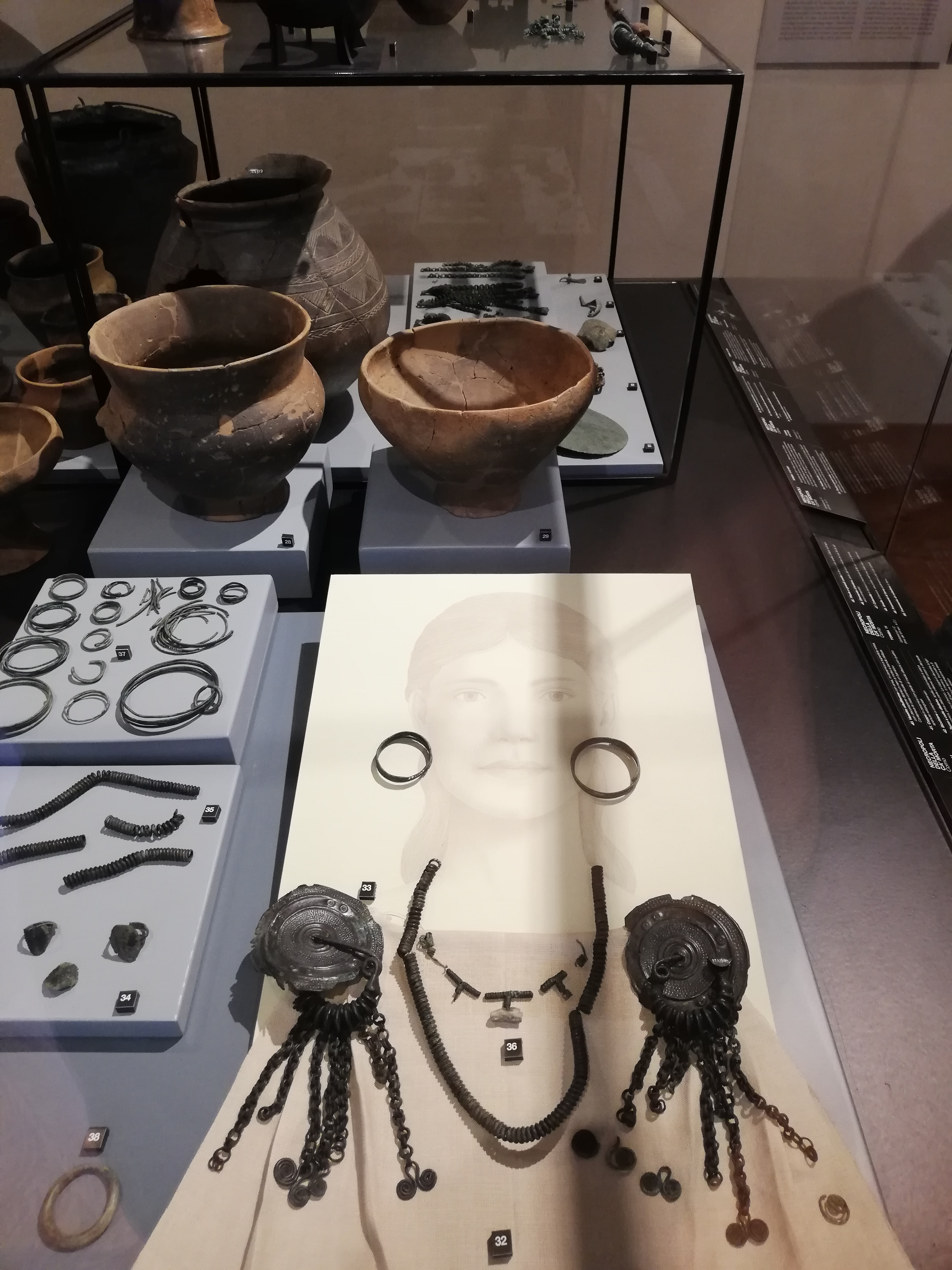

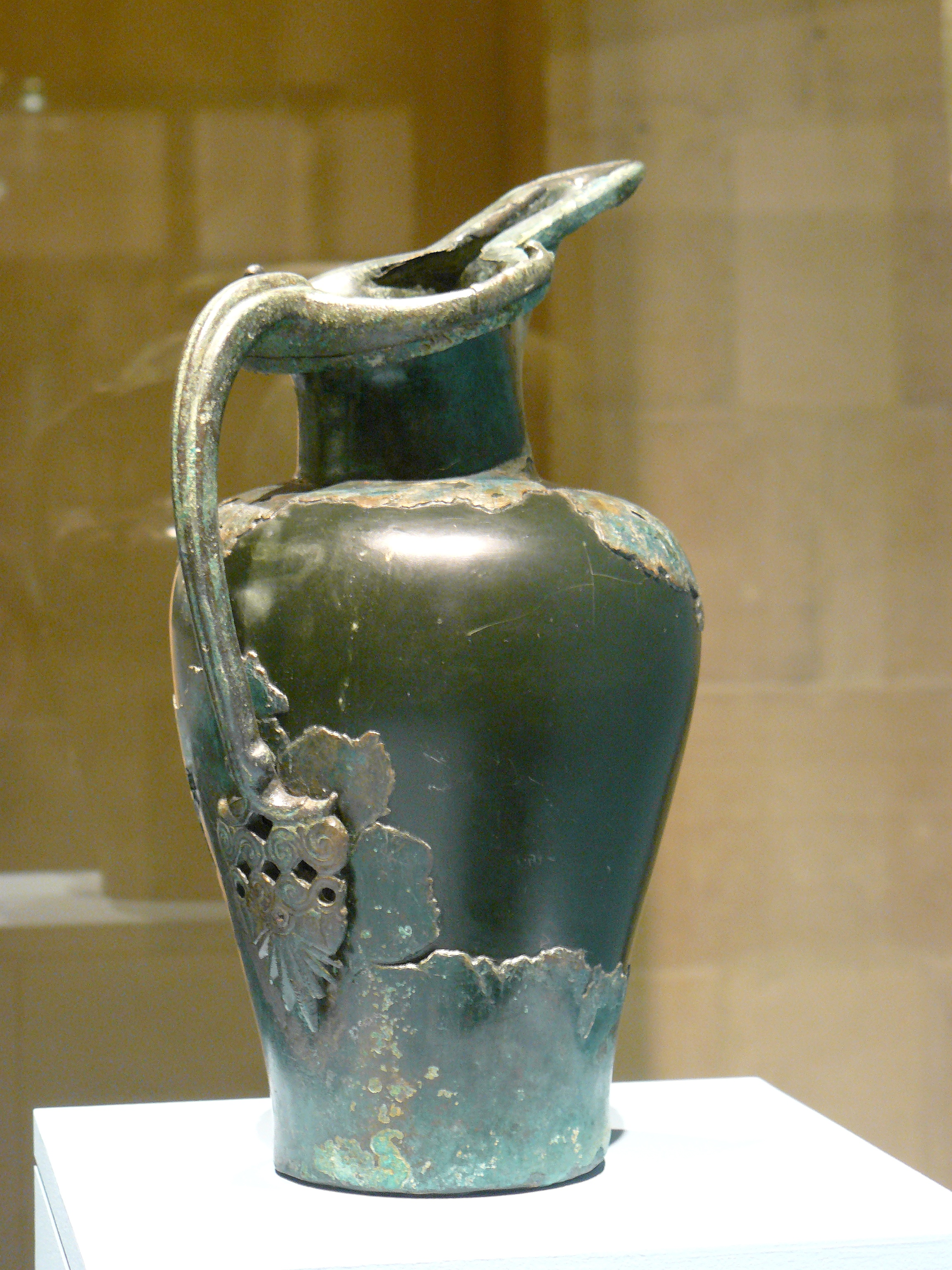

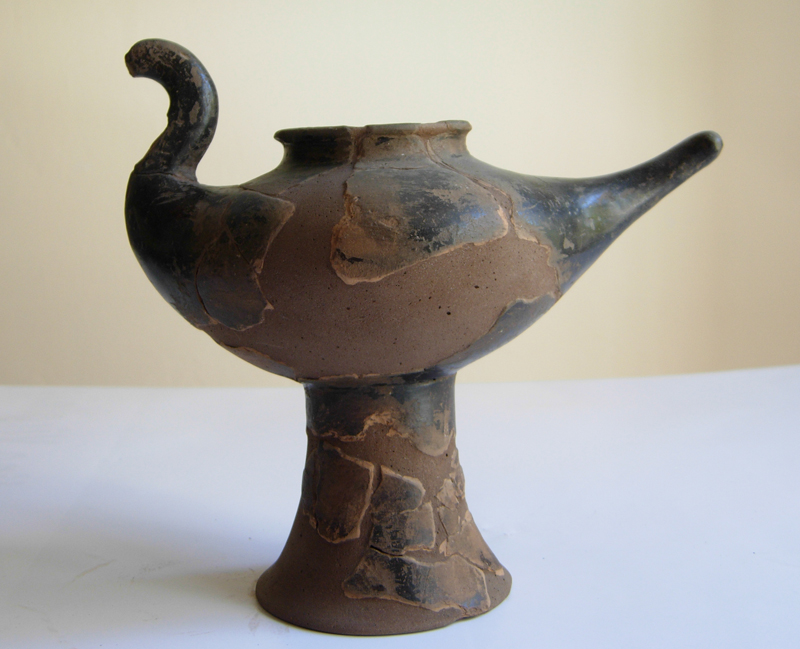

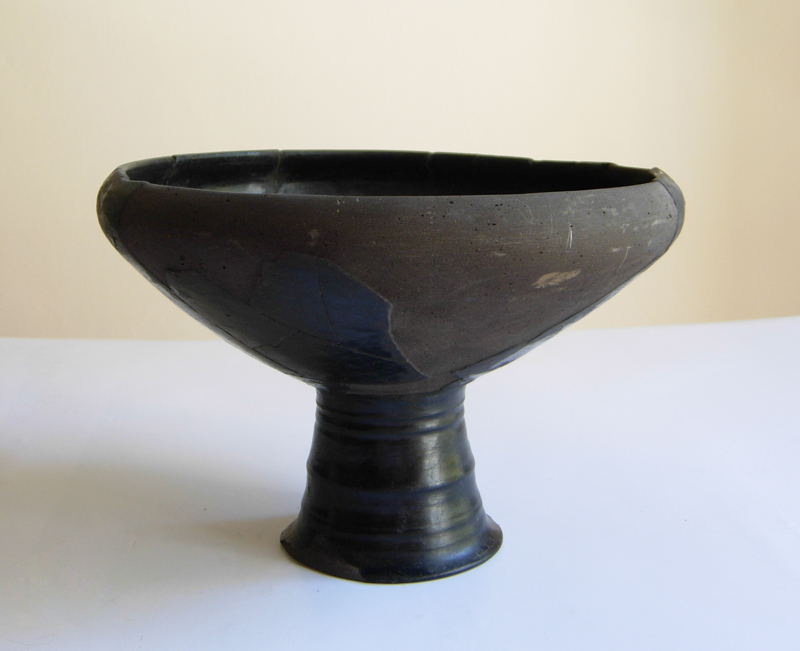

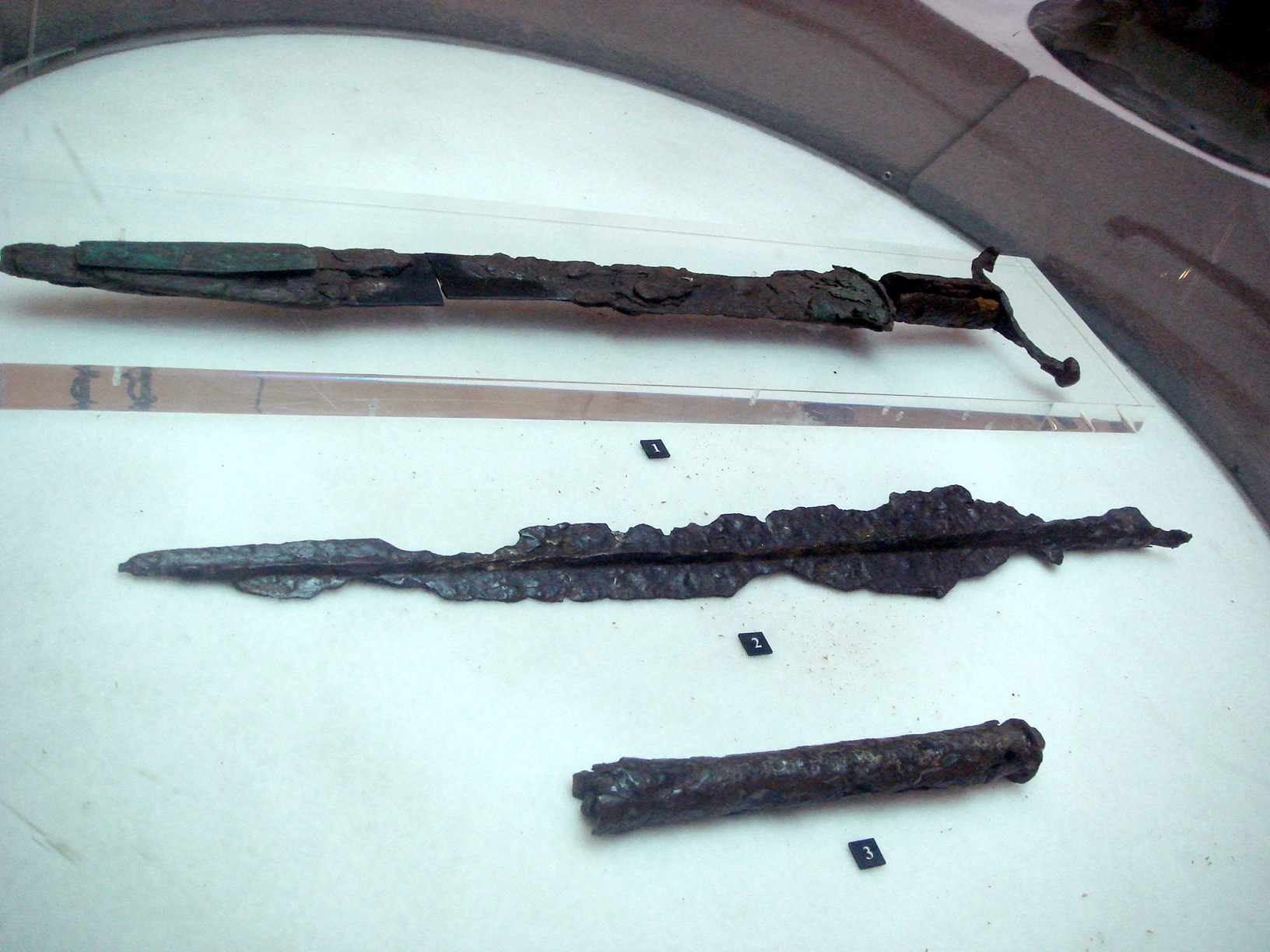

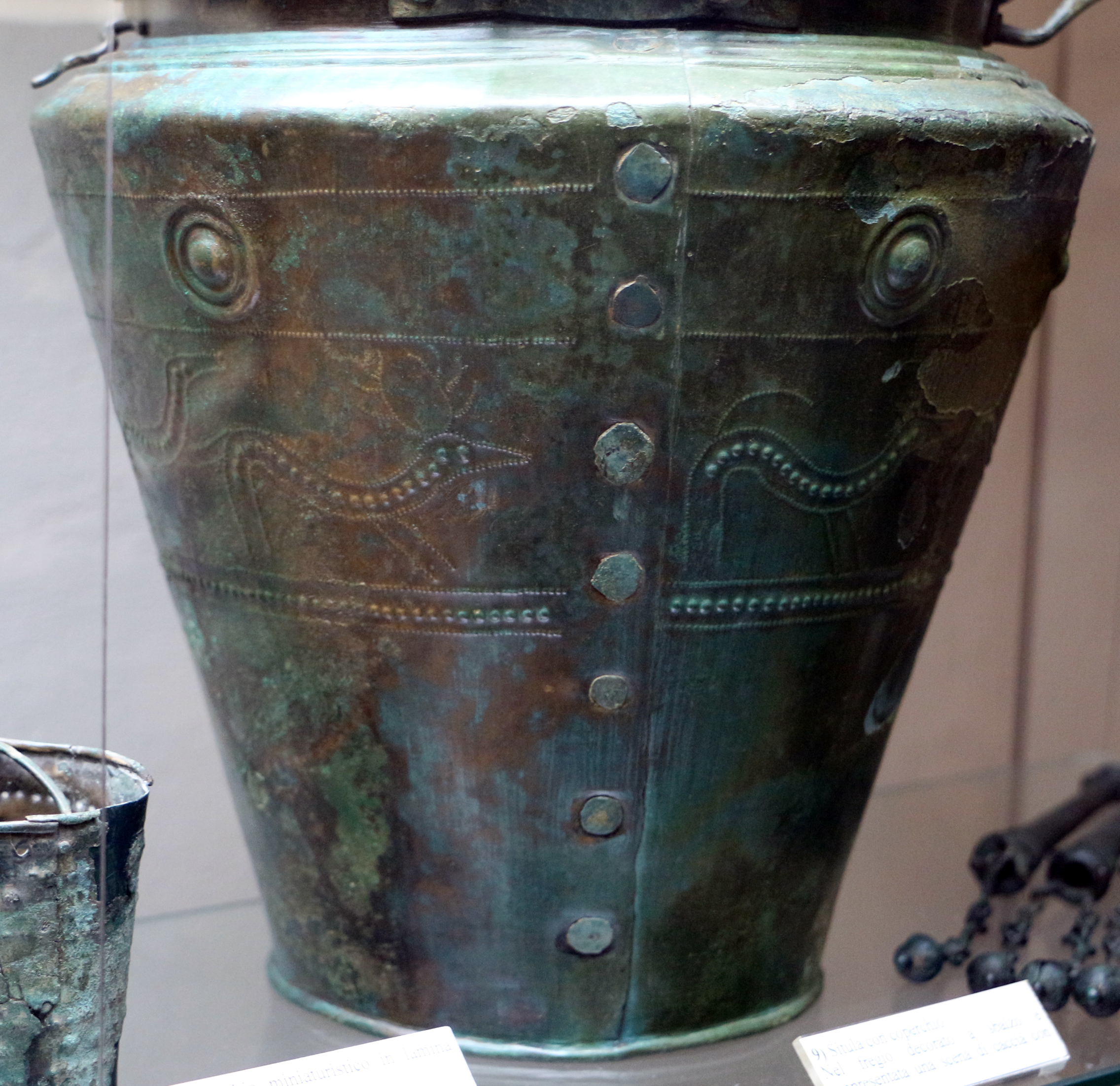

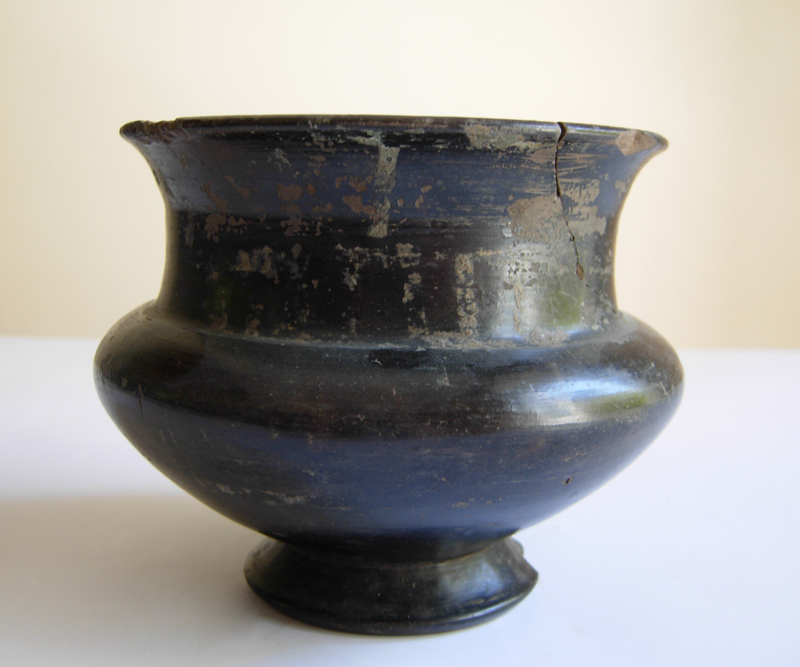

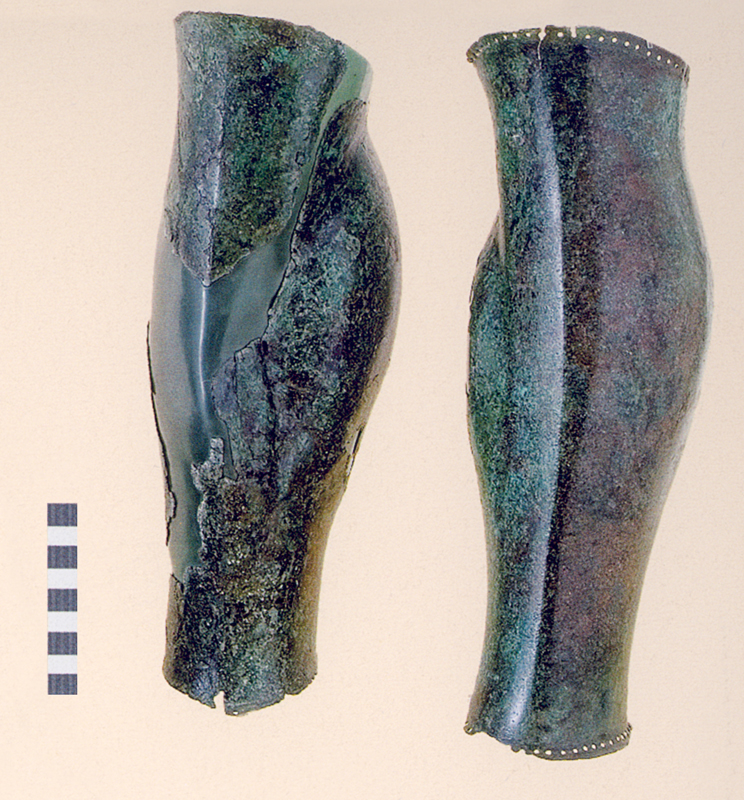

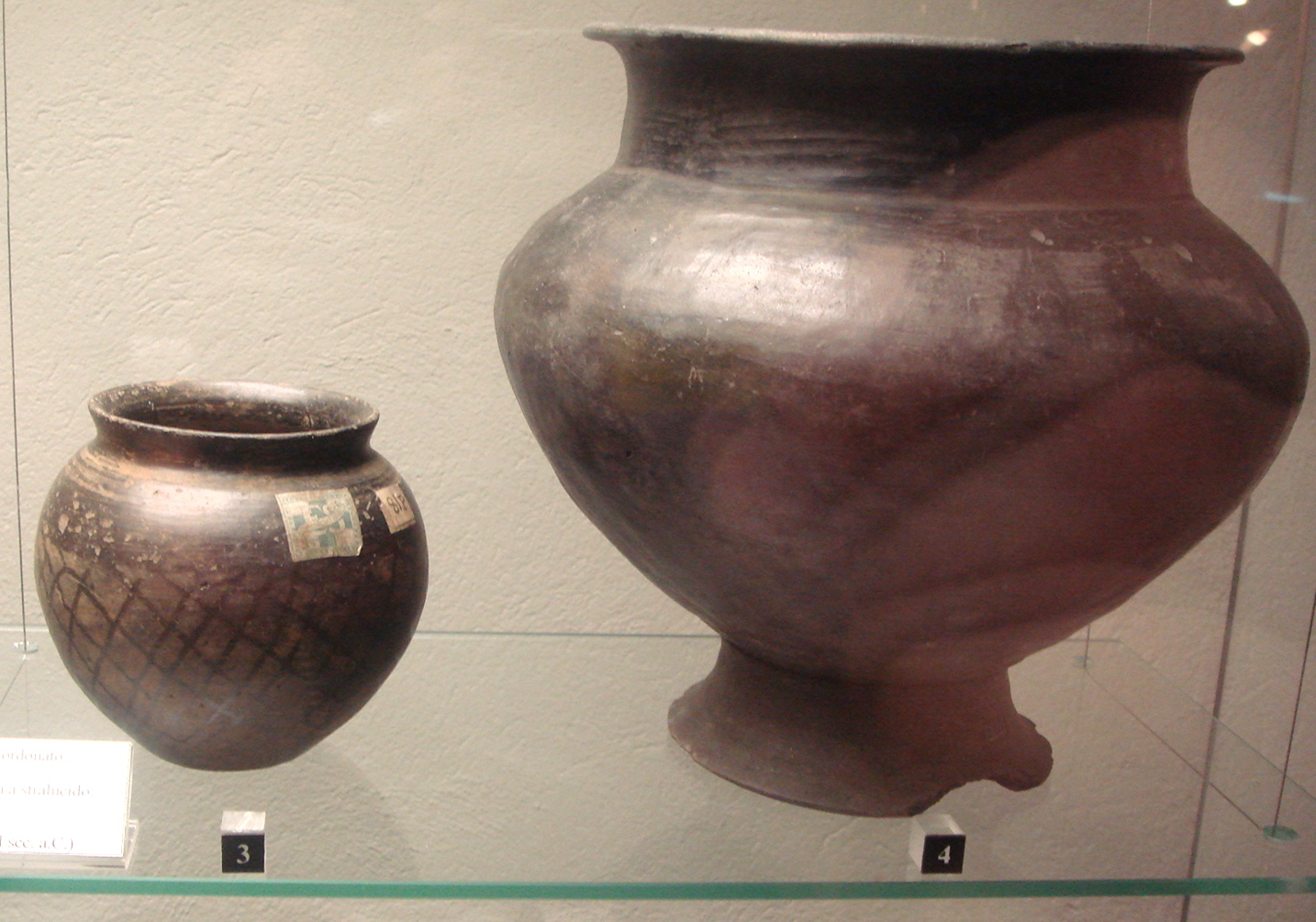

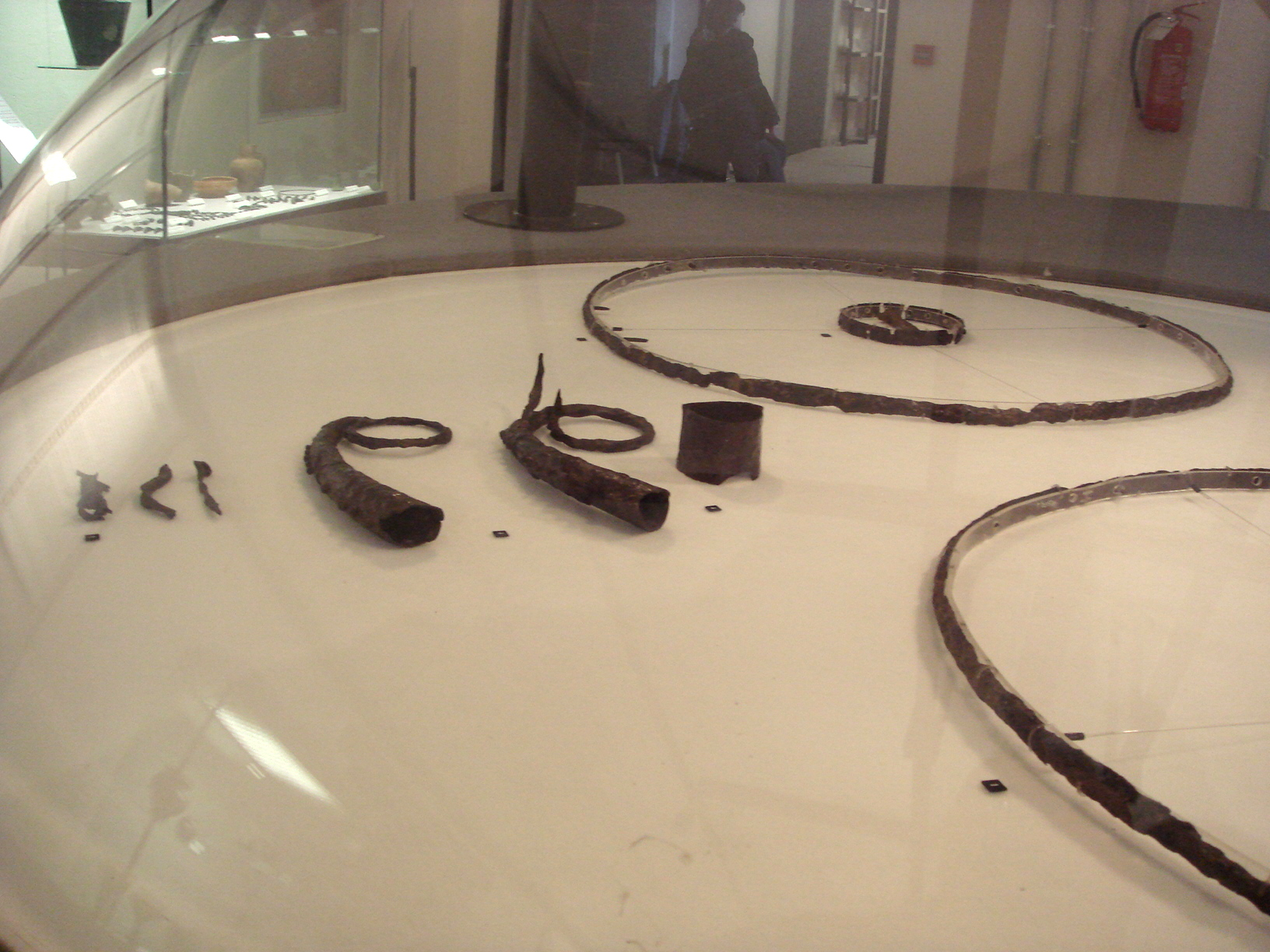
Iron chariot wheel tyres and fittings

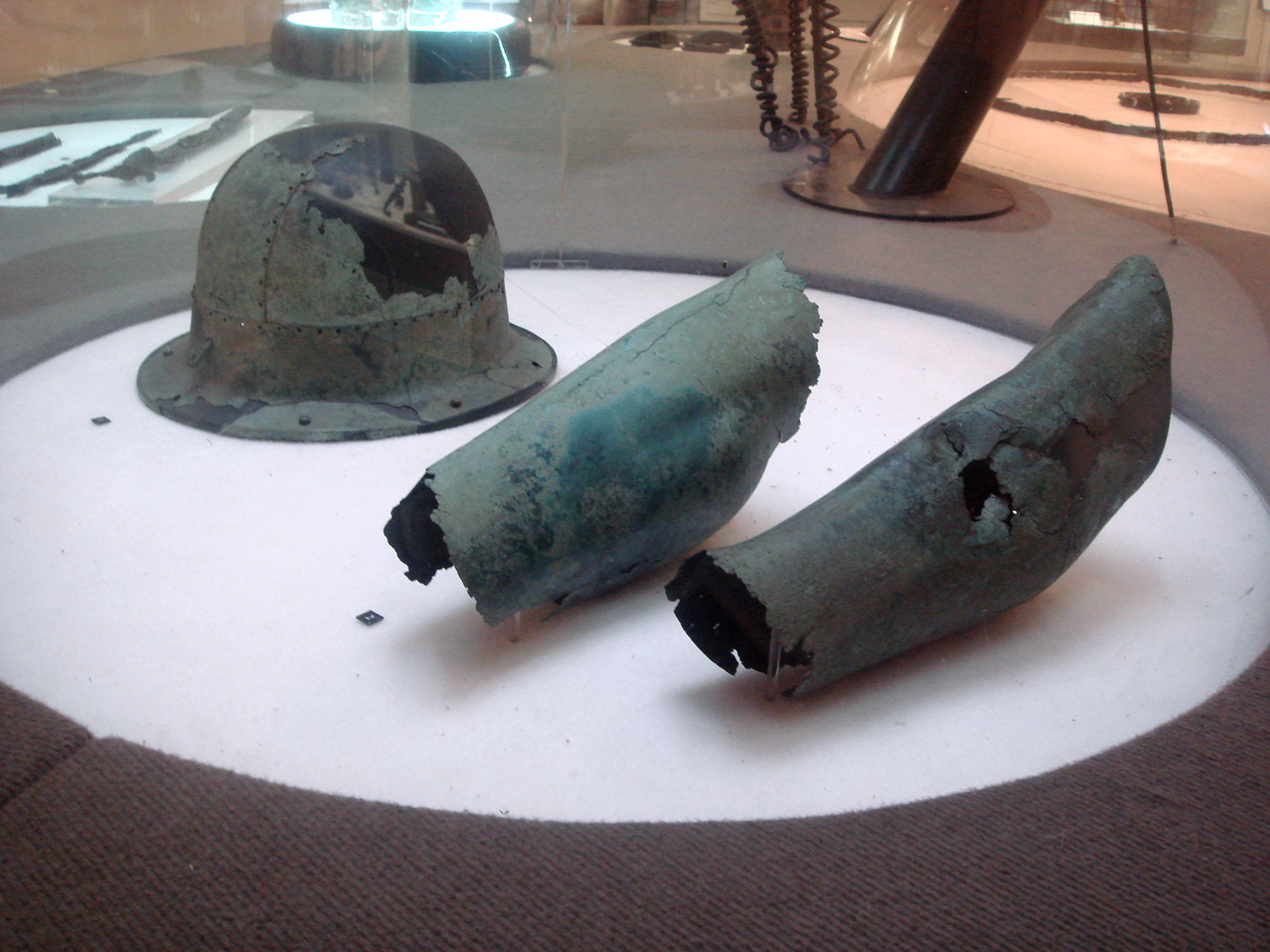

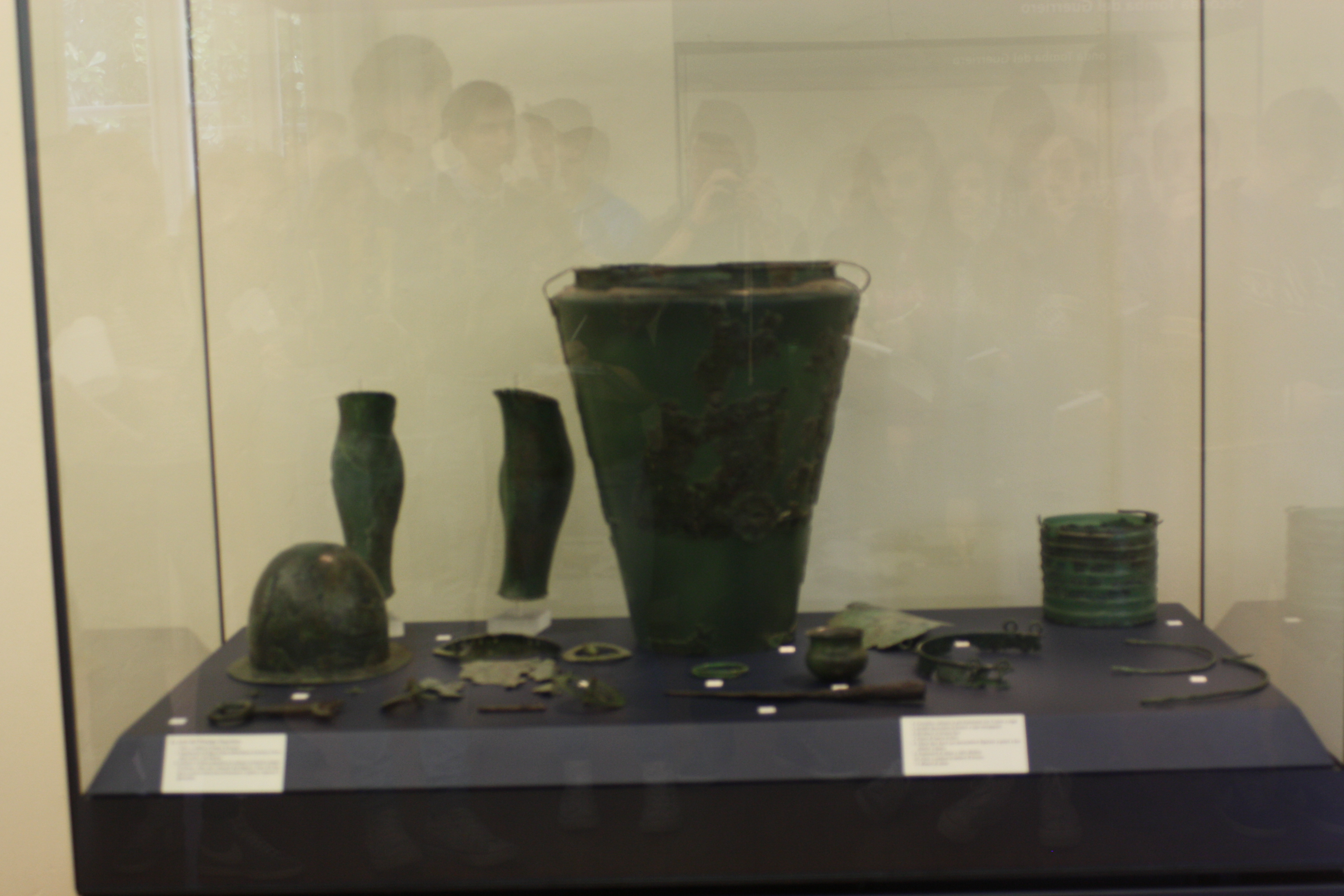
Sesto Calende grave goods, 6th c. BC

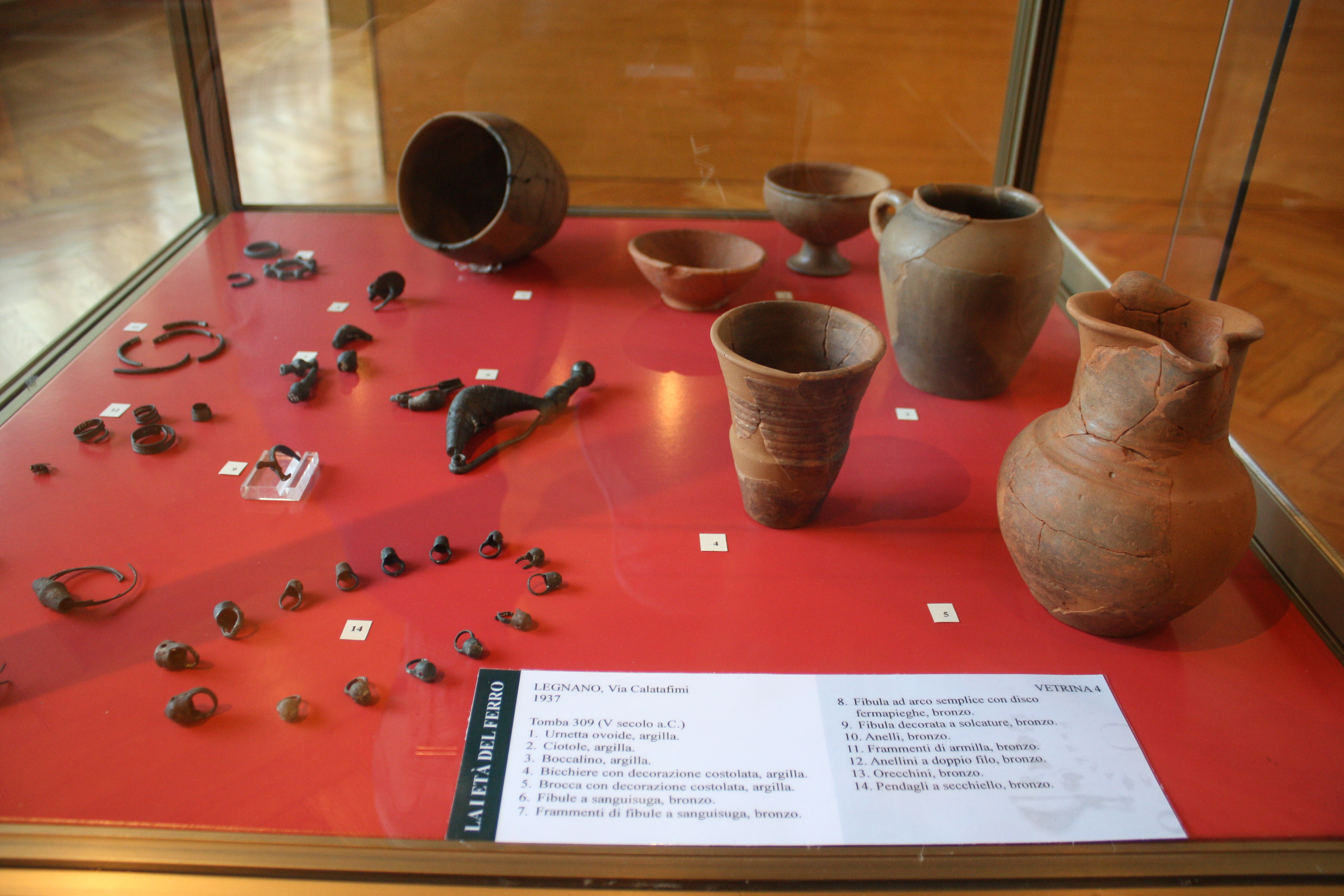
Grave goods, 5th c. BC

== See also ==
- Ancient peoples of Italy
- Canegrate culture
- Celts in the Alps and Po Valley
- Cisalpine Gaul
- Este culture
- Insubres
- Lepontii
- Prehistoric Italy
- Villanovan culture

== Sources ==
- Raffaele De Marinis (1991). "I Celti Golasecchiani". In Multiple Authors, I Celti, Bompiani.
- Raffaele De Marinis (1990). Liguri e Celto-Liguri, Officine grafiche Garzanti Milano, Garzanti-Scheiwiller
- Ludwig Pauli, 1971. Die Golaseccakultur und Mitteleuropa: Ein Beitrag zur Geschichte des Handels über die Alpen (Hamburg: Hamburger Beiträge zur Archäologie). ISBN 3-87118-085-8
- Francesca Ridgeway, in David Ridgeway, Francesca Ridgeway, eds. Italy Before the Romans (Academic Press) 1979.
