= Sesto Calende =

Sesto Calende Sest
- Comune
- Comune di Sesto Calende
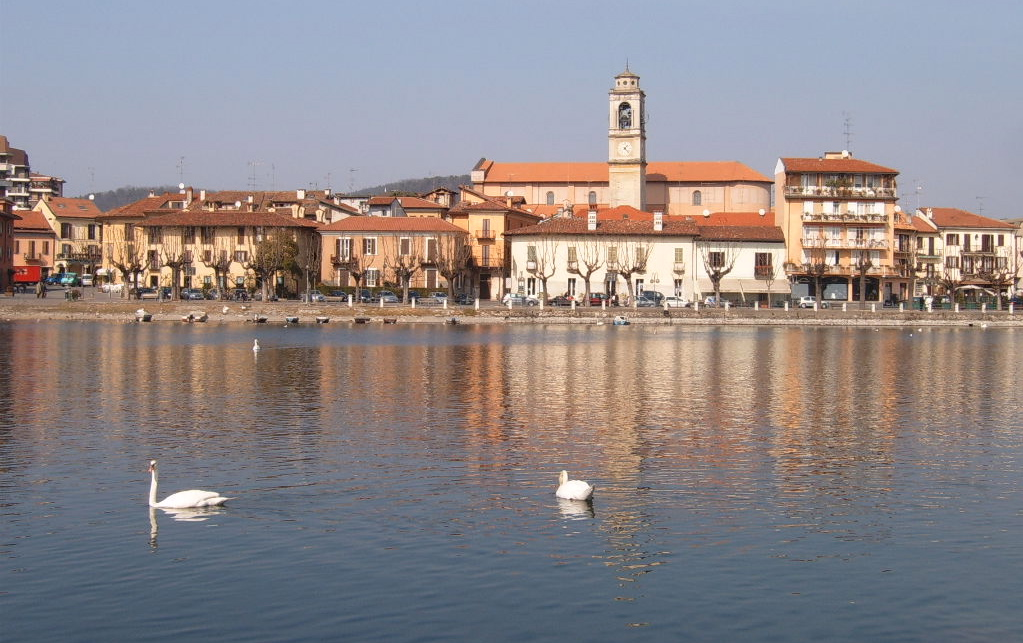

- Coat of arms

- Location within Italy Location within Lombardy
- Coordinates: 45°44′N 08°38′E
- Country: Italy
- Region: Lombardy
- Province: Varese (VA)
- Frazioni: Abbazia, Coquo, Lentate, Lisanza, Mulini, Oca, Oneda, Oriano, San Giorgio, Santa Fe', Sant'Anna

Government
  - Mayor: Giovanni Buzzi

Area
  - Total: 25.04 km^{2} (9.67 sq mi)
- Elevation: 198 m (650 ft)

Population (31 January 2022)
  - Total: 11,019
  - Density: 440.1/km^{2} (1,140/sq mi)
- Demonym: Sestesi
- Time zone: UTC+1 (CET)
  - Summer (DST): UTC+2 (CEST)
- Postal code: 21018
- Dialing code: 0331
- ISTAT code: 012120
- Patron saint: San Bernardino
- Saint day: 20 May
- Website: Official website

Sesto Calende (Lombard: Sest) is a town and comune, with around 11,019 inhabitants, located in the province of Varese, in the Lombardy region of northern Italy.

It is at the southern tip of Lake Maggiore, where the river Ticino starts to flow towards the Po. The main historical sight is the Abbey of San Donato, built in the 9th and 10th centuries. It houses a painting by Bernardino Zenale (1503).

The area around Sesto Calende is notable for archaeological finds from the Golasecca culture, including rich Iron Age tombs discovered in the 19th century that helped define this pre-Roman civilization.

It was the seat of the SIAI-Marchetti aircraft works until their takeover.

== Geographic overview ==
Sesto Calende lies beside the Ticino River and Lake Maggiore, surrounded by the Ticino Valley Park.

The town is home to many species of aquatic plants shrubs, swans, grebes, coots, and mallards.
