= Canegrate culture =

Archaeological culture in Italy

- Geographical range: North Italy
- Period: Bronze Age, Iron Age
- Dates: 13th century BC - 12th century BC
- Preceded by: Urnfield culture, Scamozzina culture
- Followed by: Golasecca culture

The Canegrate culture was a civilization of prehistoric Italy that developed in the late Bronze Age (13th century BC), in the areas that are now western Lombardy, eastern Piedmont, and Ticino. Canegrate had a cultural dynamic, as expressed in its pottery and bronzework, that was completely new to the area and was a typical example of the western Hallstatt culture. Most researchers associate the Canegrate horizon with early Celtic languages. The association between the Canegrate culture and the Celts is corroborated by the distribution of inscriptions dating back to the 6th-5th century BC which makes its Celtic nature almost certain.

The name comes from the locality of Canegrate in Lombardy, south of Legnano and 25 km north of Milan, where Guido Sutermeister discovered important archaeological finds (approximately 50 tombs with ceramics and metallic objects). The site was first excavated in 1926 in the area of Rione Santa Colomba, and systematic excavation occurred between March 1953 and autumn 1956, which led to the discovery of a necropolis of 165 tombs. It is one of the richer archeological sites of Northern Italy.

== History ==
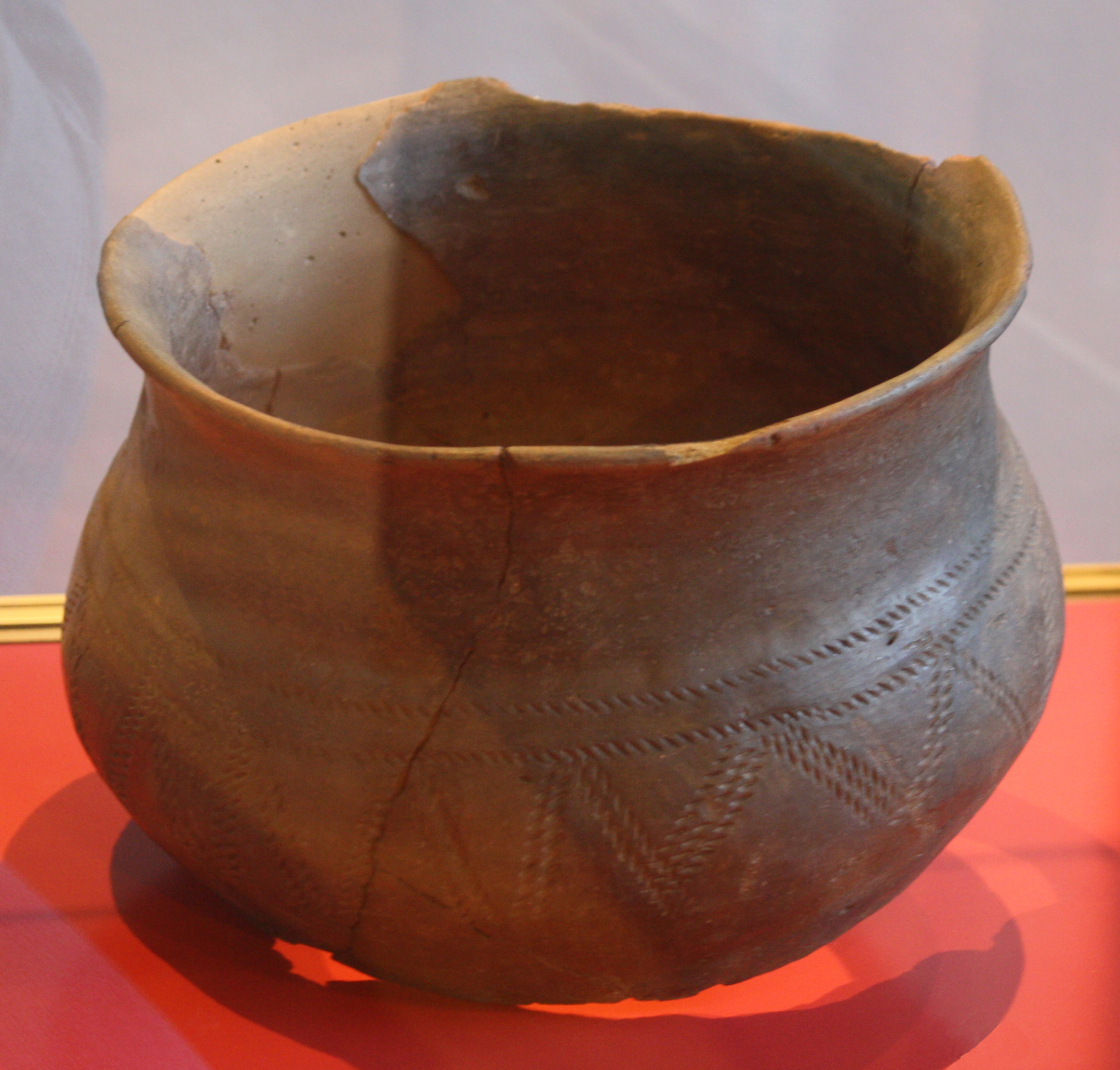
Clay bowl found at the Santa Colomba, Canegrate, in 1952. It is preserved at the Museo civico Guido Sutermeister in Legnano

The necropolis found in Canegrate is very similar to those realized in the same period in the north of Alps. It represents the first migratory wave of the Urnfield culture population from the northwest part of the Alps that, through the Alpine passes, had already penetrated and settled in the western Po valley between Lake Maggiore and Lake Como (Scamozzina culture). They brought a new funerary practice—cremation—which supplanted inhumation.

The facies of Canegrate introduces a new decorative style in ceramics that marks an almost total break with the previous Scamozzina culture; this style is linked to that of the north-western alpine area in the oldest phase of the Urnfield culture. The uniform and isolated Canegrate finds do not show any trace of the preceding Polada culture and provide no evidence for a gradual Canegrate insertion into the area, and this possibility can be completely ruled out due to the different geographical and chronological locations of the two cultures.

The bearers of the Canegrate culture maintained their homogeneity for only a century, and it then joined the Ligurian aboriginal populations; the union gave rise to the new Golasecca culture.

The origins of the Orobii, a population localized by classical writers in these areas that founded the town of Como, have been linked to the Canegrate culture.

== The necropolis ==
Diffusion of Canegrate culture

Since ancient times, the inhabitants of Olona Valley lived mainly away from the river, on higher ground that certainly would not have been affected by seasonal floods. The most significant archaeological finds, from prehistory until Roman rule, have been discovered along the edges of the Olona Valley, and the necropolis connected to the culture of Canegrate was not an exception.

The necropolis of Canegrate was brought to light in 1926 near the church of Santa Colomba. The fact that the finds did not belong to any other proto-historic culture was identified later. In 1953, other finds were found on the same land during the construction of a house; in 1956 the findings took place within the perimeter of the "Giuseppe Gajo" kindergarten, which is seven hundred meters south of the church of Santa Colomba. The first archaeological activities were directed by Guido Sutermeister, while those carried out in the 1950s were supervised by Ferrante Rittatore Vonwiller. The excavations were systematic between the spring of 1953 and the autumn of 1956.

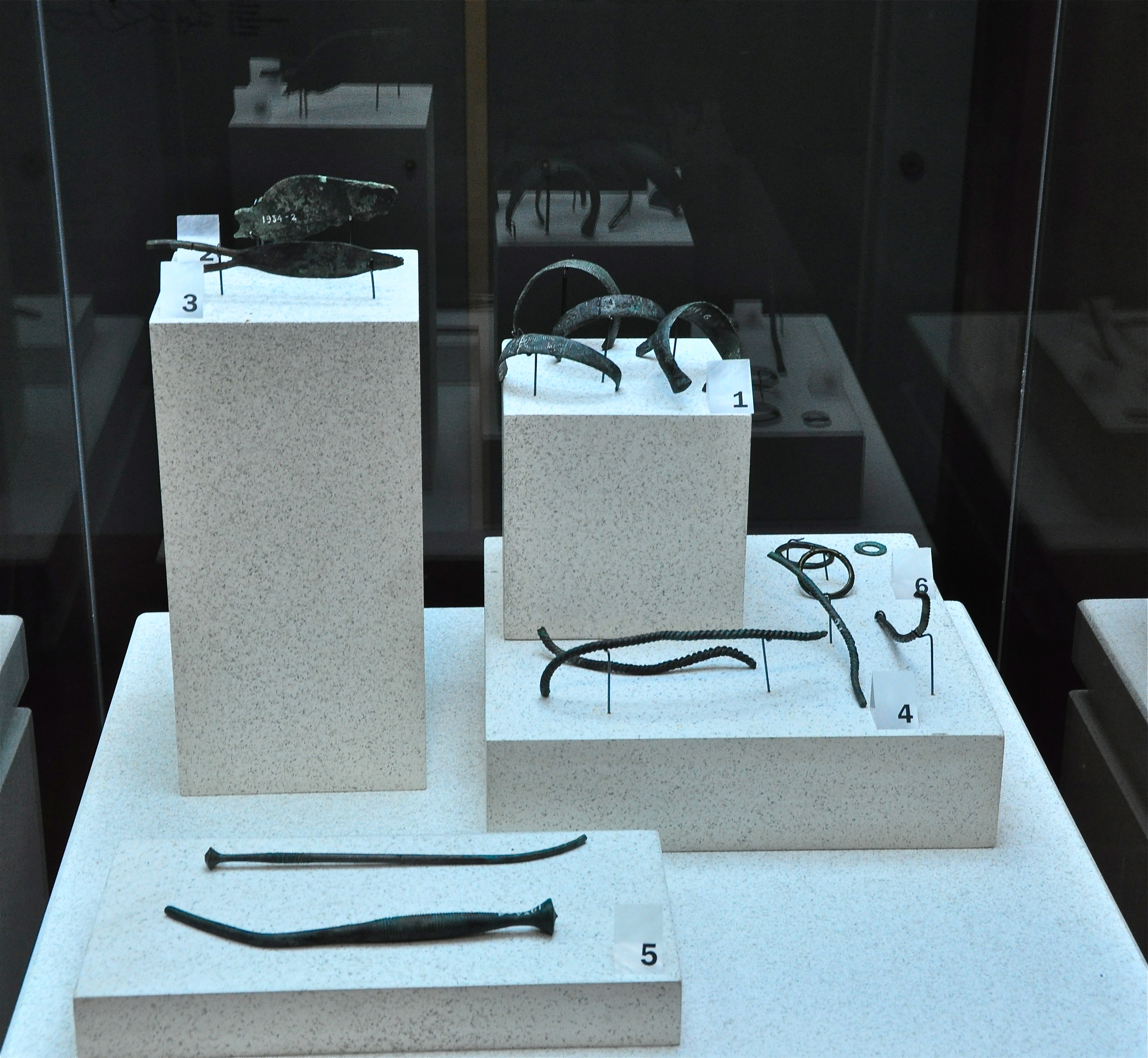
Metal artefacts

The tombs found are of the simple pit type or covered with stone or stone slabs. Most of the urns do not have a lid. Some are closed by a small stone slab, while others are turned upside down in the ground. The urns often also contain the ashes of several people. The bronze furnishings deposited with the ashes (collars, pins and rings) are not gifts to the deceased, but objects belonging to the same. The finds, in fact, have been transformed by the heat of the fire during the cremation. Not many weapons have been found. In the entire necropolis of Canegrate, only four swords have been discovered. The study of the findings revealed that about 30% of the graves received ashes from adolescents or children.

It is estimated that the necropolis should originally contain about 200 tombs, 165 of which were brought to light. The burials that were not brought to light were destroyed during the aforementioned building works. These works were stopped after verifying the importance of the finds, and this allowed the patrol of the entire area.

Given the abundance of findings, it was possible to identify the general cultural and social aspects of the populations that belonged to this prehistoric civilization. From the findings discovered in Canegrate, it can be inferred that the populations that lived there led a rather harsh existence and had a decidedly short average life. Furthermore, the rate of infant deaths was decidedly high. A certain respect for the dead can also be deduced from the rich funerary outfit. Most likely the village where the community that built the two necropolises lived was not far from the find. The presence of two rather close necropolises and the discovery of similar discoveries in the area, could suggest the presence of several villages at a relatively short distance. Remains of dwellings of populations belonging to the culture the Canegrates were discovered in Gabinella in Legnano. During the excavations, which took place in the mid-1980s, furnishings from the late Bronze Age (mostly vessel fragments) were also brought to light.

Small necropolises belonging to the Canegrate culture have also been discovered in Appiano Gentile, Ligurno, Canton Ticino (Gudo, Rovio, Locarno, Giubiasco and Bellinzona), in the Novarese (Novara, Vicolungo and Castelletto sopra Ticino) and in Verbano (Premeno).

The most novel element is precisely the ceramics, which, although it has some point of contact with the previous Scamozzina culture, on the whole is clearly differentiated by connecting directly with the Urnfield culture and, in particular, to the groups of the Rhine-Switzerland-Eastern France area. The contribution of the culture of the Urnfields is particularly emphasized by the shape and decorations of the urns, as well as by the composition of the alloy in the bronzes of the funeral objects.

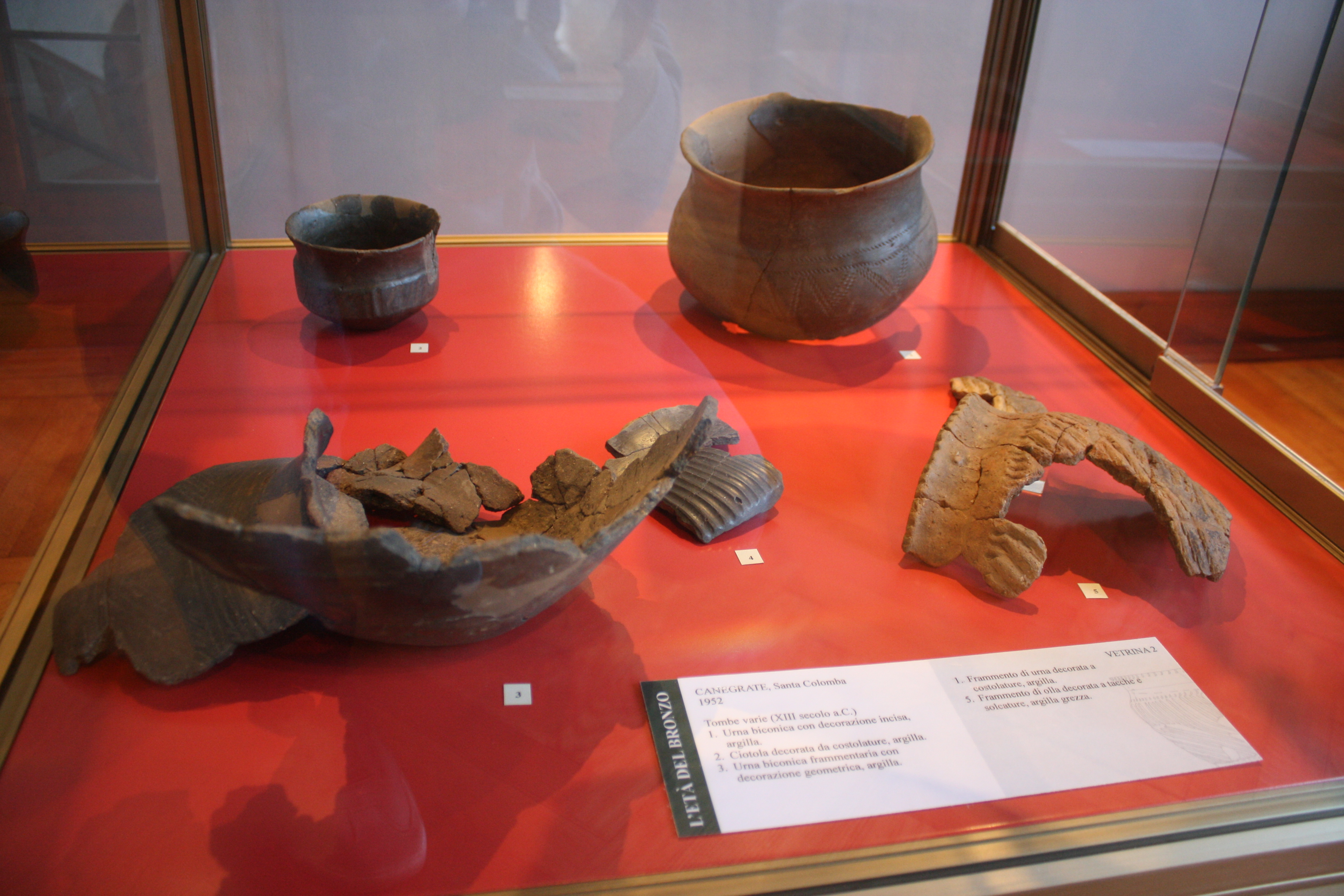
Finds of Canegrate culture from Santa Colomba, Canegrate (1953)

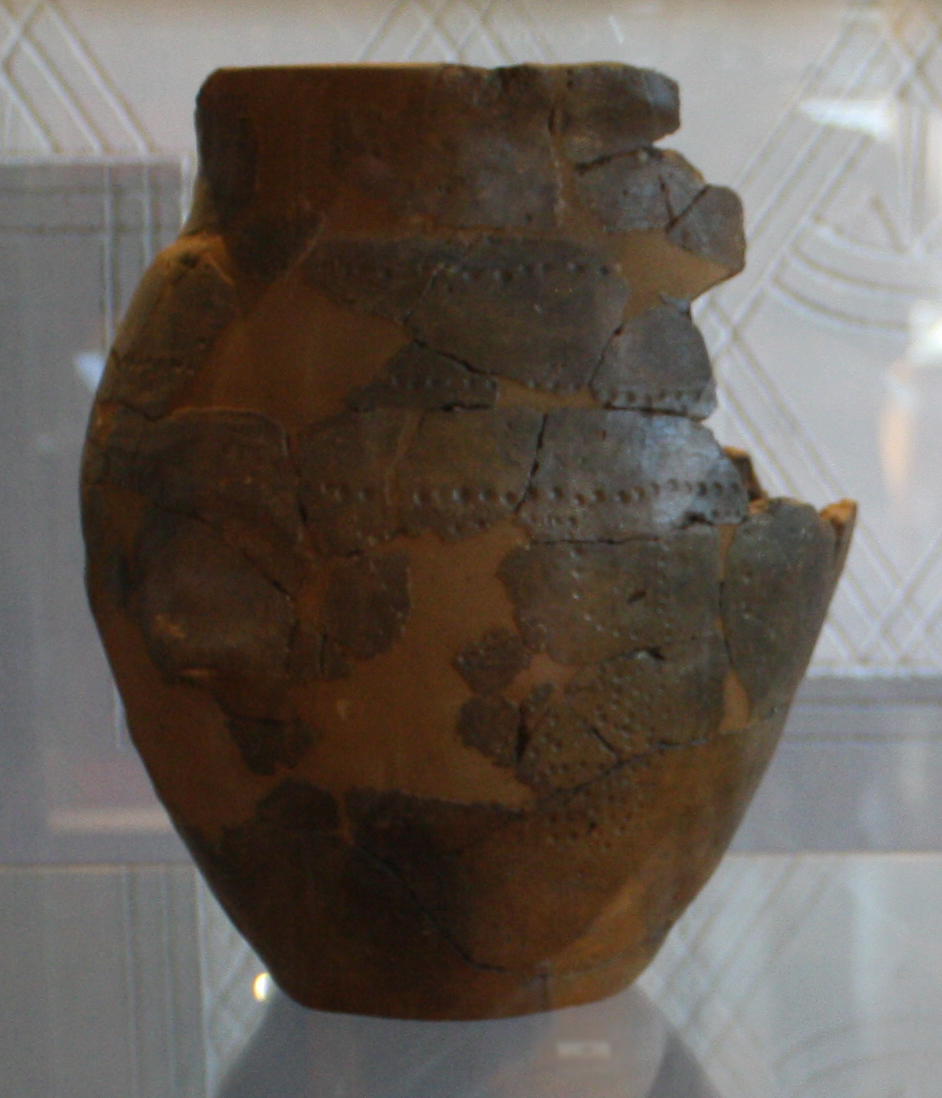
Olla in clay with embossed decoration found at the Santa Colomba, Canegrate, in 1926

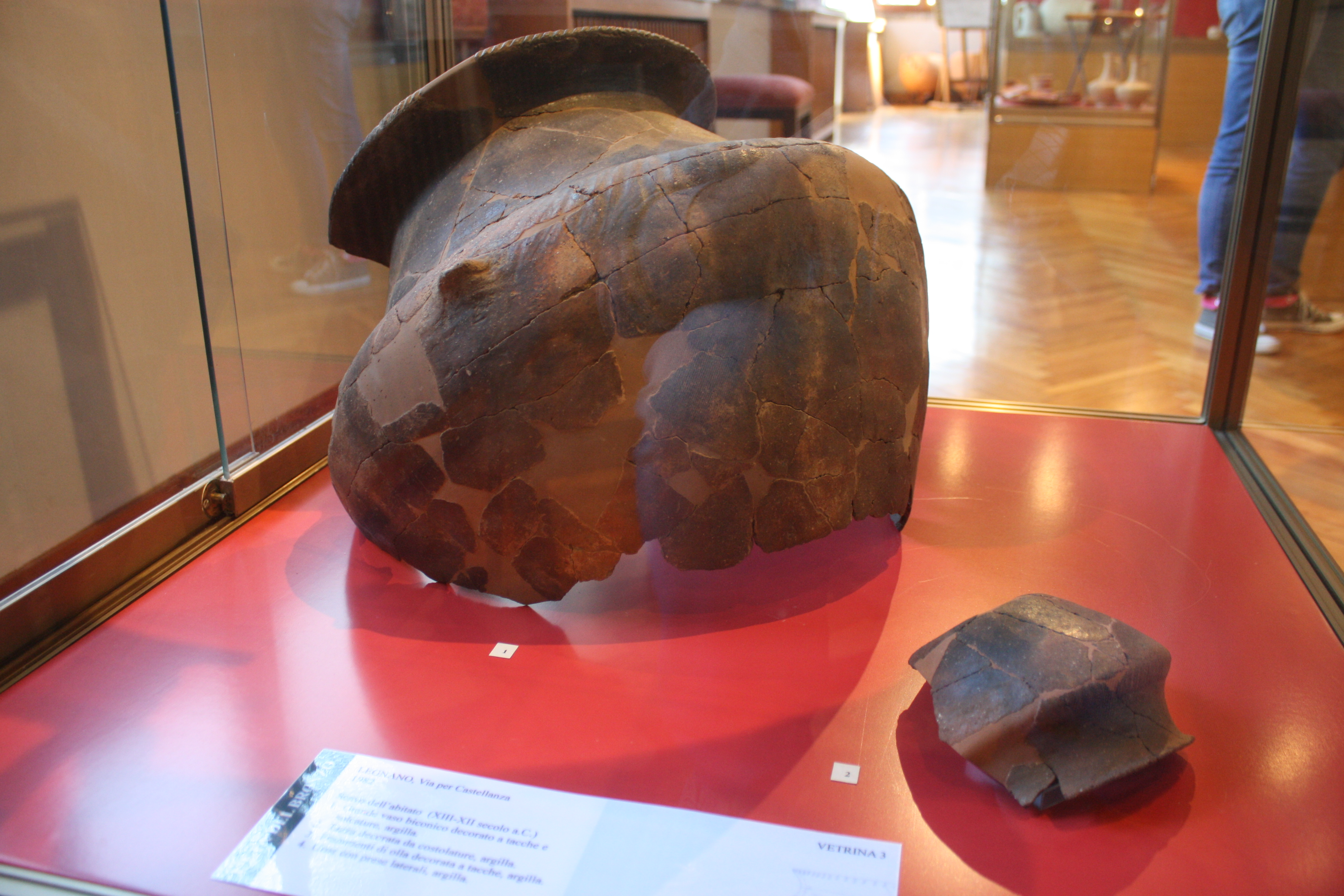
Ceramic vessel

== See also ==
- Canegrate
- Scamozzina culture
- Polada culture
- Villanovan culture
- Golasecca culture
- Este culture
- Ancient peoples of Italy

== Sources ==
- Agnoletto, Attilo (1992). San Giorgio su Legnano – storia, società, ambiente (in Italian). SBN IT\ICCU\CFI\0249761.
- Corbella, Roberto: Celti: itinerari storici e turistici tra Lombardia, Piemonte, Svizzera, Macchione, Varese 2000; ISBN 88-8340-030-5
- Corbella, Roberto: Magia e mistero nella terra dei Celti: Como, Varesotto, Ossola; Macchione, Varese 2004; ISBN 88-8340-186-7
- D'Aversa, Arnaldo: La Valle Padana tra Etruschi, Celti e Romani, Paideia, Brescia 1986ISBN 88-394-0381-7
- De Marinis, Raffaele (1991). "I Celti Golasecchiani". In Multiple Authors, I Celti, Bompiani.
- De Marinis, Raffaele (1990). Liguri e Celto-Liguri, Officine grafiche Garzanti Milano, Garzanti-Scheiwiller
- De Marinis, Raffaele (2009). "La protostoria del territorio di Varese: dall'inizio dell'età dei metalli al periodo della romanizzazione", in "Alle origini di Varese e del suo territorio", L'erma di Bretschneider, Roma 2009, pp. 11–30
- Di Maio, Paola (1998). Lungo il fiume. Terre e genti nell'antica valle dell'Olona. Corsico: Teograf.
- Giorgio D'Ilario, Egidio Gianazza, Augusto Marinoni, Marco Turri, Profilo storico della città di Legnano, Edizioni Landoni, 1984
- Grassi, Maria Teresa: I Celti in Italia, Longanesi, Milan 1991 ISBN 88-304-1012-8
- Kruta, Venceslas: I celti e il Mediterraneo, Jaca Book, 2004, ISBN 88-16-43628-X, ISBN 978-88-16-43628-2
- Kruta, Venceslas: La grande storia dei celti. La nascita, l'affermazione e la decadenza, Newton & Compton, 2003, ISBN 88-8289-851-2, ISBN 978-88-8289-851-9
- Kruta, Venceslas and Valerio Massimo Manfredi: I celti d'Italia, Mondadori, 2000, ISBN 88-04-47710-5, ISBN 9788804477105
- Violante, Antonio: I Celti a sud delle Alpi, Silvana, Milan, 1993 ISBN 88-366-0442-0
