= Scamozzina culture =

The Scamozzina culture (Italian Cultura della Scamozzina), which takes its name from the necropolis found in Cascina Scamozzina of Albairate, was a prehistoric civilization of Italy that developed between the end of the middle Bronze Age and the beginning of the late Bronze Age (14th and 13th century BC), in western Lombardy and Piedmont.

It was located in an area that is generally defined as ethnically Ligurian and it introduced some cultural characteristics more specific to the subsequent proto-Celtic Culture of Canegrate.

Among the evidences of this culture there is a cremation tomb, dating to the late Bronze Age (13th century BC.) found at Guado di Gugnano, Casaletto Lodigiano in February 1876, during the flatworks in a field near the Lisone.

The Scamozzina culture, clearly distinct from the coeval Terramare culture, saw the establishment of the funeral rite of cremation in which also a set of ornaments was deposed with the bones in the cinerary urn, an early phenomenon, ahead of other Italian regions but also of most of Europe who knew of this development only from the earliest phases of the Urnfield culture.

One of the favorite motifs in the decoration of the Scamozzina pottery is that of two strips of triangles arranged with the top hatch opposed to form a zig-zag band. Characteristic is also the spread of the decoration technique with fake strings.

It is assumed that the buildings of this culture were made in wood, straw and clay.

== Sources ==
- Raffaele de Marinis, Liguri e Celto-Liguri in Italia. Omniun terrarum alumna, Garzanti-Scheiwiller, 1988, 724 pp.gg.

== See also ==
- Canegrate culture
- Prehistoric Italy
