= List of Italic peoples =

This list of ancient Italic peoples includes names of Indo-European peoples speaking Italic languages or otherwise considered Italic in sources from the late early 1st millennium BC to the early 1st millennium AD.

== Ancestors ==
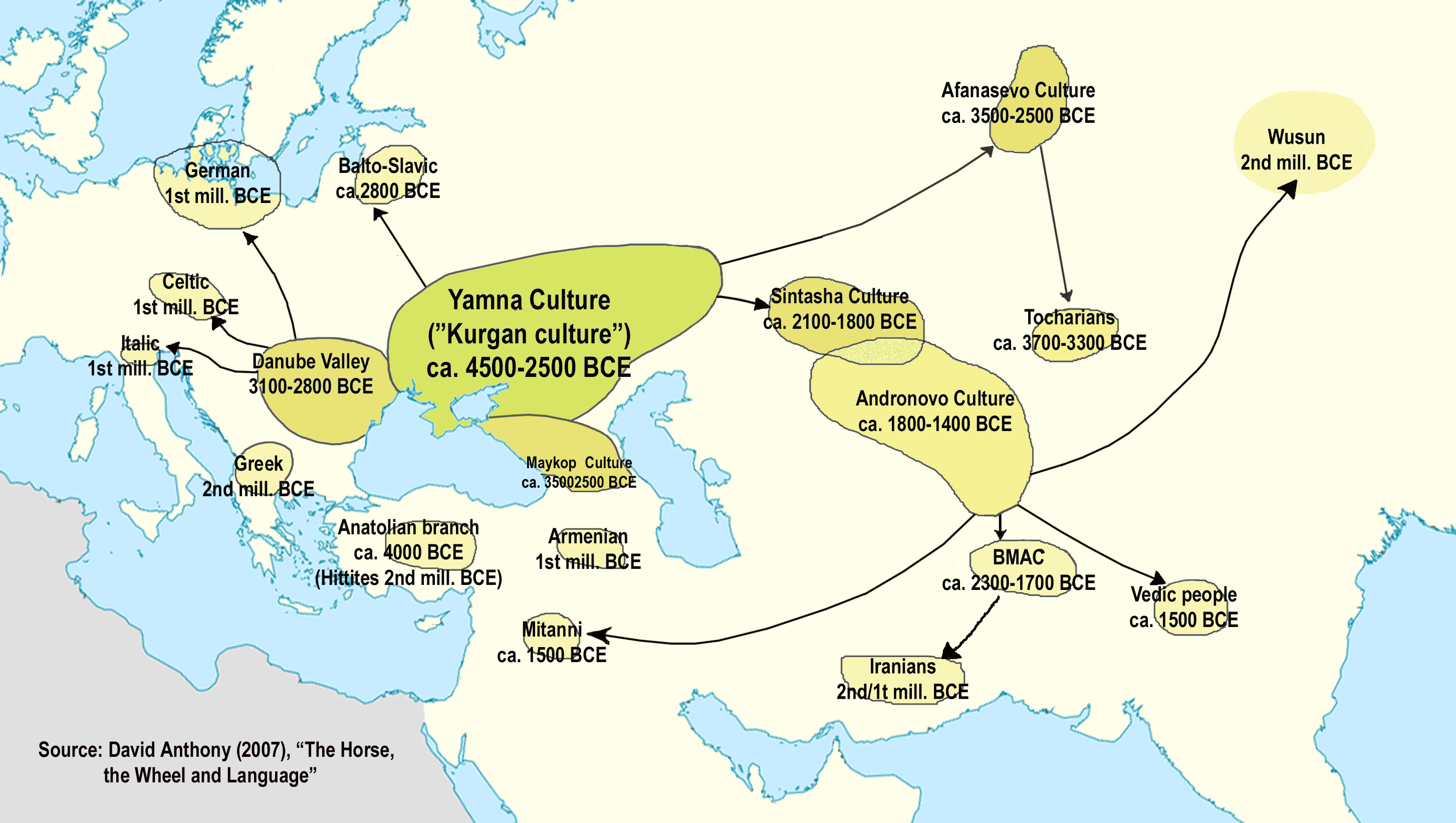
Map 1: Indo-European migrations as described in The Horse, the Wheel, and Language by David W. Anthony

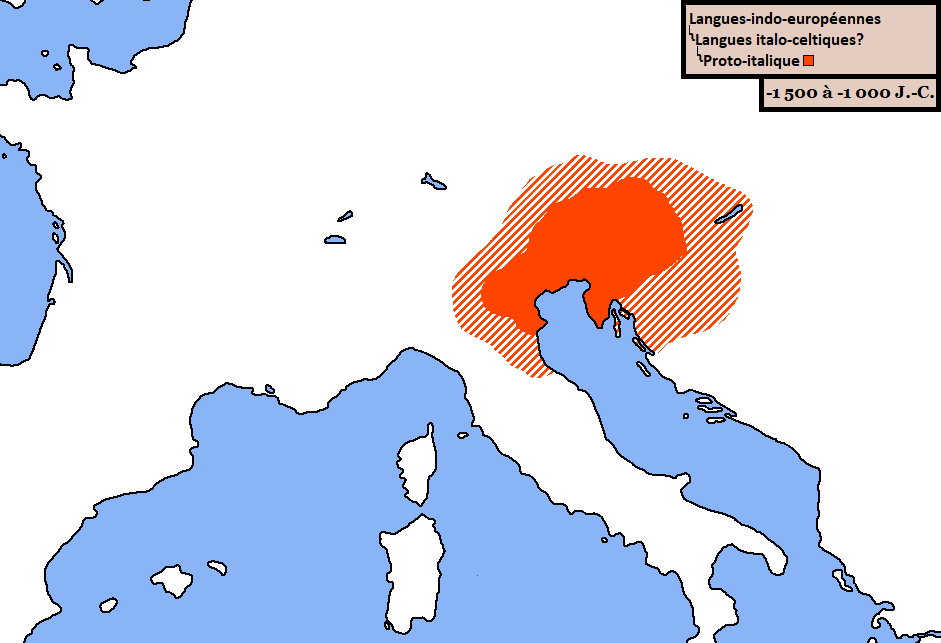
Map 2: Possible area of origin and migration route of Proto-Italic speaking people towards Italian Peninsula

Map 3: Ethnicities of today's Italy in 400 BC. The Italic tribes lived at this point in the south-central part of the Italian Peninsula.

Map 4: Ethnolinguistic map of Italy in the Iron Age, before the Roman expansion and conquest of Italy

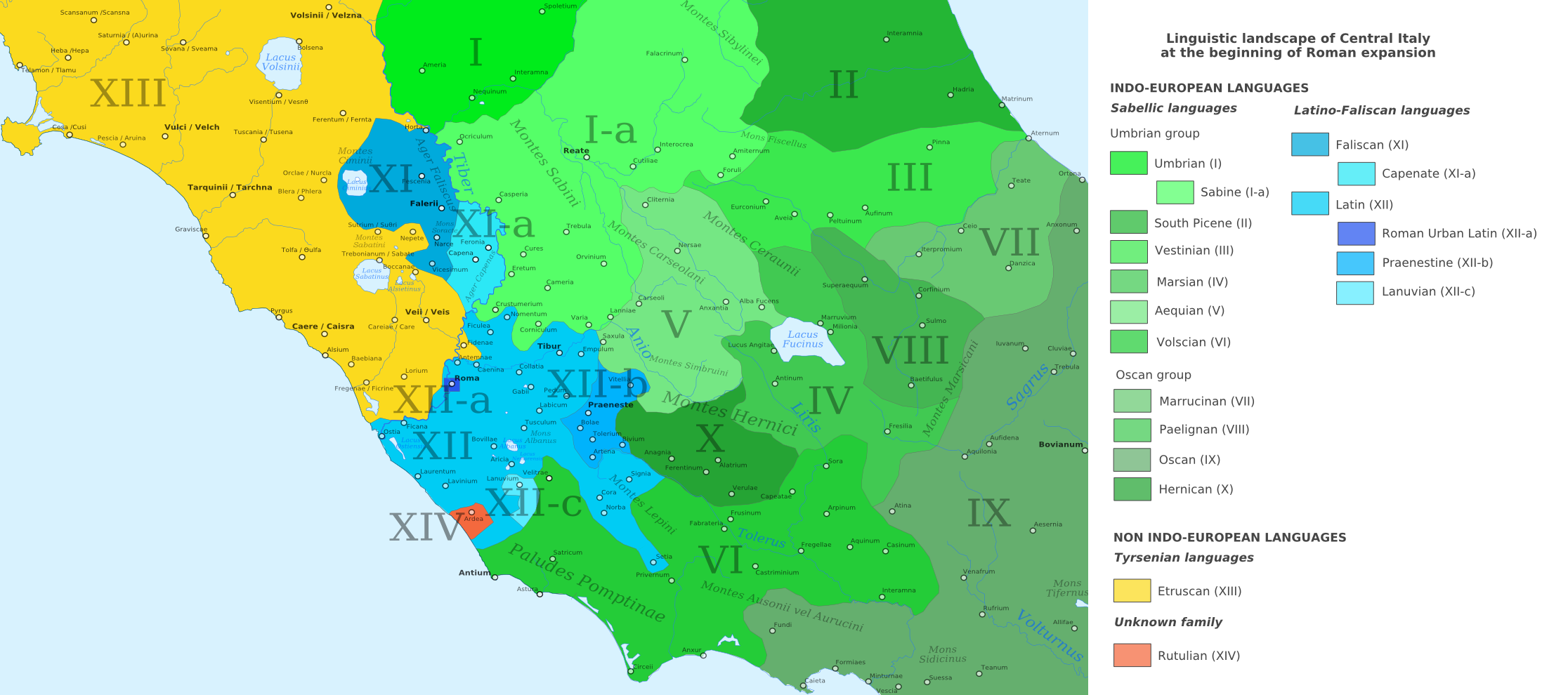
Map 5: The linguistic and peoples landscape of Central Italy at the beginning of Roman expansion

- Proto-Indo-Europeans (Proto-Indo-European speakers)
  - Proto-Italics (Proto-Italic speakers)

== Latino-Faliscans ==
- Falisci
  - Capenates (in Capena and Ager Capenas, Capena land)
  - Falerii (in Falerii and Ager Faliscus)
  - Sardinia Falisci (in and around Peronia, northeastern Sardinia)
- Aborigines (mythology) (Casci Latini) - Latium Sicels
  - Prisci Latini (Old Latins) (according to tradition and legend they were formed by the merger of Aborigines and Latium Sicels)
    - Latini (Latins (Italic tribe))
      - Abolani, mentioned by Pliny the Elder as a people who partook in a ceremony atop the Alban Hills. Pliny mentions that they had supposedly disappeared without a trace by his lifetime.
      - Aesulani
      - Acienses
      - Albans (Albani) (Populi Albenses) (in Alba Longa Land, between the modern-day Lake Albano and Monte Cavo)
      - Antemnates (in Antemnae) (sometimes regarded as Sabines)
      - Bolani / Bovillani
      - Bubetani
      - Cusuetani (originally Latin tribe that was conquered and assimilated by the Volsci)
      - Coriolani, Old / Old Coriolani (originally Latin tribe that was conquered and assimilated by the Volsci)
      - Ficani (in Ficana Land)
      - Latin Fidenates (originally Latin tribe that was conquered and assimilated by the Etruscans, for some centuries Fidenates were Etruscans - the Fidenates Etruscans, however in the 8th century BC, Rome, after a war with Veii and Fidenae, conquered Fidenae and established a Roman Latin colony there - Fidenae Novae, and the Fidenae land was Latinized again)
      - Foreti / Foretii
      - Hortenses
      - Latinienses / Romans (Romani) (Ancient Romans) (originally in Rome and Ager Romanus or Ager Latinienses, Roman land, later throughout the Roman Empire)
        - Roman tribes (originally there were three tribes: Luceres, Ramnes and Tities, later with Roman expansion increased to 35)
          - Roman gentes (sing. gens - clan) (originally they were only Roman Latins, but later, with Roman expansion, several clans of other peoples were also included, such as the Sabines, Etruscans and other Italics)
      - Longulani (originally Latin tribe that was conquered and assimilated by the Volsci)
      - Macrales
      - Manates
      - Munienses
      - Mutucumenses
      - Numinienses
      - Octulani
      - Olliculani
      - Pedani
      - Polluscini (originally Latin tribe that was conquered and assimilated by the Volsci)
      - Querquetulani
      - Sicani, Latium (Latium Sicani) (not to be confused with the Sicily's Sicani)
      - Sisolenses
      - Tolerienses (in Toleria or Tolerium Land)
      - Tutienses
      - Velienses
      - Venetulani, Latium / Latium Venetulani (may have been an originally Venetian tribe that was Latinized and assimilated)
      - Vimitellarii
      - Vitellenses
- Opici

== Osco-Umbrians / Sabellians ==
- Umbrians
  - Aequi
  - Hernici
  - Marsi
  - Praetutii (in Ager Praetutianus, their name gave origin to the name of Abruzzo region)
  - Sabines (Sabini)
  - South Picentes/South Picenes (Pupeneis)
  - Volsci
- Oscans
  - Alfaterni (in Salerno region)
  - Aurunci (may have been the same people as the Ausones but with a different cognate name; Rhotacism: s > r)
  - Ausones (may have been the same people as the Aurunci but with a different cognate name)
  - Campani
  - Frentani (sometimes classified as Samnites, whom they were originally descended from)
  - Lucanians
  - Bruttii
  - Marrucini
  - Paeligni
  - Picentini (in Picentini Mounts)
  - Samnites (Safineis)
    - Caraceni
    - Caudini
    - Hirpini
    - Pentri
  - Sidicini
  - Vestini

== Other possible Italic peoples ==
- Elymi (Elymians)
- Oenotri (Oenotrians)
  - Italiotes
  - Morgetes
  - Sicels (Siculi)
- Rutuli
- Sicani

=== Veneti ===
Usually they are included as an Italic people by many scholars. However other scholars argue that they could have been a transitional people between Celts and Italics, a Celticized Italic people or a Para-Celtic people.

- Carni? (may have been a Celtic tribe)
- Catali
- Catari
- Histri
- Iapydes
- Liburni
  - Alutae (chief town: Aluus or Aloiis)
  - Assesiates
  - Buni
  - Burnistae
  - Caulici
  - Curictae (on the island of Curicta, now Krk)
  - Encheleae
  - Fertinates
  - Flanates (chief town: Flanona, which gave name to the Sinus Flanaticus)
  - Hymani (or Ismeni)
  - Hythmitae
  - Lacinienses
  - Lopsi (chief town: Lopsica, now Sveti Juraj)
  - Mentores
  - Olbonenses
  - Peucetiae
  - Stlupini
  - Syopii
  - Varvarini (chief town: Varvaria)
- Secusses
- Subocrini
- Veneti Proper
- Venetulani

== See also ==
- Prehistoric Italy
- Italic peoples
- List of Roman tribes
- List of Roman gentes
- List of ancient peoples of Italy
- List of ancient Greek tribes
