= List of ancient peoples of Italy =

Ethnolinguistic map of Italy in the Iron Age, before the Roman expansion and conquest of Italy

This list of ancient peoples living in Italy summarises all the different Italian populations that existed in antiquity; in historiography, they are generally referred to as the "Italic peoples" (in linguistics, this term has a stricter meaning and refers specifically to the sub-group of Indo-Europeans consisting of the Latino-Faliscans and Osco-Umbrians). Among these peoples, the Romans succeeded in Romanizing the entire Italian peninsula following the Roman expansion in Italy, which provides the time-window in which most of the names of the remaining ancient Italian peoples first appear in existing written documentation. Many names are exonyms assigned by the ancient writers of works in ancient Greek and Latin, while others are scholarly inventions.

Nearly all of these peoples and tribes spoke Indo-European languages: Italic languages, Celtic, Ancient Greek, in addition to intermediate positions between these language groups. On the other hand, some Italian peoples (such as the Rhaetians, Camuni, Etruscans) likely spoke non- or pre-Indo-European languages. In addition, peoples speaking languages of the Afro-Asiatic family, specifically the largely Semitic Phoenicians and Carthaginians, settled and colonized parts of western and southern Sardinia and western Sicily.

== Speakers of non-Indo-European languages ==
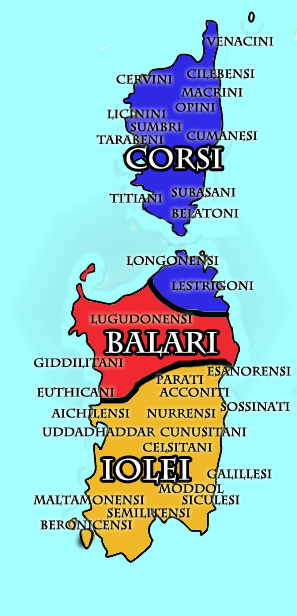
Ancient Sardinian and Corsican tribes described by the Romans.

Scholars believe - though sometimes on the basis of scanty evidence - that the following peoples spoke non-Indo-European languages. Some of them were Pre-Indo-Europeans or Paleo-Europeans while, with regard to some others, Giacomo Devoto proposed the definition of Peri-Indo-European (i.e. everything that has hybrid characters between Indo-European and non-Indo-European).

=== Sardinians ===
- The Sardinians were possibly Sherden.
- Balares (Balari)
- Ilienses/Iolaes/Diagesbes (Iliensi/Iolei)
- Corsi (Possibly related to Ligures)

=== Tyrrhenians ===
The Tyrrhenians were the Etruscans and their linguistic relatives.

- Etruscans – centered in Etruria with later influences stretching from the Po Valley to Campania.
- Raeti
- Camunni

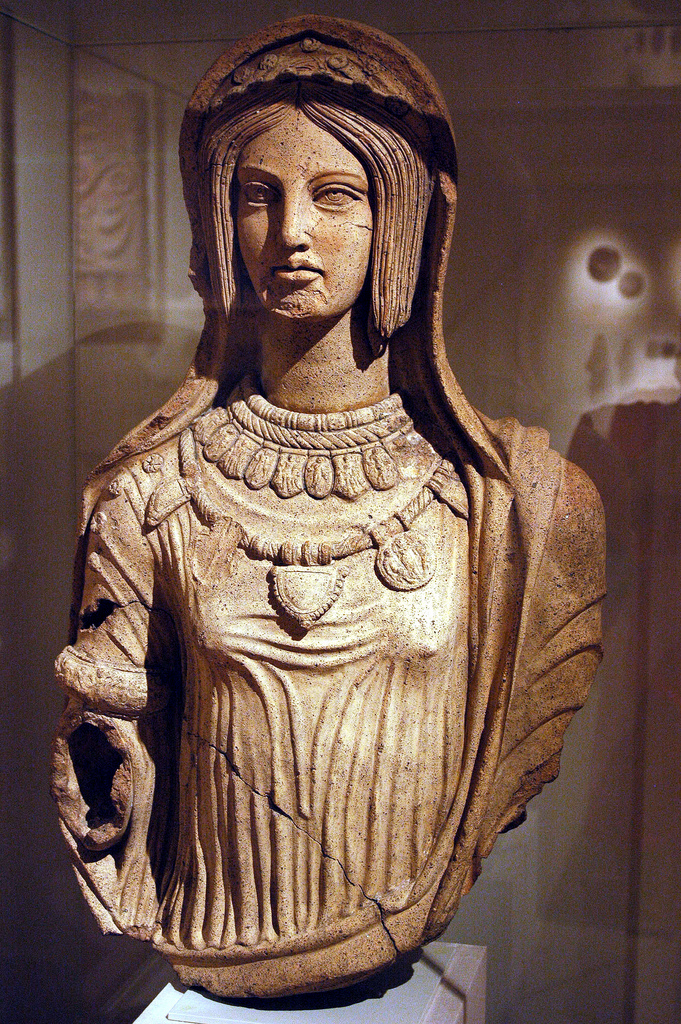
Terracotta statue of a young woman, late 4th–early 3rd century B.C., Etruscan Terracotta

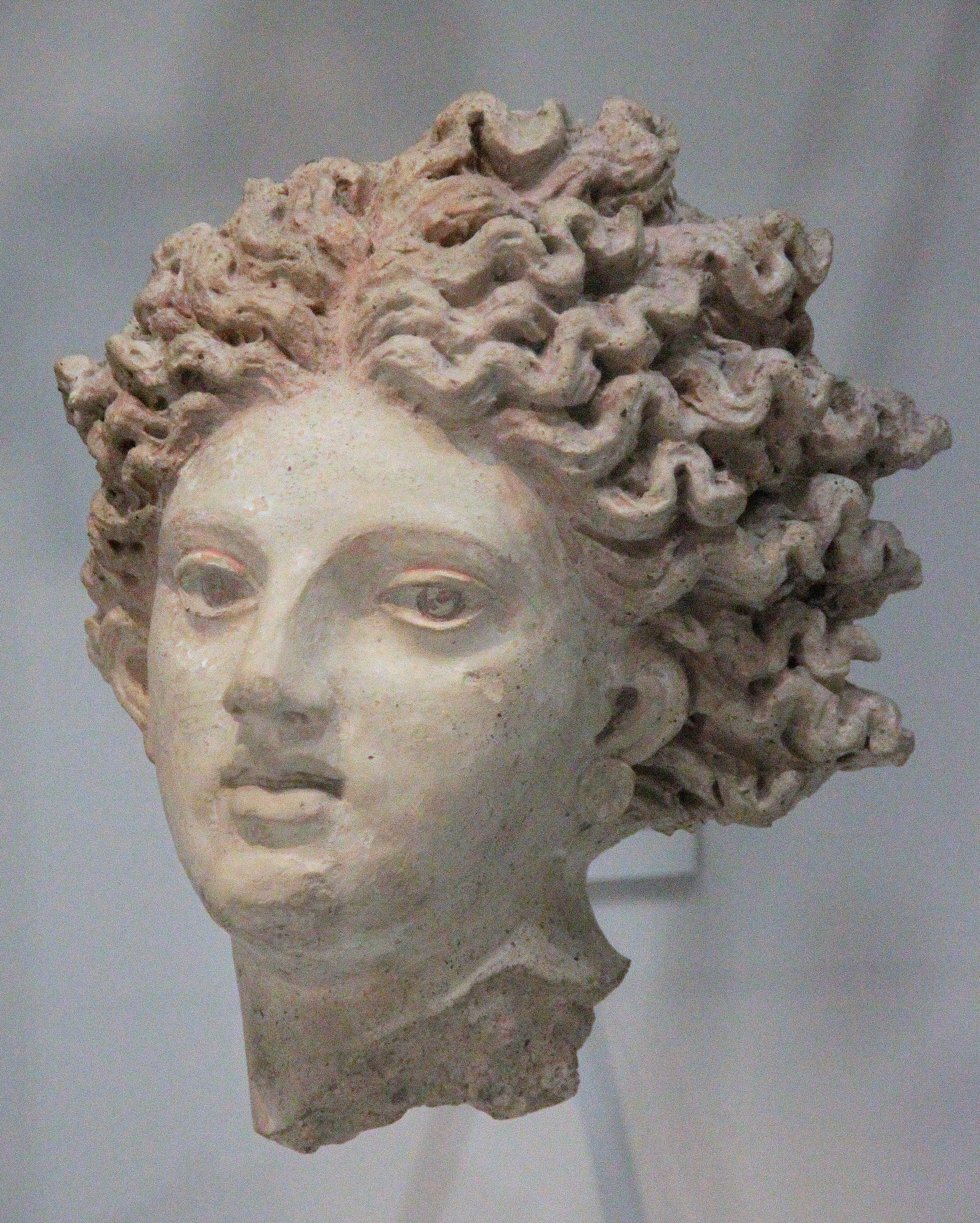
Etruscan terracotta head

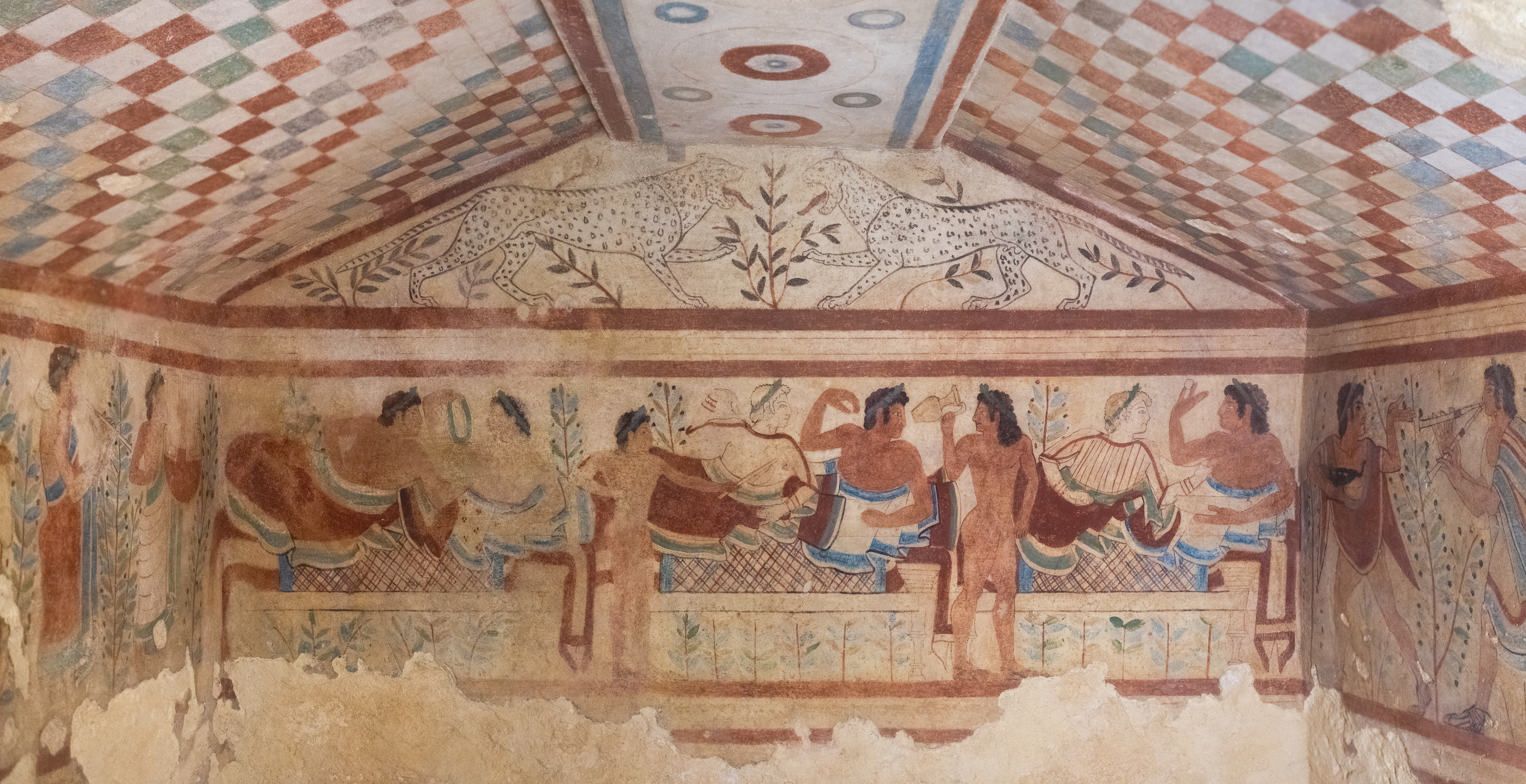
Tarquinia Tomb of the Leopards

=== Others (classification uncertain) ===
- North Picenes - Centered on the Adriatic Coast with settlements around the region of Ancona.
- Rutuli
- Sicani
- Ligures

== Speakers of Indo-European languages ==
- Proto-Indo-Europeans

=== Italo-Celtic ===
Italic and Celtic languages are commonly grouped together on the basis of features shared by these two branches and no others. This could imply that they are descended from a common ancestor and/or Proto-Celtic and Proto-Italic developed in close proximity over a long period of time.

==== Italic ====
Speakers of Italic languages included:

- Latino-Faliscans
  - Latins- centered around the central plain of Italy between the Tiber and the Alban Hills.
    - Romans- centered in the city of Rome.
  - Falisci

The map shows the most important archaeological sites of Sicily related to pre-Hellenic cultures, as well as the possible extent of the cultures of the Elymians, Sicani and Sicels.

- Sicels
- Adriatic Veneti - centered in an area corresponding to the modern-day region of Veneto.
  - Carni
  - Catali
  - Catari
  - Histri
  - Liburnians
    - Lopsi
  - Secusses
  - Venetulani
- Umbri - Centered in central Italy stretching from the Adriatic coast to the upper Tiber.
  - Sabines - Centered north of Rome and by the river Tiber.
  - Marsi - Centered around Lake Fucinus
  - Volsci - Centered on the Pontine plain
  - South Picenes
  - Marrucini

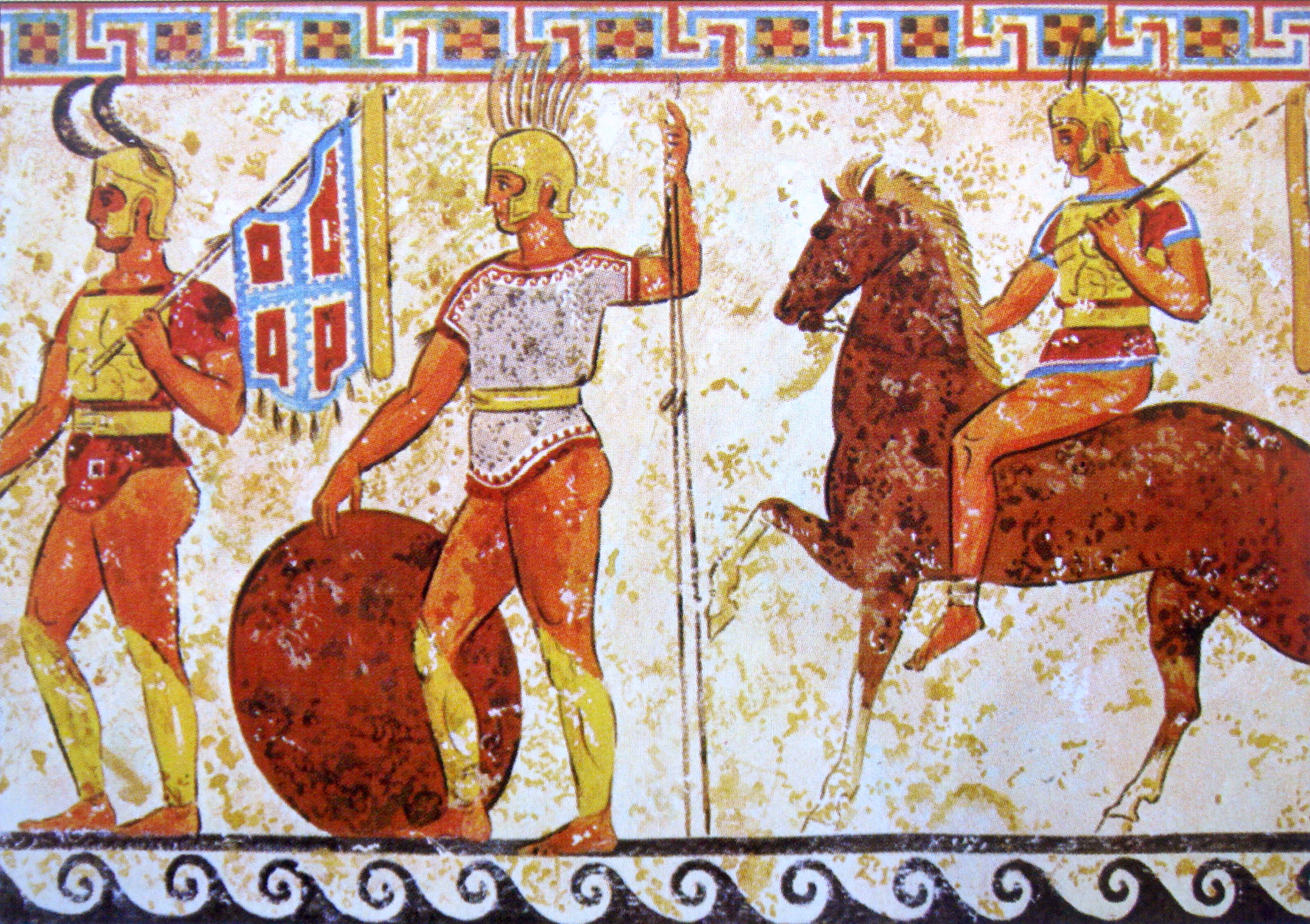
Samnite soldiers from a tomb frieze in Nola 4th century BC.

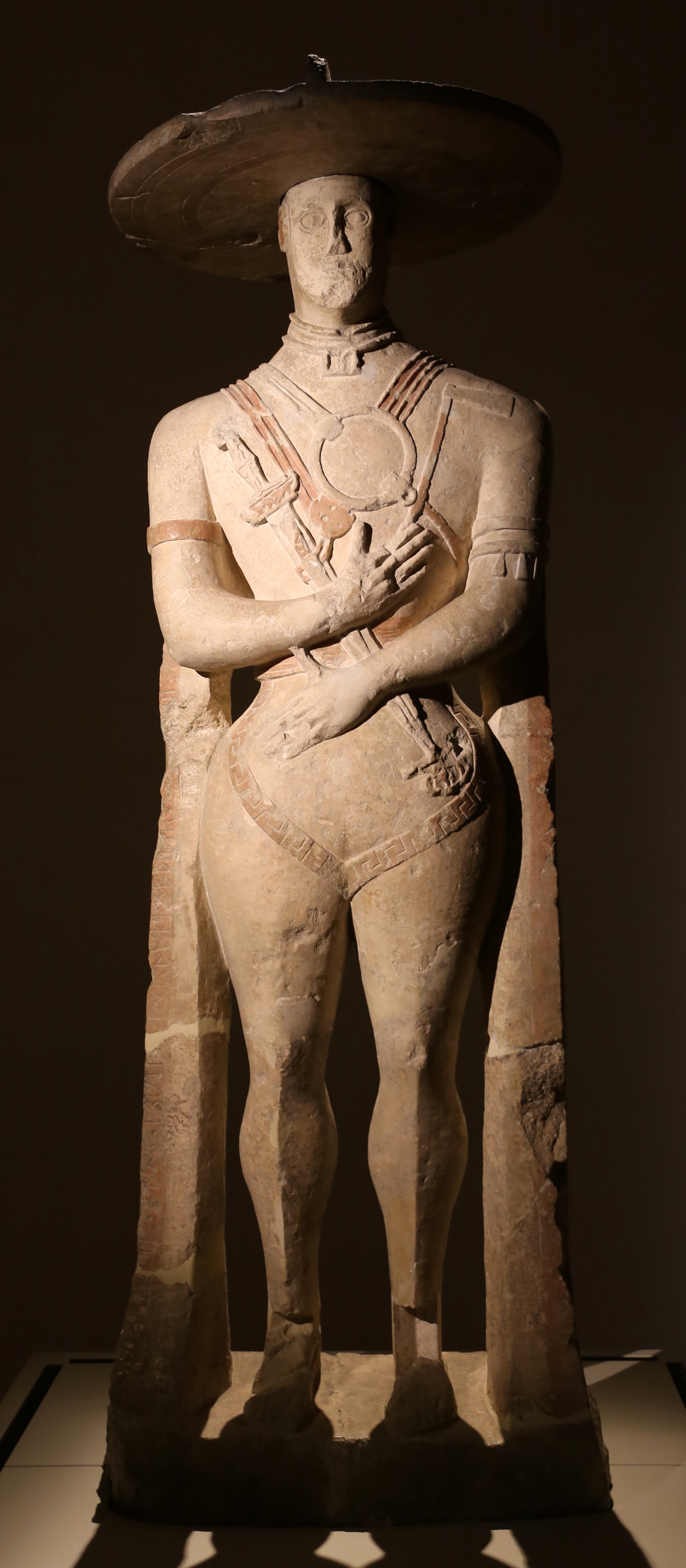
The Warrior of Capestrano, a South Picene statue

- Oscans - Centered in the part of Italy towards Tyrrhenia".
  - Opici
    - Aurunci/Ausones
    - Sidicini
    - Campanians - Centered in the region of Naples
    - Mamertines
    - Paeligni
  - Frentani - Centered on the southern Adriatic coast.
  - Samnites - Centered in central Italy, south-east of Rome north-east of Capua.
    - Pentri
    - Caraceni
    - Caudini
    - Hirpini
  - Lucani - Centered on the south-western coast of Italy.
    - Bruttii
- Oenotri
  - Itali
  - Morgetes
- Others
  - Aequi
  - Hernici
  - Vestini
  - Euganei

==== Celts ====
The Celts of the Italian peninsula included,

- Cisalpine Gauls - Centered in the area south of Lepontii.
  - Boii
  - Carni
  - Cenomani
  - Lingones
  - Senones
  - Vertamocorii
  - Gaesatae?
  - Insubres
  - Arverni
  - Aedui
  - Ambarri
  - Aulerci
  - Bituriges
  - Carnutes

Map of Cisalpine Gaul showing in blue the approximate distributions of Celtic populations in the area during the 4th and 3rd centuries BC.

- Lepontics
  - Graioceli
  - Lepontii
  - Salassi
  - Medulli
  - Ceutrones
  - Allobroges
  - Veragri
  - Helvetii
  - Seduni

==== Ligures ====
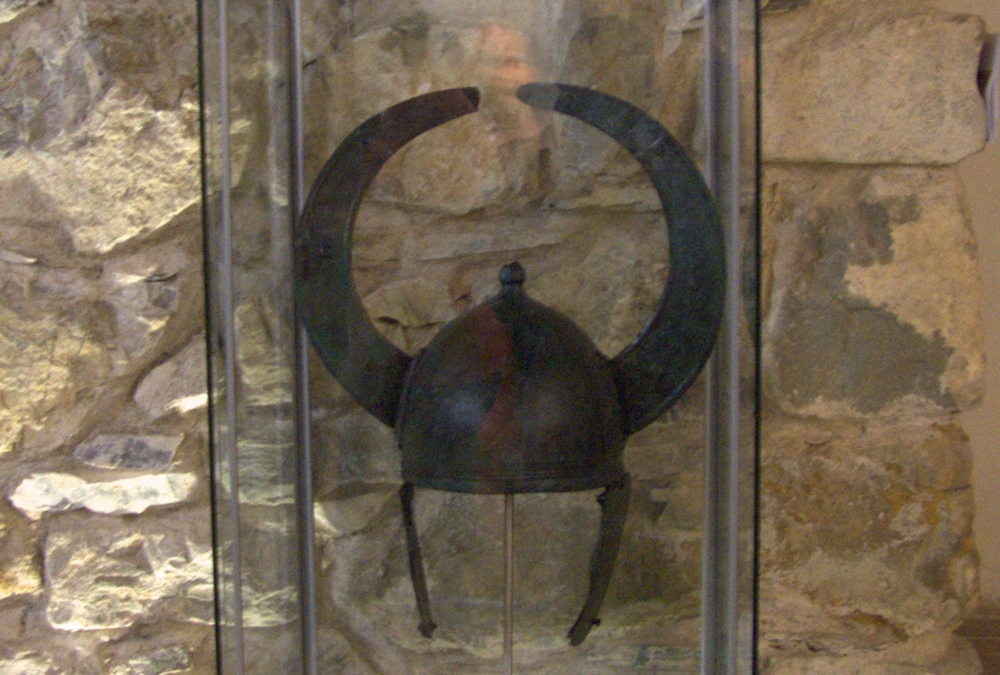
A reproduction of a Ligure helmet

The Ligures, who may have spoken Pre-Indo-European or an Indo-European language, were:

- Ligures
  - Apuani
  - Bagienni
  - Briniates
  - Friniates
  - Garuli
  - Hercates
  - Ilvates
  - Orobii
  - Laevi
  - Lapicini
  - Marici
  - Segusini
  - Statielli
  - Taurini

=== Greeks ===
Ancient Greek colonies and their dialect groupings in Southern Italy (the so-called "Magna Graecia")

Sometimes referred in ancient sources as Pelasgi, the Ancient Greeks of the Italian peninsula included,

- Achaeans
- Dorians
- Ionians
- Italiotes
- Siceliotes

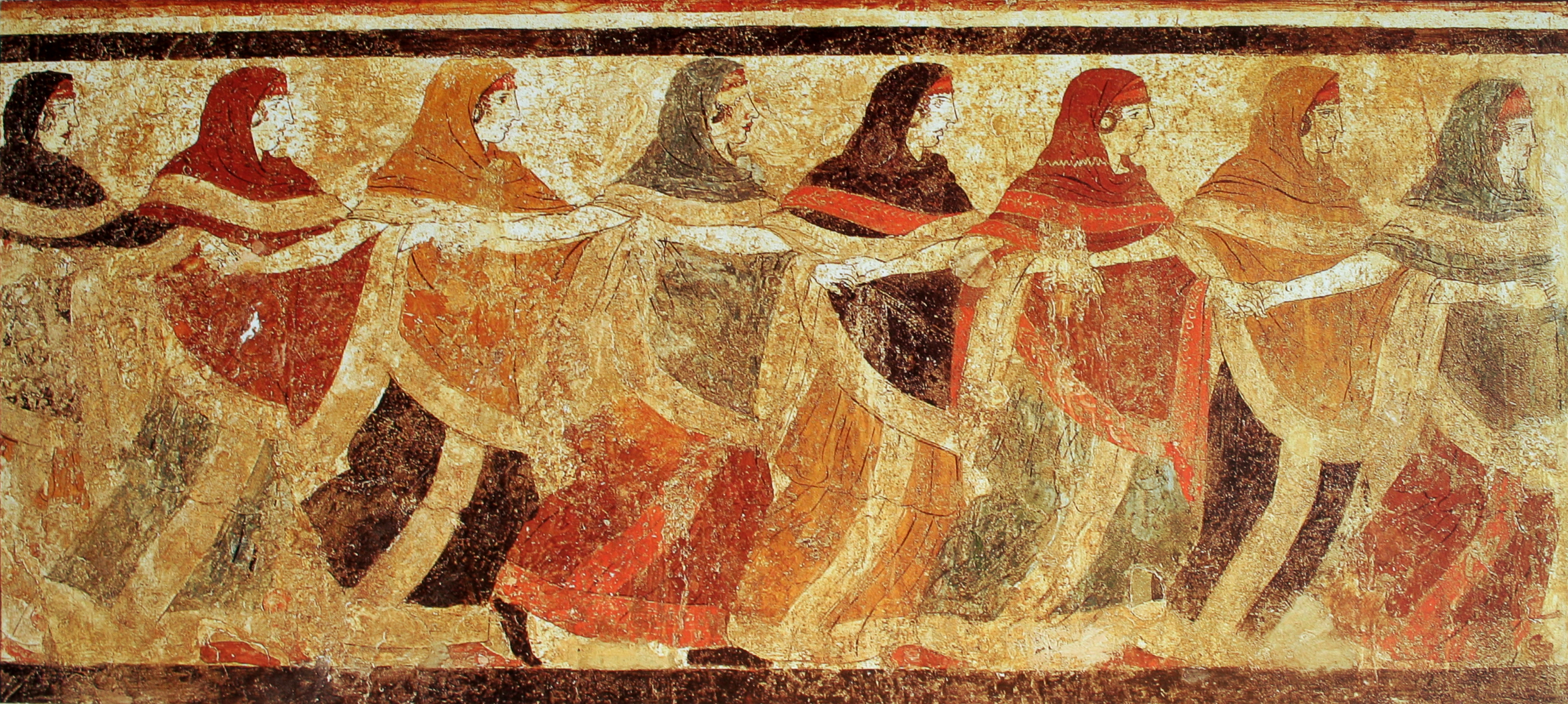
Fresco of dancing Peucetian women in the Tomb of the Dancers in Ruvo di Puglia, 4th-5th century BC

=== Others (classification uncertain) ===
- Iapygians or Apulians (possibly related to Illyrians) - Centered in an area corresponding to the modern-day region of Apulia.
  - Messapians
  - Peucetians
  - Daunians
- Elymians, who inhabited the western part of Sicily during the Bronze Age and Classical antiquity.

== Prehistoric archaeological cultures ==
The specific identities or names of the tribes or groups of peoples that practiced these pre-Roman archaeological cultures are mostly unknown. The posited existence of these archaeological cultures is based on archaeological assemblages of artifacts that share common traits and are found within a certain region and originate within a certain prehistoric period. Therefore, many of these archaeological cultures may not necessarily correspond to a specific group of ancient people and, in fact, may have been shared among various groups of ancient peoples. The extent to which an archaeological culture is representative of a particular cohesive ancient group of people is open for debate; many of these cultures may be the product of a single ancient Italian tribe or civilization (e.g. Latial culture), while others may have been spread among different groups of ancient Italian peoples and even outside of Italy. For example, Latial culture is believed to be the product specifically of the Ancient Latin tribe; the Canegrate culture and Golasecca culture have been associated with various ancient proto-Celtic, Celtic and Ligure tribes including the Lepontii, Orobii, and Insubres, while other archaeological cultures may have been present among multiple groups throughout and beyond the Italian peninsula.

Incineration and inhumation in Iron Age Italy

=== Neolithic ===
- Pre-Nuragic Sardinia
  - Cardial Culture
  - Grotta Verde culture
  - Filiestru culture
  - Bonu Ighinu culture
  - San Ciriaco culture
  - Arzachena culture
  - Ozieri culture
- Gaudo culture

=== Copper Age ===
- Pre-Nuragic Sardinia
  - Abealzu-Filigosa culture
  - Monte Claro culture
  - Sardinian Beaker culture
- Beaker culture
- Remedello culture
- Rinaldone culture
- Laterza culture
- Gaudo culture
- Conelle-Ortucchio culture
- Serraferlicchio culture
- Spilamberto group

=== Bronze Age ===
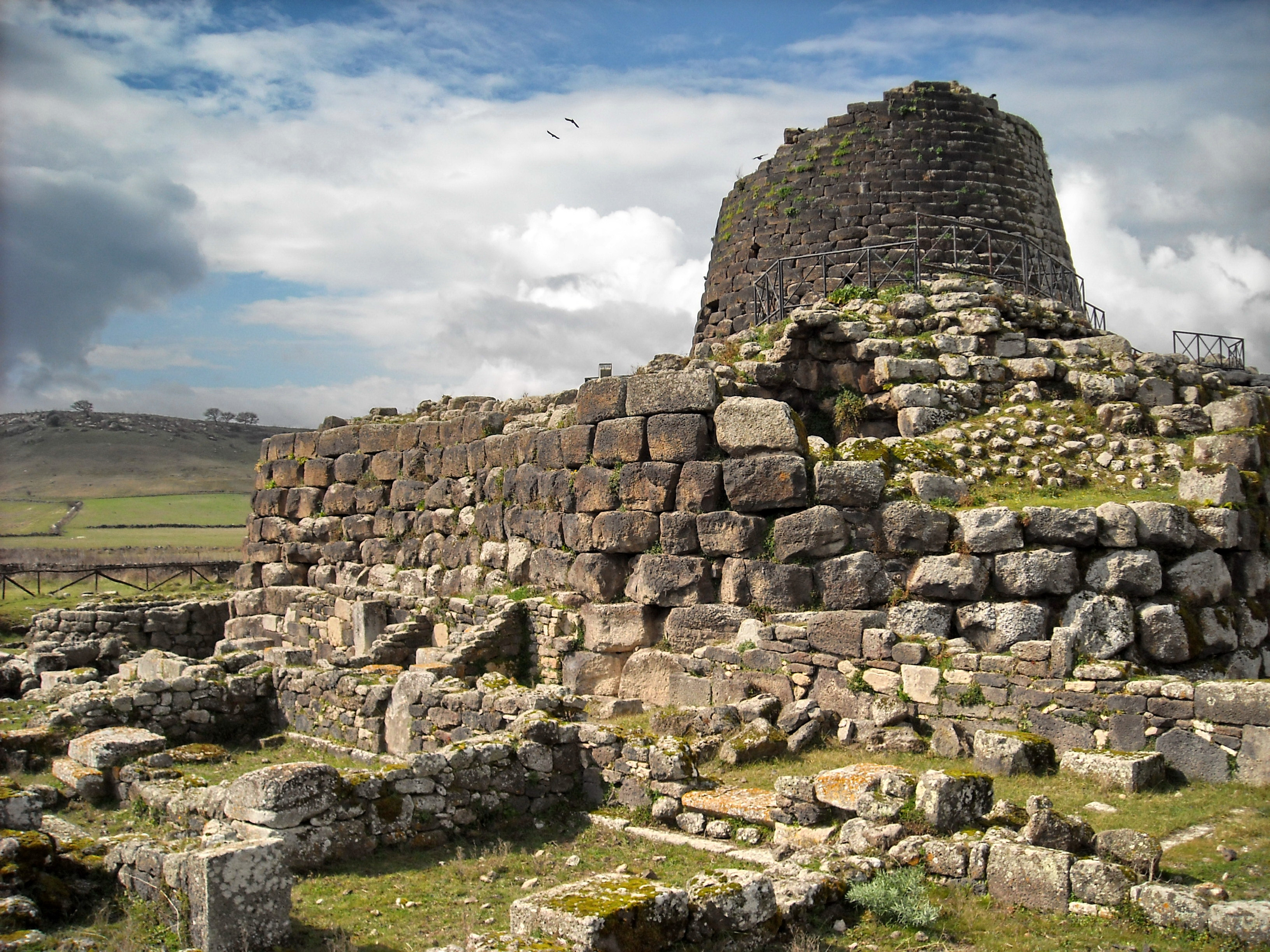
Nuraghe Santu Antine in Torralba

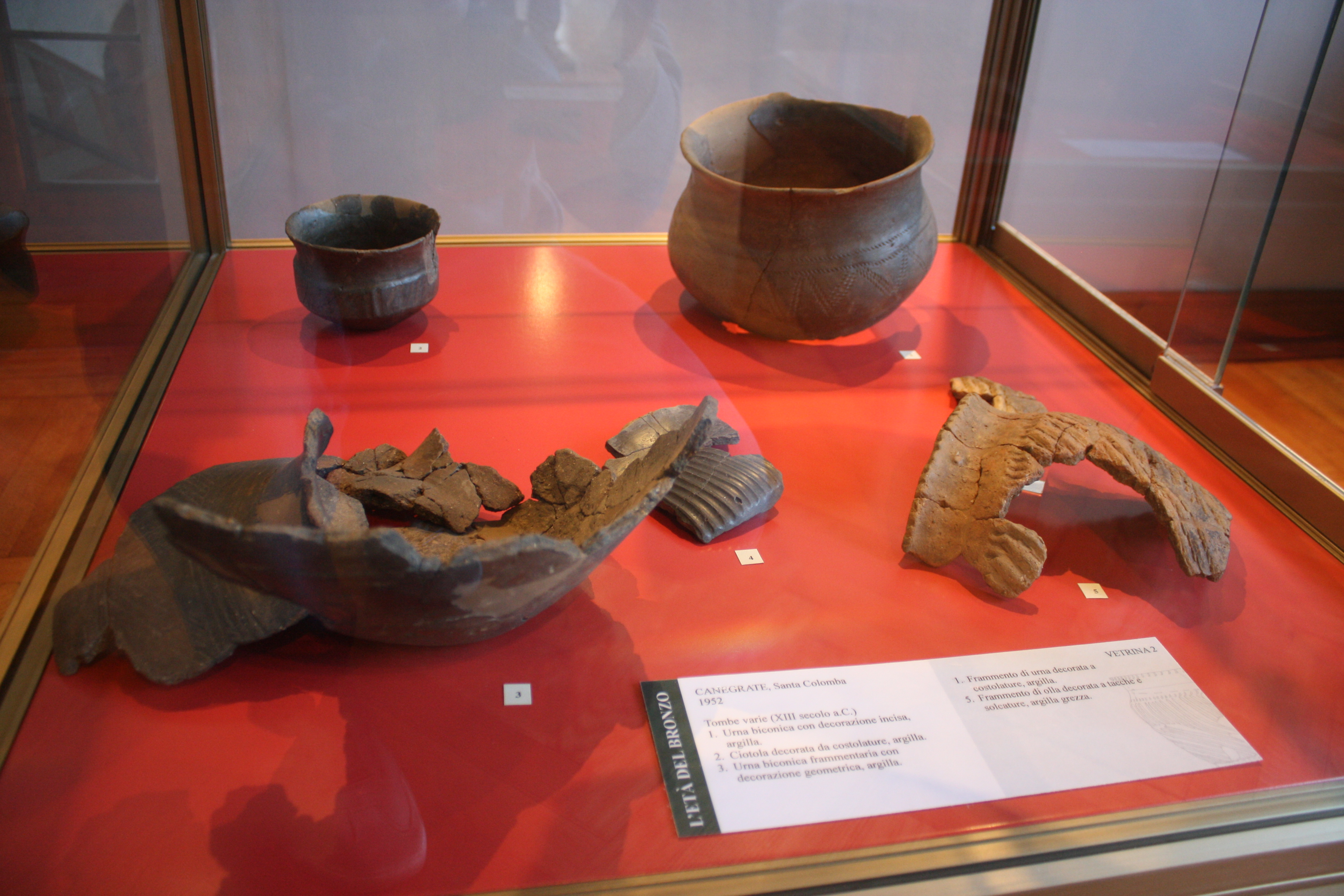
Archaeological finds of Canegrate culture

- Apennine culture
- Bonnanaro culture
- Nuragic civilization
- Torrean civilization
- Canegrate culture
- Proto-Villanovan culture
- Polada culture
- Castelluccio Culture
- Thapsos Culture
- Terramare culture
- Castellieri culture
- Luco-Meluno culture
- Scamozzina culture

=== Iron Age ===
- Hallstatt culture
- La Tène culture
- Villanova culture
- Latial culture
- Este culture
- Golasecca culture
- Camunni culture
- Fritzens-Sanzeno culture

== Genetics ==
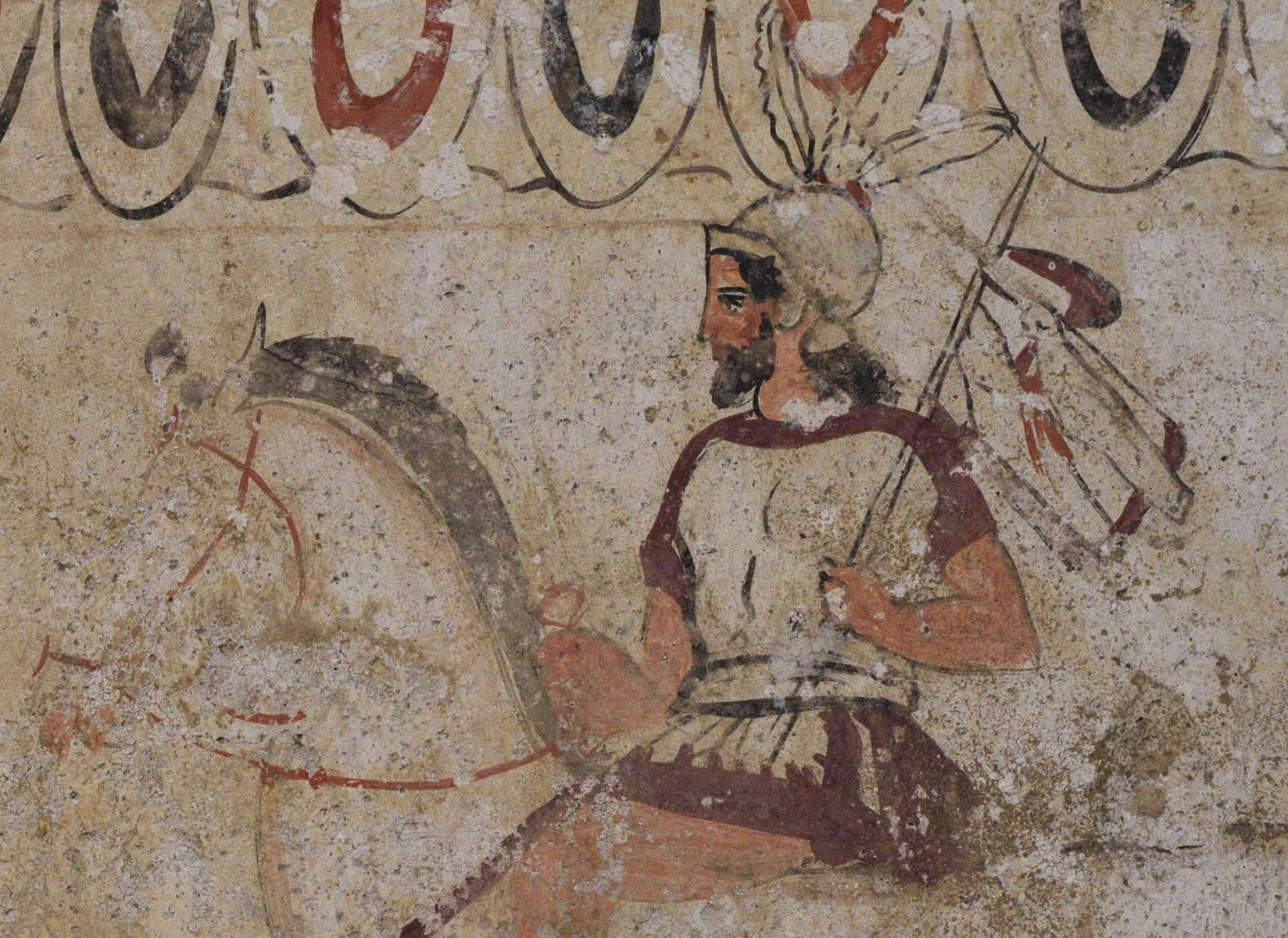
Detail of fresco from the Lucanian tomb, 4th century BC

A genetic study published in Science in November 2019 examined the remains of six Latin males buried near Rome between 900 BC and 200 BC. They carried the paternal haplogroups R-M269, T-L208, R-311, R-PF7589 and R-P312 (two samples), and the maternal haplogroups H1aj1a, T2c1f, H2a, U4a1a, H11a and H10. A female from the preceding Proto-Villanovan culture carried the maternal haplogroups U5a2b. These examined individuals were distinguished from preceding populations of Italy by the presence of ca. 25-35% steppe ancestry. Overall, the genetic differentiation between the Latins, Etruscans and the preceding proto-villanovan population of Italy was found to be insignificant.

== See also ==
- Prehistoric Italy
- Genetic history of Italy
- List of ancient Italic peoples
- List of Nuragic tribes
- History of Italy
- History of the Mediterranean region
- Prehistory of Corsica
- History of Corsica
- Prehistory of Malta
- History of Malta
- History of Sardinia
- History of Sicily
- List of Celtic tribes
- List of ancient Greek tribes
- List of ancient Iranian peoples
- Rock Drawings in Valcamonica
- Osco-Umbrian languages
- Roman Kingdom
- Founding of Rome
- Aeneid
- Old Latium
