= Campanians =

Ancient Italic tribe

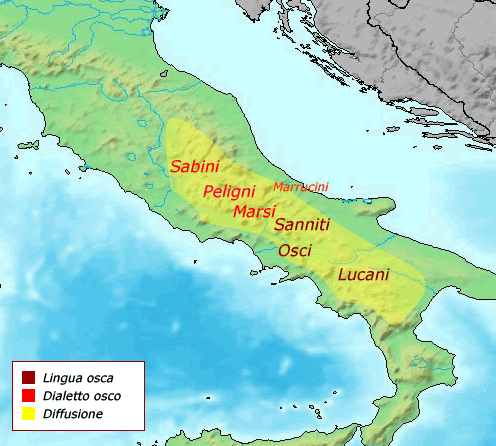
The Oscan language in the 5th century BC.

The Campanians (also Campani) were an ancient Italic tribe, part of the Osci nation, speaking an Oscan language.

Descending from the Apennines, the proto-Osci settled in the areas of present-day Campania at the beginning of the 1st millennium BC, or even before. They established themselves there over a previous Italic population of possible Latino-Faliscan origin. The Opici, Ausones and Aurunci were later linguistically and culturally Oscanized.

From the 7th to the 5th century BC, Greek colonists submitted or expelled them from the area, but starting from the mid of the 5th century BC, the Osci reconquered many cities on the coasts of present-day Province of Caserta, Naples and Low Latium as also most of the inland. Amongst those reconquered cities there were Cumae (taken from the Greeks) and Capua (from the Etruscans).

From the Greeks and the Etruscans the Osci learnt of the institution of the Polis, soon differentiating themselves from the akin people of the Samnites, so much that, in the 4th century BC the Osci invoked the help of Rome against the menace of the Samnitic expansionism.

The name Campanians, used by the Romans from the 5th century BC, apparently comes from that of Capua, the leading city of the Capuan League, one of the Oscan main polities. It was used to designate both the inhabitants of the city itself and those of the other federated cities. The surrounding territory was known as Ager Campanus.

During the Roman imperial age, consequently to the Augustan administrative reorganization of the Italian peninsula, the concept of Campania (the "Land of the Campani") was extended far beyond its original limits up to encompassing a much larger territory enclosed inside the southern part of the Regio I Latium et Campania.

== See also ==
- Campania
- Capua
- Ancient peoples of Italy
- List of ancient Italic peoples

== Bibliografia ==
- Giovanni Pugliese Carratelli, Italia, omnium terrarum alumna, Officine grafiche Garzanti Milano, Garzanti-Schewiller, 1990^{1}
