= Subocrini =

Ancient Alpine tribe

The Subocrini were an ancient tribe of the southeastern Alps, settled in the hinterland of Tergeste around the Ocra pass and Mount Ocra (Mount Nanos), in present-day western Slovenia. They may have formed a sub-group of the Carni, though their affiliation remains uncertain.

== Name ==
They are mentioned as Subocrini by Pliny the Elder (1st c. AD). The name may also occur in the honorific inscription for the senator L. Fabius Severus from Tergeste, where R. F. Rossi proposed restoring [Subocri]ni in place of the older reading [Car]ni.

The ethnonym Subocrini has been linked to the Ocra pass (Razdrto, below Mount Nanos) and to Mount Ocra. According to Jaroslav Šašel, Subocrini denotes "those (dwelling) below the Ocra", that is, below Mount Nanos and the pass at its foot.

== Territory ==
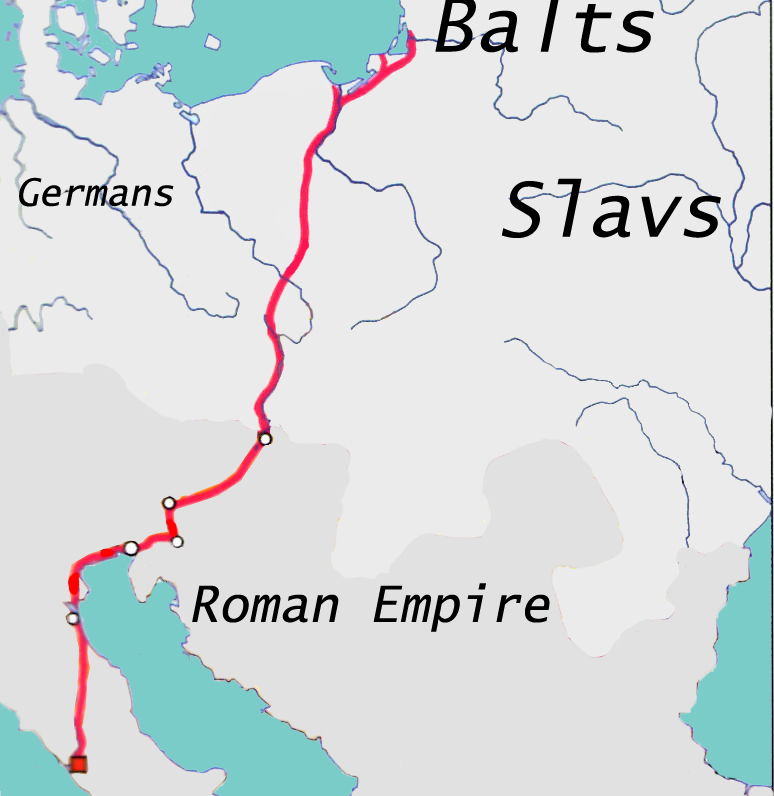
The ancient Amber Road went through the Ocra pass, in the territory of the Subocrini

They are mentioned by Pliny the Elder in a list of the Alpine peoples between Pola and the region of Tergeste: "the Fecusses, Subocrini, Catali, and Menocaleni, and, next to the Carni, those once called Taurisci and now Norici". (Note: Incolae Alpium multi populi, sed inlustres a Pola ad Tergestis regionem Fecusses, Subocrini, Catali, Menocaleni iuxtaque Carnos quondam Taurisci appellati nunc Norici (Pliny, N.h. 3.133).)

Their territory was located in the Vipava valley and the Postojna basin, in Inner Carniola, along the route across the Ocra pass that connected the lower Isonzo and Timavo region, by way of the Vipava valley and the Karst, with the Ljubljana Basin and the continental interior. The pass formed part of the Amber Road and of the caravan routes leading toward the Kvarner Gulf.

Several hillforts below Mount Nanos have been attributed to them, among them Stari grad near Hruševje and the fortified settlement at Grad near Šmihel, the latter perhaps identical with the town of Ocra mentioned by Pliny and described as already ruined in the time of Augustus.

== History ==
The ancient name Carni covered a number of peoples (gentes) of the southeastern Alps and the hinterland of the Caput Adriae, and the Subocrini are counted among them. The Ocra pass was of great strategic and commercial importance long before the Roman conquest, as the easiest crossing between the Adriatic and the interior. At Grad near Šmihel a hoard of Roman Republican weapons of the early 2nd century BC (or earlier) was found. The temporary damage to the settlement has tentatively been connected with the march of the consul C. Cassius Longinus in 171 BC, although its permanent destruction is thought unlikely. Marjeta Šašel Kos has suggested that the "Alpine peoples" (Alpini populi) plundered by Longinus on his return, as recorded by Livy, could have been the Subocrini, the Catali, or the Menocaleni.

Under Augustus the Subocrini, together with the Catali, formed a peregrine community attributed (adtributio) to the colony of Tergeste. They kept their peregrine status for some three centuries, from the establishment of Roman rule in the 2nd century BC until the mid-2nd century AD. The senator L. Fabius Severus then obtained from the emperor Antoninus Pius the grant of Latin rights (Latium maius) to the communities of the Carni (or Subocrini) and Catali, which opened to their elites access to Roman citizenship and to the town council of Tergeste. Slapšak argues that the integration of the local elites into the municipal order triggered the collapse of the social structure of these indigenous communities.
