= Latins (Italic tribe) =

Italic tribe in ancient antiquity

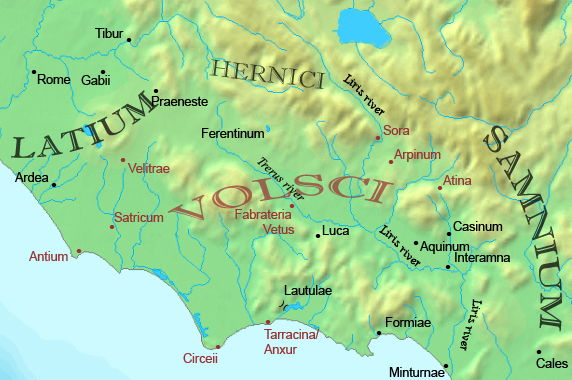
Map of fifth-century BC Latium and surrounding regions in present-day Italy that were eventually annexed by Rome to form "New Latium": The Alban Hills, a region of early Latin settlement (from around 1000 BC) and the site of the Latiar, the most important Latin communal festival, are located under the "U" in latium. The region's two main lakes, Nemi and Albanus, are visible under the "I". The leading Latin city-states of Rome, Tibur (Tivoli), Praeneste (Palestrina), Ardea and Gabii are shown.

The Latins (Latin: Latīnī), sometimes known as the Latials or Latians, were an Italic people that included the early inhabitants of the city of Rome (see Roman people). From about 1000 BC, the Latins inhabited the small region known to the Romans as Old Latium (in Latin Latium vetus), the area in the Italian Peninsula between the Tiber river and the promontory of Mount Circeo, 100 km (62 mi) southeast of Rome. Following the Roman expansion, the Latins spread into the Latium adiectum, which was inhabited by Osco-Umbrian peoples.

Their language, Latin, belongs to the Italic branch of the Indo-European languages. The Italic peoples emerged from the Urnfield and Tumulus groups, who spread across Italy during the late Bronze Age and early Iron Age. The material culture of the Latins, known as the Latial culture, was a distinctive variant of the proto-Villanovan culture, which appeared in certain areas of the Italian peninsula during the first half of the 12th century BC. Before and after their political unification under Rome in 338 BC, the Latins maintained close cultural and religious ties, which included shared festivals and sanctuaries.

The rise of Rome, which, starting around 600 BC, had become by far the most populous and powerful Latin state, led to volatile relations with the other Latin states, which numbered about fourteen in 500 BC. During the period of the Tarquin monarchy (c. 550–500 BC), Rome apparently acquired political hegemony over the other states. Following the fall of the Roman monarchy around 500 BC, there appears to have been a century of military alliance between Rome and the other Latin states to counter the threat posed to the entire Latium region of raiding by the surrounding Italic mountain tribes, especially the Volsci and the Aequi. This system gradually entered a crisis after approximately 390 BC, when Rome's aggressive expansionism led to conflicts with other Latin states, both individually and collectively. In 341–338 BC, the Latin states jointly fought the Latin War against Rome in a desperate attempt to preserve their independence. The war ended in 338 BC with a decisive Roman victory. The other Latin states were annexed to Rome or permanently subjugated to it.

== Etymology ==
The name Latium has been suggested to derive from the Latin word latus ("wide, broad"), referring, by extension, to the plains of the region (in contrast to the mainly-mountainous Italian Peninsula). If that is true, Latini originally meant "men of the plain".

== Origins ==
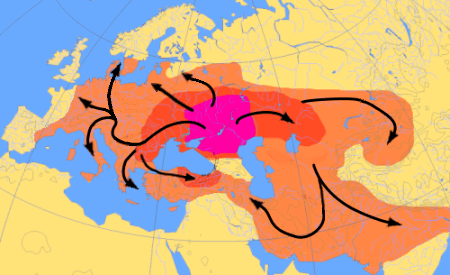
The mainstream scenario for the migration of the Indo-European (IE) peoples in the period 4000–1000 BC: Known as the Kurgan hypothesis, the scenario envisages the IE peoples migrating outwards from an original homeland in the steppe of southern Russia, north of the Caucasus Mountains (purple zone). The red zone indicates the possible extent of IE expansion by circa 2500 BC, the orange zone by around 1000 BC. Note the movement of the Italic branch from the secondary zone (around Moravia) into the Italian peninsula

The Latins belonged to a group of Indo-European-speaking (IE) tribes, conventionally known as the Italic tribes, that populated central and southern Italy during the Italian Iron Age, which began around 900 BC. The most widely accepted theory suggests that Latins and other proto-Italic tribes first entered Italy in the late Bronze Age proto-Villanovan culture, then part of the central European Urnfield culture system. In particular various authors, such as Marija Gimbutas, had noted important similarities between the proto-Villanovan culture, the South-German Urnfield culture of Bavaria-Upper Austria and Middle-Danube Urnfield culture. According to David W. Anthony proto-Latins originated in today's eastern Hungary, kurganized around 3100 BC by the Yamna culture, while Kristian Kristiansen associated the proto-Villanovans with the Velatice-Baierdorf culture of Moravia and Austria. This is further confirmed by the fact that the subsequent Latial culture, Este culture and Villanovan culture, which introduced iron-working to the Italian Peninsula, were so closely related to the Central European Urnfield culture (c. 1300–750 BC), and Hallstatt culture (which succeeded the Urnfield culture), that it is not possible to tell them apart in their earlier stages. Furthermore, the contemporary Canegrate culture of Northern Italy represented a typical western example of the western Hallstatt culture, whose diffusion most probably took place in a Celtic-speaking context.

Similarly, several authors have suggested that the Beaker culture of Central and Western Europe was a candidate for an early Indo-European culture, and more specifically, for an ancestral European branch of Indo-European dialects, termed "North-west Indo-European", ancestral to Celtic, Italic, Germanic and Balto-Slavic branches. All these groups were descended from Proto-Indo-European speakers from Yamna-culture, whose migrations in Central Europe probably split off Pre-Italic, Pre-Celtic and Pre-Germanic from Proto-Indo-European.

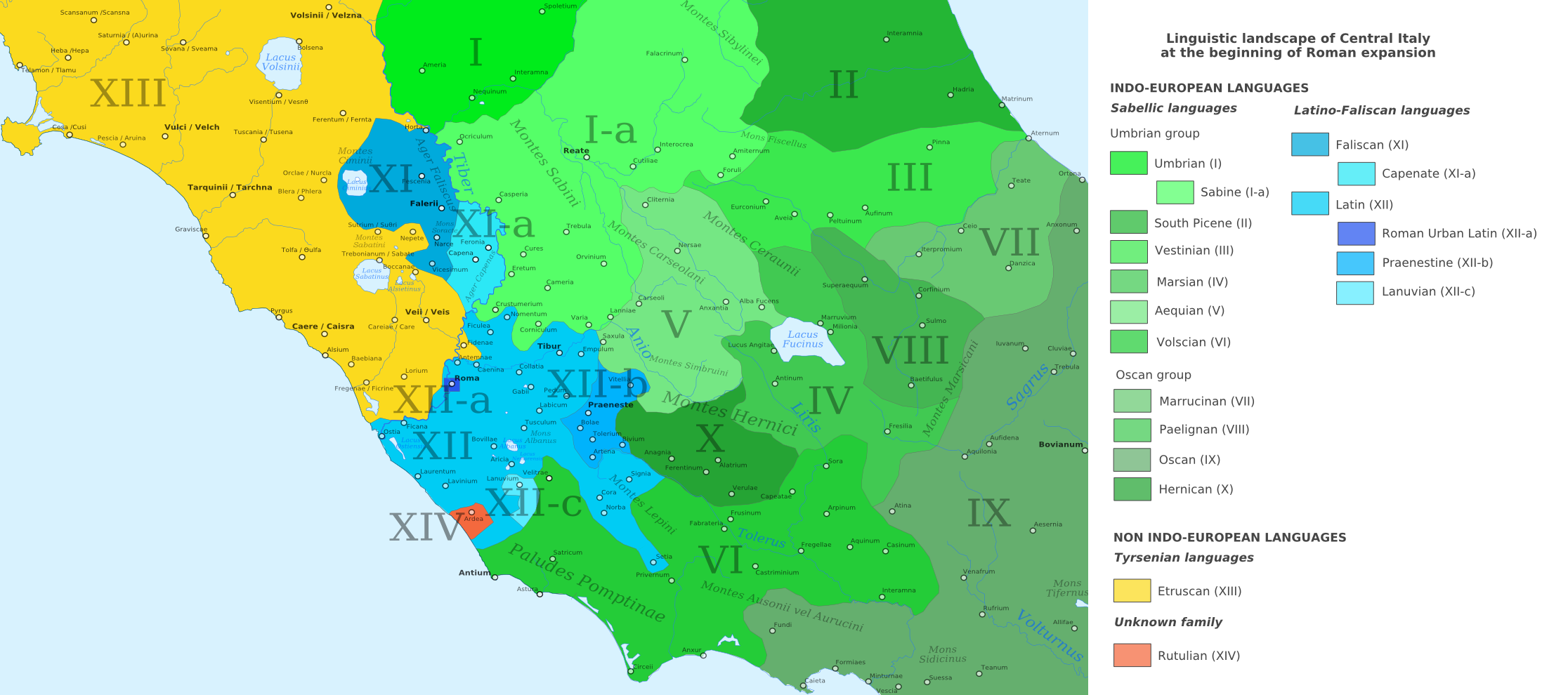
The linguistic landscape of Central Italy at the beginning of Roman expansion

Leaving archaeology aside, the geographical distribution of the ancient languages of the peninsula may plausibly be explained by the immigration of successive waves of peoples with different languages, according to Cornell. On this model, it appears likely that the "West Italic" group (including the Latins) were the first wave, followed, and largely displaced by, the East Italic (Osco-Umbrian) group. This is deduced from the marginal locations of the surviving West Italic niches. Besides Latin, putative members of the West Italic group are Faliscan (now regarded as merely a Latin dialect), and perhaps Siculian, spoken in eastern Sicily. The West Italic languages were thus spoken in limited and isolated areas, whereas the "East Italic" group comprised the Oscan and Umbrian dialects spoken over much of central and southern Italy. The chronology of Indo-European immigration remains elusive, as does the relative chronology between the Italic IE languages and the non-IE languages of the peninsula, notably the Etruscan, which is considered related to the Raetic spoken in the Alps. Other examples of non-IE languages in Iron Age Italy are the Camunic language, spoken in the Alps, and the unattested ancient Ligurian and Paleo-Sardinian languages. Most scholars consider that Etruscan is a pre-IE survival, a Paleo-European language part of an older European linguistic substratum, spoken long before the arrival of proto Indo-European speakers. Some scholars have earlier speculated that Etruscan language could have been introduced by later migrants. The ancient Greek historian Herodotus preserves the tradition that the Tyrrhenoi (Etruscans) originated in Lydia in Anatolia, but Lydians spoke an Indo-European language, completely different from the Etruscan language. Despite this, a possible support for an eastern origin for Etruscan may be provided by two inscriptions in a language closely related to Etruscan found on the island of Lemnos in the northern Aegean Sea (see Lemnian language), even though some scholars believe that the Lemnian language might have arrived in the Aegean Sea during the Late Bronze Age, when Mycenaean rulers recruited groups of mercenaries from Sicily, Sardinia and various parts of the Italian peninsula. Other scholars, however, argue that the presence of a language similar to Etruscan in Lemnos was due to Etruscan commercial adventurers arriving from the west shortly before 700 BC. The archaeological evidence available from Iron Age Etruria shows no sign of any invasion, migration, or arrival of small immigrant-elites from the Eastern Mediterranean who may have imposed their language. Between the end of the Bronze Age and the beginning of the Iron Age, Etruria shows above all contacts with Central Europe and the Urnfield culture, as there is great consensus that the subsequent orientalizing period was an artistic-cultural phenomenon not exclusively Etruscan, also spread to other areas of Italy and the Greek world, and that can be better explained by trade and exchange rather than by migrations. Genetic studies on samples of Etruscan individuals, both on mitochondrial and autosomal DNA, are also against an eastern origin of the Etruscans and have supported a deep, local origin. A 2019 Stanford genetic study, which has analyzed the autosomal DNA of Iron Age samples from the areas around Rome, has concluded that Etruscans were similar to the Latins from Latium vetus. According to British archeologist Phil Perkins, "there are indications that the evidence of DNA can support the theory that Etruscan people are autochthonous in central Italy".

== Language ==
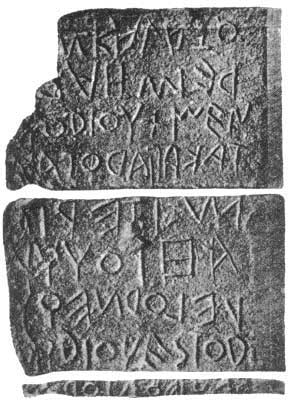
The Lapis Niger, probably the oldest extant Latin inscription (c. 600 BC)

The tribe spoke the Latin language (specifically Old Latin), a member of the western branch of the Italic languages, in turn a branch of the Indo-European (IE) family of languages in Europe

The oldest extant inscription in the Latin language is believed to be engraved on the Lapis Niger ("Black Stone") discovered in 1899 in the Roman Forum, dating from around 600 BC: in the mid-Roman Kingdom era, according to the traditional Roman chronology, but more likely close to its inception. Written in a primitive form of Archaic Latin, it indicates that the Romans remained Latin-speakers in the period when some historians have suggested that Rome had become "Etruscanised" in both language and culture. It also lends support to the existence of the Kings of Rome in this era, whom some historians regarded as mythical: the inscription contains the word recei, the word for "king" in the dative singular in archaic Latin - regi in classical Latin, or to the rex sacrorum, rather than the political king of Rome.

== Material culture ==
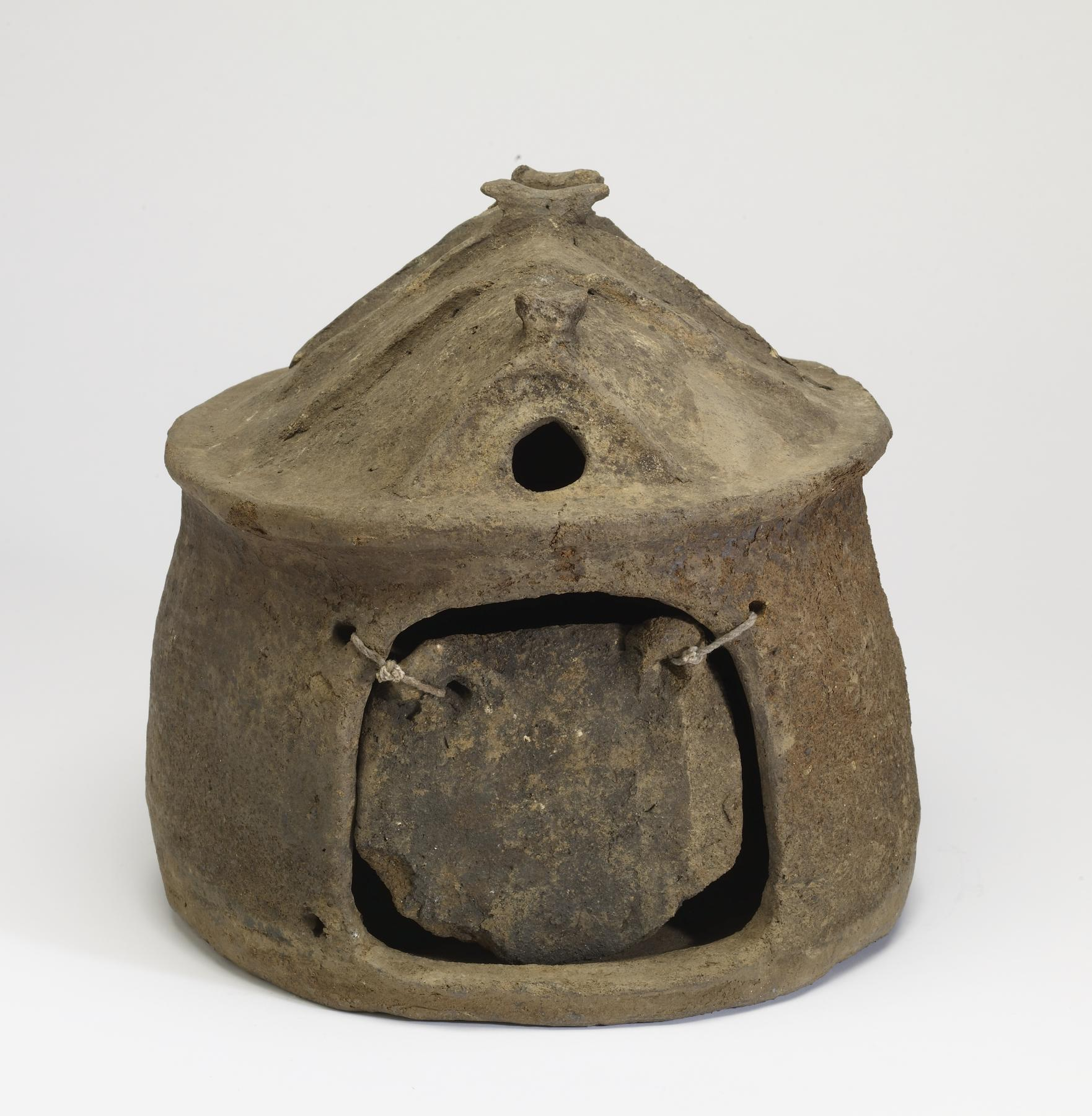
Villanovan culture cinerary hut-urn, showing the likely shape of Romulus' Hut in Rome: a simple mud-and-straw shelter

There is no archaeological evidence at present that Old Latium hosted permanent settlements during the Bronze Age. Some very small amounts of Apennine culture pottery shards have been found in Latium, most likely belonging to transient pastoralists engaged in transhumance. It thus appears that the Latins occupied Latium Vetus not earlier than around 1000 BC. Initially, the Latin immigrants into Latium were probably concentrated in the low hills that extend from the central Apennine range into the coastal plain (much of which was then marshy and malarial, and thus uninhabitable). A notable area of early settlement were the Alban Hills, a plateau about 20 km (13 mi) SE of Rome containing a number of extinct volcanoes and 5 lakes, of which the largest are lacus Nemorensis (Lake Nemi) and lacus Tusculensis (Lake Albano). These hills provided a defensible, well-watered base. Also the hills on the site of Rome, certainly the Palatine and possibly the Capitoline and the Quirinal, hosted permanent settlements at a very early stage.

The Latins appear to have become culturally differentiated from the surrounding Osco-Umbrian Italic tribes from c. 1000 BC onwards. From this time, the Latins exhibit the features of the Iron Age Latial culture found in Etruria and the Po valley. In contrast, the Osco-Umbrian tribes do not exhibit the same features of the Latins, who thus shared the broadly same material culture as the Etruscans. The variant of Villanovan found in Latium is dubbed the Latial culture. The most distinctive feature of Latial culture were cinerary urns in the shape of miniature tuguria ("huts"). In Phase I of the Latium culture (c. 1000–900 BC) these hut-urns only appear in some burials, but they become standard in Phase II cremation burials (900–770 BC). They represent the typical single-roomed hovels of contemporary peasants, which were made from simple, readily available materials: wattle-and-daub walls and straw roofs supported by wooden posts. The huts remained the main form of Latin housing until about 650 BC. The most famous exemplar was the Casa Romuli ("Hut of Romulus") on the southern slope of the Palatine Hill, supposedly built by the legendary founder of Rome with his own hands and which reportedly survived until the time of emperor Augustus (ruled 30 BC - AD 14).

Around 650 BC began a period of urbanisation, with the establishment of political city-states in Latium. The most notable example is Rome itself, which was originally a group of separate settlements on the various hills. It appears that they coalesced into a single entity around 625 BC, when the first buildings were established on the site of the later Roman Forum.

== Social culture ==
=== Relics of Indo-European culture ===
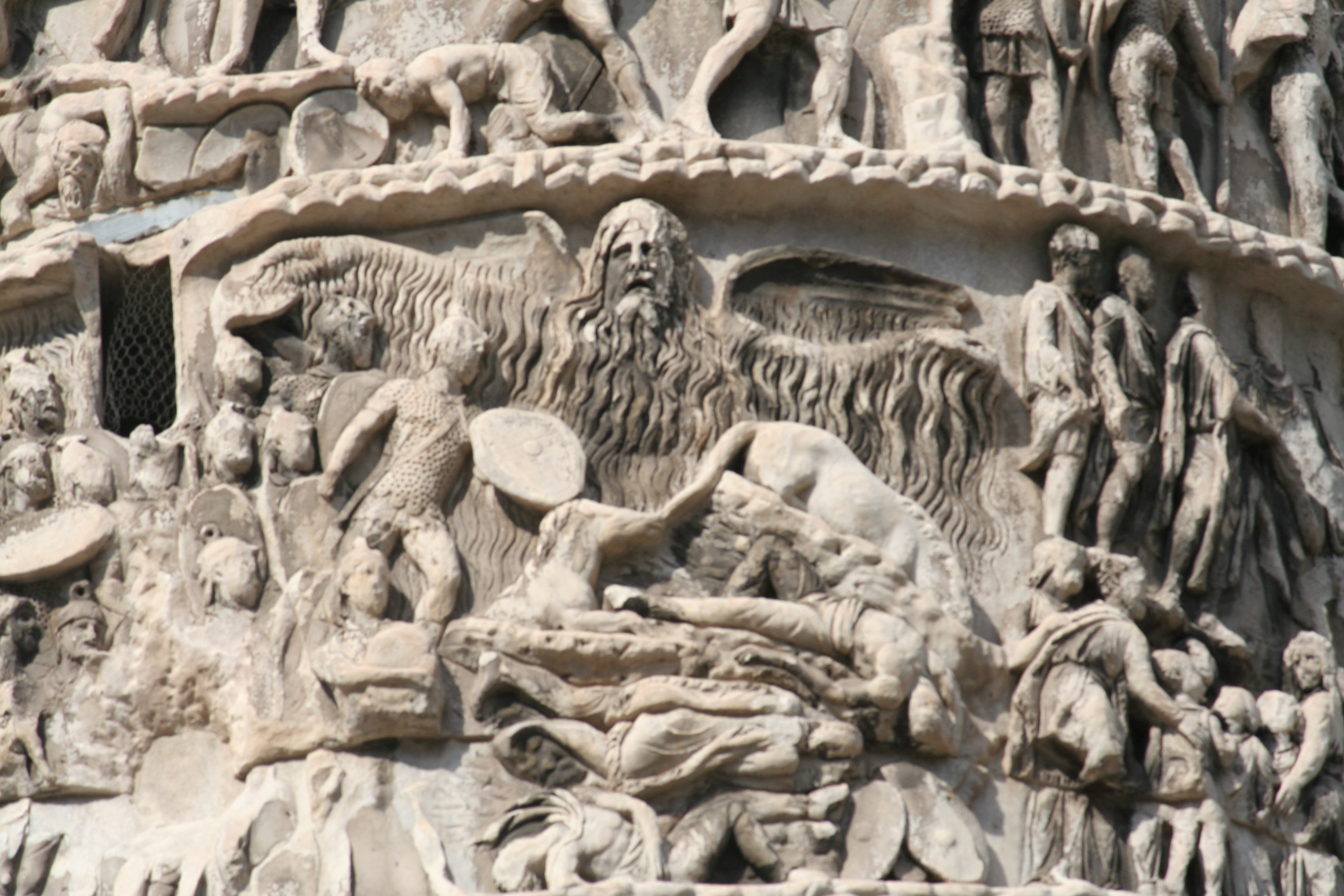
The "Rain Miracle": Jupiter the Rainmaker rescues the Romans during the Marcomannic Wars (AD 166–180). The soldiers of legion XII Fulminata, who were surrounded by the Quadi Germans and severely dehydrated, were saved by a thunderstorm, which reportedly materialised out of a clear sky. Note the god's wings. Detail from the Column of Marcus Aurelius, Rome

According to the mainstream Kurgan hypothesis, the earliest Indo-European speakers were a nomadic steppe people, originating in the Eurasian steppes (southern Russia, northern Caucasus and central Asia). Their livelihood was based on horses and herding. In the historical era, the same socio-cultural lifestyle was maintained, in the same regions, by peoples descended from the Proto-Indo-Europeans (PIEs) known to the Greco-Romans as Scythians, Sarmatians and Alans, whose languages belonged to the Iranian branch of IE. On the basis of common steppe-nomadic features in the cultures of the various Indo-European peoples in the historical era, scholars have reconstructed elements of proto-Indo-European culture. Relics of such elements have been discerned in Roman and Latin customs. Examples include:

1. The kinship-system of PIEs is considered by anthropologists to best fit the so-called "Omaha" system, i.e. a patrilineal exogamous society, i.e. a society in which descent is recognised through the father's line and spouses are taken from outside the kinship-group. This is certainly the case with Roman society.
2. Supreme sky-god: It has been securely reconstructed that the chief god of PIEs was a male sky-god, known as "Father Sky", from which descends the chief Latin god, Jupiter, deriving from archaic "Dieus - pater" ("sky-father"). PIEs also venerated a god of thunder and lightning. Among the Latins, this deity appears to have been merged with the sky-god, as Jupiter was ascribed the power to hurl thunderbolts. Among others, Jupiter was ascribed the epithets Jupiter Tonitrans ("Jupiter the Thunderer"), Jupiter Pluvius ("Jupiter the Rainmaker"), and Jupiter Fulgurator ("Jupiter the Thunderbolt-Flinger")
3. Fire-worship: A central feature of PIE life was the domestic hearth. It is thus considered certain that PIEs worshipped fire. The best-known derivative is the fire-worship of the ancient Iranian religion (see Zoroastrianism). The Romans kept a perpetual sacred fire burning in the Temple of Vesta, who was the goddess of the hearth. To symbolise the hearth, it is the only Roman temple which was round, instead of square.
4. Horse-sacrifice: Originally a nomadic steppe-people, the life of PIEs was centred on horses. The sacrifice of horses was probably practised to consecrate kings. The Indic asvamedha ritual involves the sacrifice of a stallion and the ritual copulation with its corpse by the queen, followed by the distribution of the horse's parts. The Romans practised a ritual known as the October Equus, whereby the right-hand horse of a victorious team in a chariot-race was sacrificed to Mars, the god of war. Its head was severed and fought over by two teams of people, and its tail hung from the Regia (the old royal palace in Rome).
5. Swastika symbol: This symbol, the hooked cross (crux uncinata in Latin), was widely used by IE-speaking peoples in both Europe and Asia (especially in India: the term swastika is Sanskrit). According to one theory^{which?}, it was invented, and used as an ethnic emblem, by the Proto-Indo-Europeans, although it is also a documented symbol of the Stone Age Vinča culture of SE Europe (c. 5500 – 4500 BC), which was probably pre-Indo-European (although it may have been used as a hieroglyph, rather than a cultural symbol, by the Vinca people). Whatever its origin, it was widely adopted by the Indo-Europeans, among whom it probably symbolised the Sun (which was seen as a wheel rolling across the sky) and/or the Sky and was thus closely associated with their male supreme Sky-god. Among the Romans, it was not traditionally associated with the sky god Jupiter. It became associated with the sky god in Celtic southwest Gaul, where numerous dedications to Jupiter have been discovered adorned with swastikas. In the later empire (4th century onwards), when pagan symbolism lost favour due to the advance of Christianity, it came to represent the Universe, or eternal life.

=== Latin communal tribal cults ===
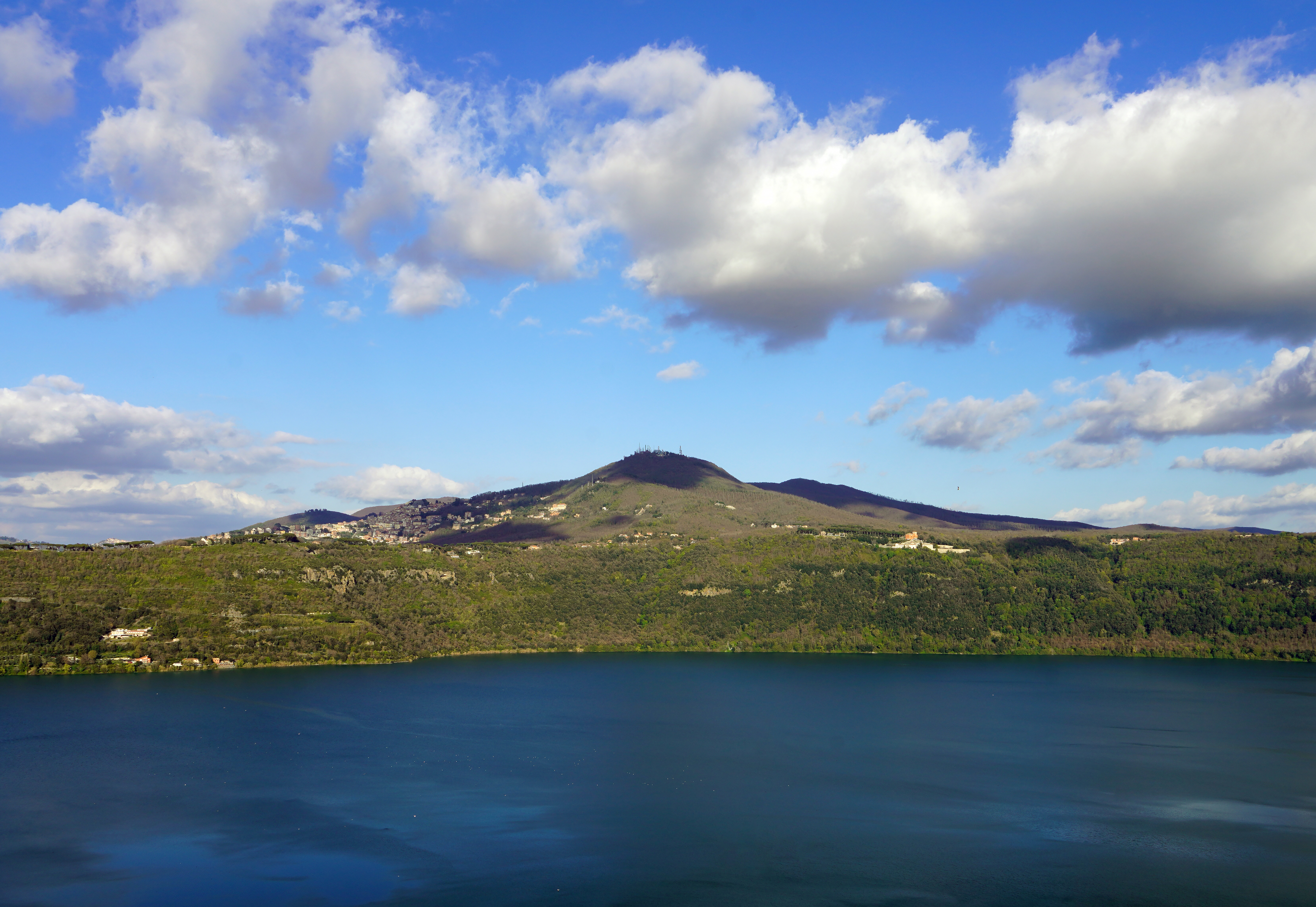
View of Albanus mons (Monte Cavo, 949m), the sacred mount of the Latins in the Alban Hills. The annual religious rites of the Latin Festival were held on its summit. In foreground, the Alban lake, filling the caldera of an extinct volcano

Despite their frequent internecine wars, the Latin city-states maintained close culturo-religious relations throughout their history. Their most important common tribal event was the four-day Latiar or Feriae Latinae ("Latin Festival"), held each winter on the sacred mons Albanus (Monte Cavo, Alban Hills, SE of Rome), an extinct volcano. The climax of the festival was a number of sacrifices to Jupiter Latiaris ("Jupiter of Latium"); the sacrificed meat was shared by the representatives of the Latin communities. These elaborate rituals, as did all Roman religious ceremonies, had to be performed with absolute precision and, if any procedural mistakes were made, had to be repeated from the start. The Latin Festival continued to be held long after all Latium Vetus was integrated into the Roman Republic after 338 BC (from then on, the Roman consuls presided over them) and into the Roman imperial era. The historian Livy, writing around AD 20, ascribed Rome's disastrous defeat by the Carthaginian general Hannibal at the Battle of Lake Trasimene in 217 BC to the impiety of the consul Gaius Flaminius, who, in his eagerness to join his army at its assembly-point of Arretium, failed to attend the Latin Festival.

Latin cultural-religious events were also held at other common cult-centres e.g. the major common shrine to Diana at Aricia. This may be the sacred grove to Diana which a fragment of Cato's Origines recorded dedicated, probably c. 500 BC, by various Latin communities under the leadership of the dictator of Tusculum, Egerius Baebius. Cornell argues that the temple of Diana reportedly founded by the Roman king Servius Tullius on the Aventine Hill at Rome was also a common Latin shrine, as it was built outside the pomerium or City boundary. There was also an important Latin cult-centre at Lavinium. Lavinium hosted the cult of the Penates, or Latin ancestor-gods. Cornell suggests that the "Sanctuary of the 13 altars" discovered in the 1960s at Lavinium was the site of the Penates cult. Since each of the altars differ in style and date, it has been suggested that each was erected by a separate Latin city-state.

== Latins in the Roman origin myth ==
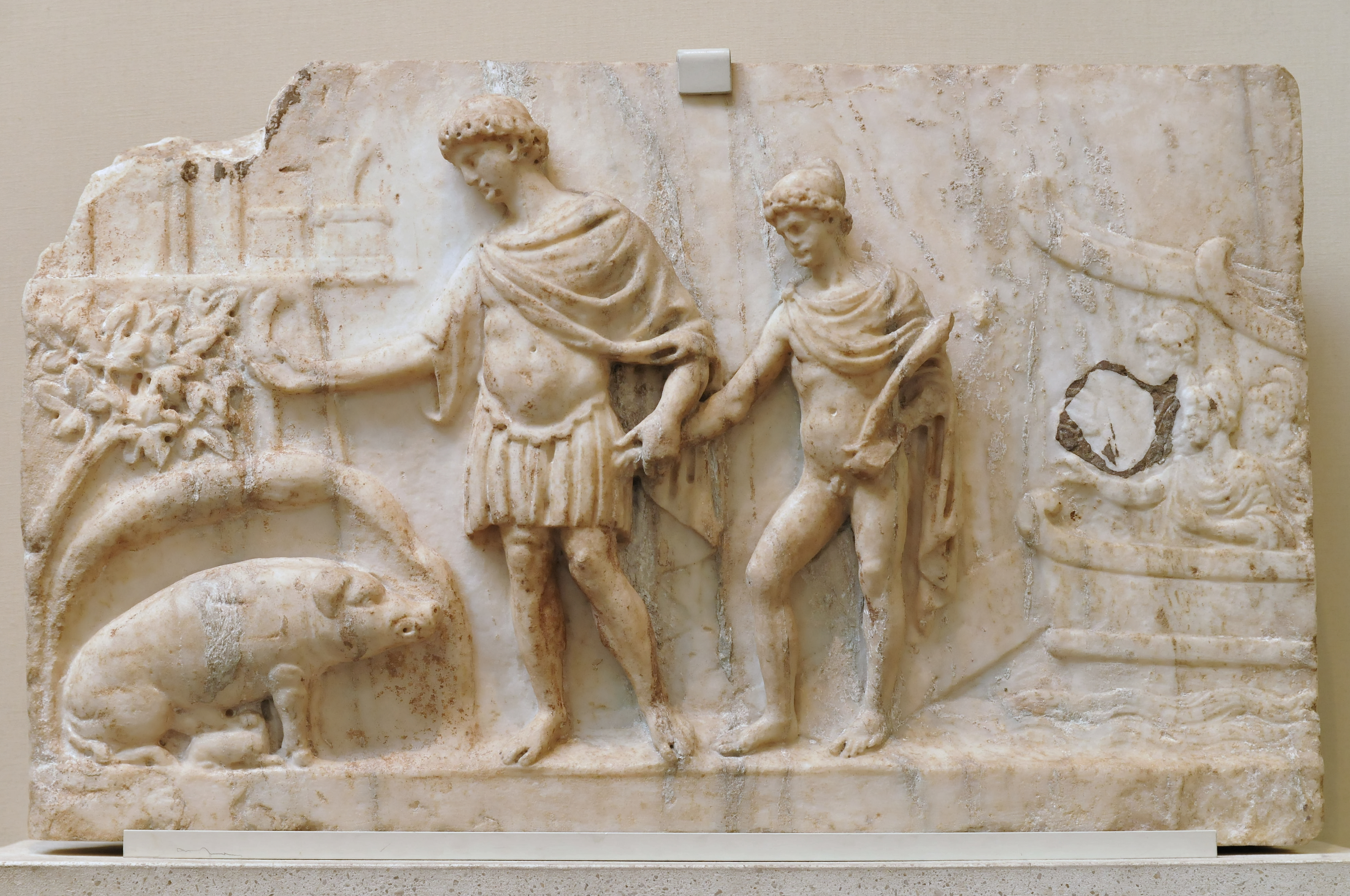
The Trojan hero Aeneas' legendary landing on the shores of Latium (note prow of his beached ship, right). Aeneas is holding his son, Ascanius, by the hand. A sow (left) shows him where to found his city (Lavinium). Roman marble bas-relief, c. AD 140–50. British Museum, London

=== Aeneas ===
Under the ever-growing influence of the Italiote Greeks, the Romans acquired their own national origin myth sometime during the early Republican era (500–300 BC). It was centred on the figure of Aeneas, a supposed Trojan survivor of the destruction of Troy by the Achaean Greeks, as related in the poet Homer's epic the Iliad (composed c. 800 BC). The legend provided the Romans with a heroic "Homeric" pedigree, as well as a (spurious) ethnic distinctiveness from the other Latins. It also provided a rationale (as poetic revenge for the destruction of Troy) for Rome's hostilities against, and eventual subjugation of, the Greek cities of southern Italy, especially Taras (mod. Taranto) in the period ending 275 BC.

The figure of Aeneas as portrayed in the Iliad lent itself to his adoption as the Roman "Abraham": a mighty warrior of (minor) royal blood who personally slew 28 Achaeans in the war, he was twice saved from certain death by the gods, implying that he had a great destiny to fulfil. A passage in Homer's Iliad contains the prophecy that Aeneas and his descendants would one day rule the Trojans. Since the Trojans had been expelled from their own city, it was speculated that Aeneas and other Trojan survivors must have migrated elsewhere.

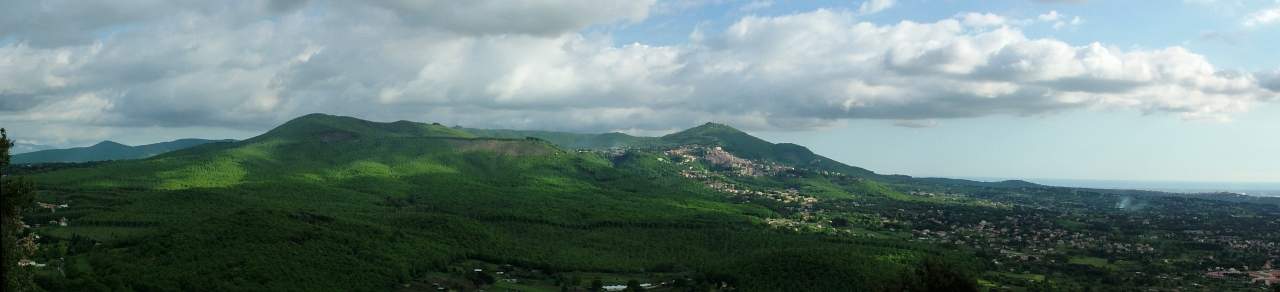
View of the Alban Hills, a volcanic plateau 20km SE of Rome. The region saw early Latin settlement and was the site of the legendary city of Alba Longa, supposedly the capital of Latium for 400 years before the foundation of Rome

The legend is given its most vivid and detailed treatment in the Roman poet Virgil's epic, the Aeneid (published around AD 20). According to this, the Latin tribe's first king was Latinus, who gave his name to the tribe and founded the first capital of the Latins, Laurentum, whose exact location is uncertain. The Trojan hero Aeneas and his men fled by sea after the capture and sack of their city, Troy, by the Greeks in 1184 BC, according to one ancient calculation. After many adventures, Aeneas and his Trojan army landed on the coast of Latium near the mouth of the Tiber. Initially, King Latinus attempted to drive them out, but he was defeated in battle. Later, he accepted Aeneas as an ally and eventually allowed him to marry his daughter, Lavinia. Aeneas supposedly founded the city of Lavinium (Pratica di Mare, Pomezia), named after his wife, on the coast not far from Laurentum. It became the Latin capital after Latinus' death. Aeneas' son (by his previous Trojan wife, a daughter of king Priam of Troy), Ascanius, founded a new city, Alba Longa in the Alban Hills, which replaced Lavinium as capital city. Alba Longa supposedly remained the Latin capital for some 400 years under Aeneas' successors, the Latin kings of Alba, until his descendant (supposedly in direct line after 15 generations) Romulus founded Rome in 753 BC. Under a later king Tullus Hostilius (traditional reign-dates 673–642 BC), the Romans razed Alba Longa to the ground and resettled its inhabitants on the mons Caelius (Caelian Hill) in Rome.

There is controversy about how and when Aeneas and his Trojans were adopted as ethnic ancestors by the Romans. One theory is that the Romans appropriated the legend from the Etruscans, who in turn acquired themselves the legend from the Greeks. There is evidence that the Aeneas legend was well known among the Etruscans by 500 BC: excavations at the ancient Etruscan city of Veii discovered a series of statuettes portraying Aeneas fleeing Troy carrying his father on his back, as in the legend. Indeed, the Bulgarian linguist Vladimir Georgiev argued that the original Etruscans were in fact descendants of those Trojan refugees and that the Aeneas legend has a historical basis. Georgiev disputes the mainstream view that Etruscan was not Indo-European: he argues that Etruscan was closely related to the Indo-European Hittite and Lydian languages. Georgiev's thesis hasn't received support from other scholars. Excavations at Troy have yielded a single written document, a letter in Luwian. But as Luwian (which certainly is closely related to Hittite) was used as a kind of diplomatic lingua franca in Anatolia, it cannot be argued conclusively that Luwian was the everyday language of Troy. Cornell points out that the Romans may have acquired the legend directly from the Italiote Greeks. The earliest Greek literary reference to Rome as a foundation of Aeneas dates to c. 400 BC. There is also much archaeological evidence of contacts between the cities of archaic Latium and the Greek world e.g. the archaic sanctuary of the Penates at Lavinium, which shows "heavy Greek influence in architectural design and religious ideology", according to Cornell.

Whatever the origin of the legend, it is clear that the Latins had no historical connection with Aeneas and none of their cities were founded by Trojan refugees. Furthermore, Cornell regards the city of Alba Longa itself as probably mythical. Early Latial-culture remains have been discovered on the shore of the Alban lake, but they indicate a series of small villages, not an urbanised city-state. In any case, traces of the earliest phase of Latial culture also occur at Rome at the same time (c. 1000 BC), so archaeology cannot be used to support the tradition that Rome was founded by people from Alba Longa. If Alba Longa did not exist, then nor did the "Alban kings", whose genealogy was almost certainly fabricated to "prove" Romulus' descent from Aeneas. The genealogy's dubious nature is shown by the fact that it ascribes the 14 Alban kings an average reign of 30 years' duration, an implausibly high figure. The false nature of the Aeneas-Romulus link is also demonstrated by the fact that, in some early versions of the tradition, Romulus is denoted as Aeneas' grandson, despite being chronologically separated from Aeneas by some 450 years.

=== Romulus ===
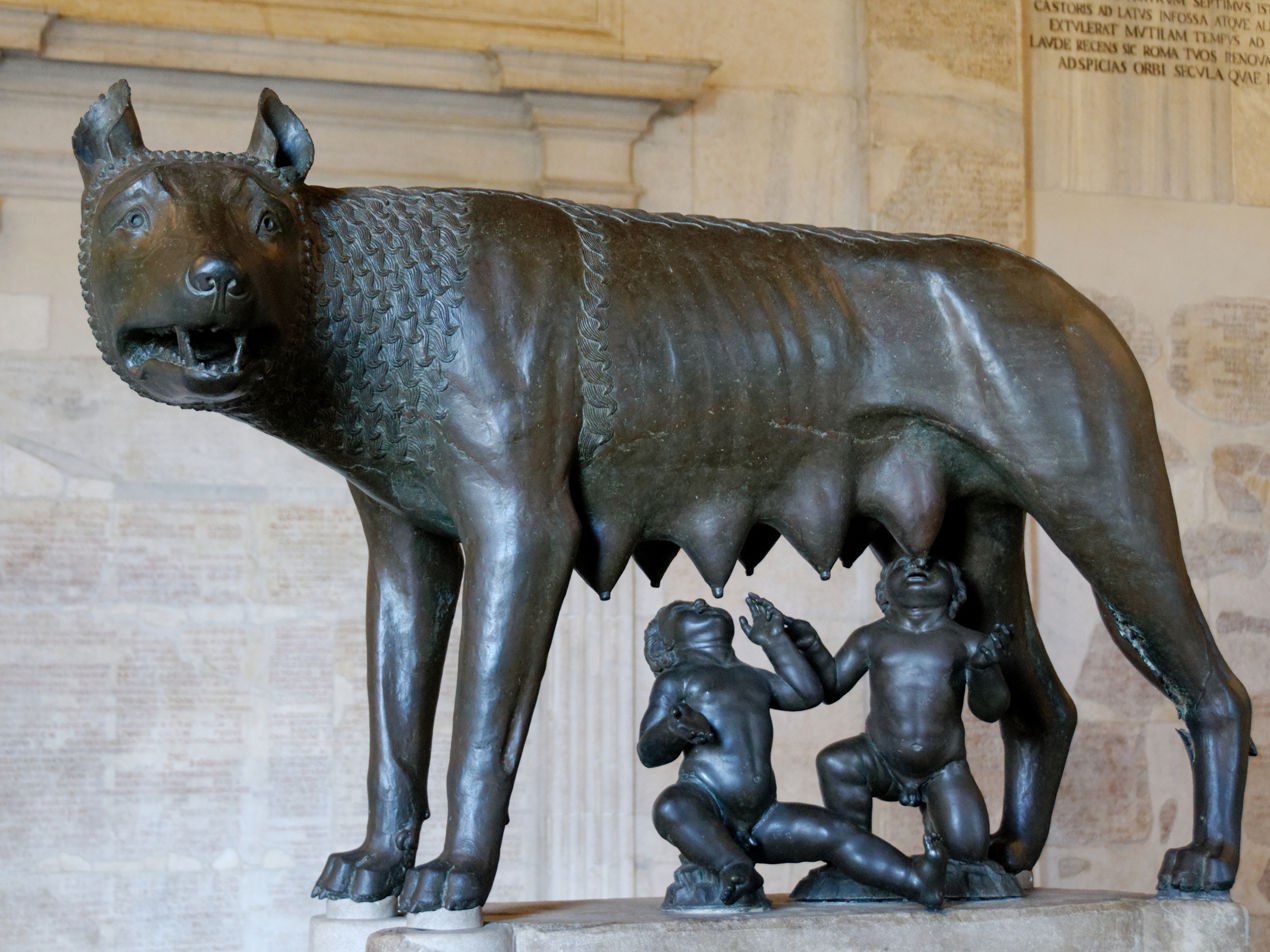
The Capitoline Wolf, a bronze statue of the She-Wolf suckling the twins Romulus and Remus. Date is controversial. Traditionally it has been attributed to the Etruscans and dated to the 5th century BC (although the twins were added in the 15th century). More recent scholarship dates the original piece to the medieval era. Capitoline Museum, Rome

Romulus himself was the subject of the famous legend of the suckling she-wolf (lupa) that kept Romulus and his twin Remus alive in a cave on the Palatine Hill (the Lupercal) after they had been thrown into the river Tiber on the orders of their wicked uncle, Amulius. The latter had usurped the throne of Alba from the twins' grandfather, king Numitor, and then confined their mother, Rhea Silvia, to the Vestal convent. They were washed ashore by the river, and after a few days with the wolf, were rescued by shepherds.

Mainstream scholarly opinion regards Romulus as an entirely mythical character, and the legend fictitious. On this view, Romulus was a name fabricated to provide Rome with an eponymous founding hero, a common feature of classical foundation-myths; it is possible that Romulus was named after Rome instead of vice versa. The name contains the Latin diminutive -ulus, so it means simply "Roman" or "little Roman". It has been suggested that the name "Roma" was of Etruscan origin, or that it was derived from the Latin word ruma ("teat"), presumably because the shape of the Palatine Hill and/or Capitoline Hill resembled a woman's breasts. If the city was named after Romulus, it is plausible that he was historical. Nevertheless, Cornell argues that "Romulus probably never existed... His biography is a complex mixture of legend and folk-tale, interspersed with antiquarian speculation and political propaganda".

In contrast, Andrea Carandini, an archaeologist who has spent most of his career excavating central Rome, advanced the theory that Romulus was a historical figure who indeed founded the city in c. 753 BC, as related by the ancient chroniclers, by ploughing a symbolic sacred furrow to define the city's boundary. But Carandini's views have received scant support among fellow scholars.

In contrast to the legend of Aeneas, which was clearly imported into the Latin world from an extraneous culture, it appears that the Romulus legend of the suckling she-wolf is a genuine indigenous Latin myth.

== Political unification under Rome (550–338 BC) ==
The traditional number of Latin communities for the purposes of the joint religious festivals is given as 30 in the sources. The same number is reported, probably erroneously, as the membership of the Romano-Latin military alliance, labelled the "Latin League" by modern scholars. But it appears that c. 500 BC there were just 15 independent Latin city-states in Latium Vetus, including Rome itself (the other 15 were annexed by the former as they expanded, especially Rome). The size of the city-state territories in c. 500 BC were estimated by Beloch (1926):

Latin city-states in existence c. 500 BC
| Name of city | Modern name/ location | Est. territory (km^{2}) | Notes |
|---|---|---|---|
| Roma | Roma | 822 | |
| Tibur | Tivoli | 351 | |
| Praeneste | Palestrina | 263 | |
| Ardea | Ardea | 199 | |
| Lavinium | Pratica di Mare, Pomezia | 164 | |
| Lanuvium | Lanuvio | 84 | |
| Labici | Monte Compatri | 72 | |
| Nomentum | Mentana | 72 | |
| Gabii | Castiglione | 54 | |
| Fidenae | Villa Spada, Rome | 51 | |
| Tusculum | nr. Frascati | 50 | |
| Aricia | Ariccia | 45 | |
| Pedum | Gallicano nel Lazio | 43 | |
| Crustumerium | Marcigliana Vecchia, Settebagni | 40 | |
| Ficula | | 37 | |
| Total Size of Latium Vetus | | 2,347 | |

The table above shows the tiny size of Latium Vetus - only about two-thirds the size of the English county of Kent. Rome was by far the largest state, controlling some 35% of the total land area. The next four largest states ranged from just under half the size of Rome down to a fifth of the size; the remaining ten ranged from a tenth of the size down to less than a twentieth.

From an early stage, the external relations of the Latin city-states were dominated by their largest and most powerful member, Rome. The vast amount of archaeological evidence uncovered since the 1970s has conclusively discredited A. Alföldi's once-fashionable theory that Rome was an insignificant settlement until about 500 BC, and thus that the Republic was not established before about 450, and possibly as late as 400 BC. There is now no doubt that Rome was a unified city (as opposed to a group of separate hilltop settlements) by c. 625 BC and had become the second-largest city in Italy (after Tarentum, 510 hectares) by around 550 BC, when it had an area of about 285 hectares (1.1 sq mile) and an estimated population of 35,000. Rome was thus about half the size of contemporary Athens (585 hectares, including Piraeus) and far larger than any other Latin city.

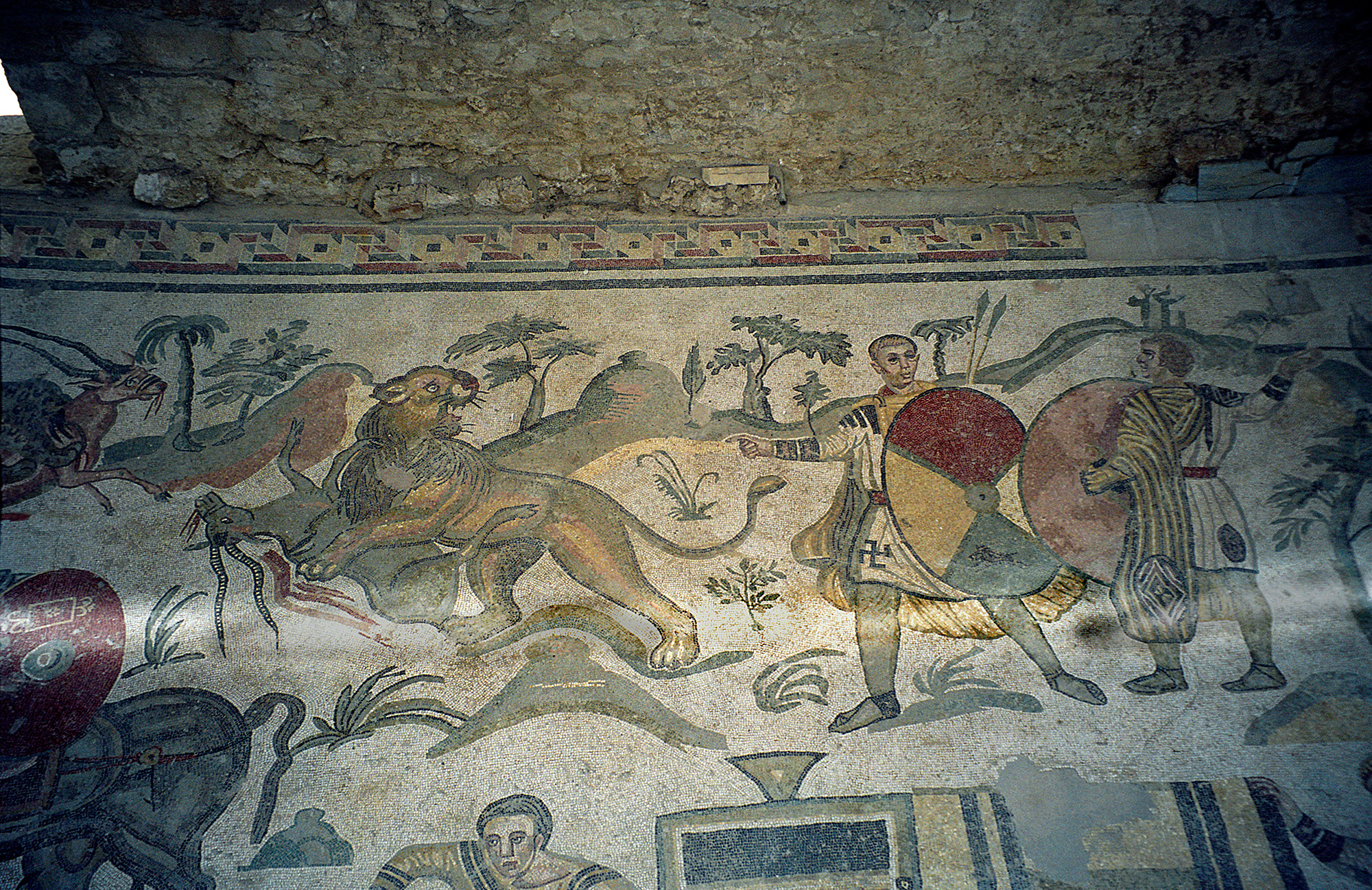
Detail of a 4th-century AD Roman mosaic showing two hunters wearing the dress of officers of the Late Roman army. Note the swastika emblem on the left-hand officer's tunic. From Piazza Armerina, Sicily

The size of Rome at this time lends credence to the Roman tradition, dismissed by Alföldi, that in the late regal period (550–500 BC), traditionally the rule of the Tarquin dynasty, Rome established its political hegemony over the other city-states of Old Latium. According to Livy, king Tarquin the Proud bound the Latin city-states into a military alliance under Roman leadership. Reportedly, Tarquin also annexed Pometia (later Satricum) and Gabii; established control over Tusculum by a marriage alliance with its leader, Octavus Mamilius; and established Roman colonies at Signia and Circeii. He was engaged in besieging Ardea when the revolt against his monarchy broke out. Rome's political control over Latium Vetus is apparently confirmed by the text of the first recorded Romano-Carthaginian treaty, dated by the ancient Greek historian Polybius to 507 BC, a date accepted by Cornell (although some scholars argue a much later date). The treaty describes the Latin cities of Lavinium and Ardea, among others, as "Roman subjects". Although the text acknowledged that not all the Latin cities were subjects of Rome, it clearly placed them under Rome's hegemony, as it provided that if Carthage captured any Latin city, it was obliged to hand it over to Rome's control. Rome's sphere of influence is implied as extending as far as Terracina, 100 km to the south.

The fall of the Roman monarchy was probably a more lengthy, violent and international process than the swift, bloodless and internal coup related by tradition. The role of the Etruscan king Lars Porsenna, of Clusium, who led an invasion of Roman territory at the time of the revolution, was probably distorted for propaganda reasons by later Roman chroniclers. Livy claims that Porsenna aimed to restore Tarquin to his throne, but failed to take Rome after a siege. Tacitus suggests that Porsenna's army succeeded in occupying the city. The fact that there is no evidence of Tarquin's restoration during this occupation has led some scholars to suggest that it Porsenna was the real agent of the Tarquin's downfall, and that he aimed to replace him as king of Rome. Any danger of an Etruscan takeover of Rome was removed by Porsenna's defeat at Aricia in 504 BC.

There followed a war between Rome and the other Latin city-states, which probably took advantage of the political turmoil in Rome to attempt to regain/preserve their independence. It appears that Tusculum and Aricia took the lead in organising an anti-Roman alliance. One ancient source names Egerius Baebius, the leader of Tusculum, as the "Latin dictator" (i.e. commander-in-chief of the Latin forces). It appears that Baebius dedicated a sacred grove to Diana at lucus Ferentinae (a wood near Aricia) in c. 500 BC in the presence of representatives of Latin states, including Tusculum, Aricia, Lanuvium, Lavinium, Cora, Tibur, Pometia and Ardea. This event was probably contemporaneous with, and connected with, the launch of the Latin alliance. The Latins could apparently count on the support of the Volsci Italic tribe. In addition, they were joined by the deposed Roman king Tarquin the Proud and his remaining followers.

The Romans apparently prevailed, scoring a notable victory over the Latin forces at Lake Regillus sometime in the period 499-493 BC (the exact year is disputed among scholars).

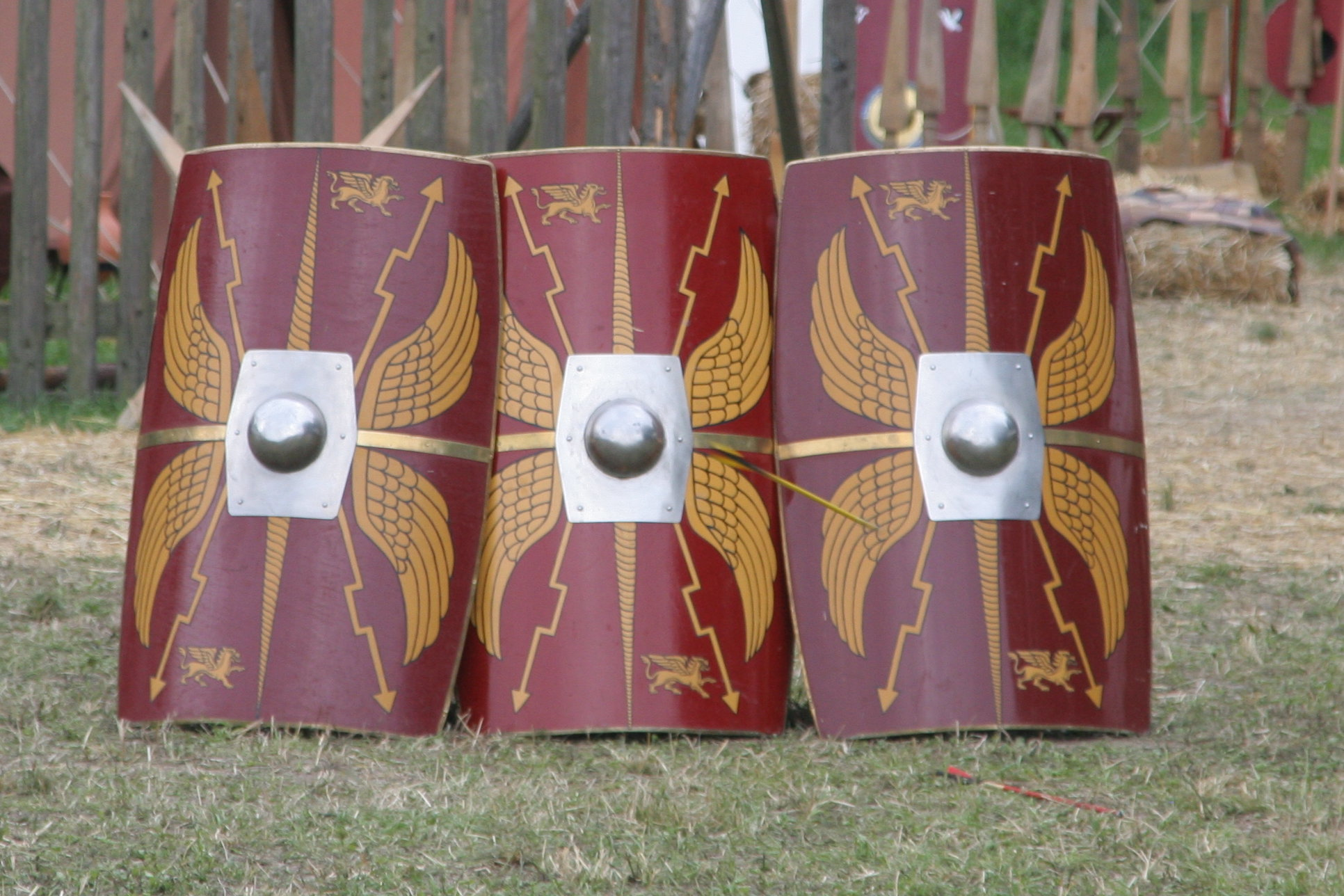
Modern replicas of scuta (shields), as used by the legions of the Imperial Roman army. Note the alae et fulgura ("wings-and-thunderbolts") emblem, representing Jupiter, the highest Roman god

Instead of restoring their previous hegemony, the Romans apparently settled for a military alliance on equal terms with the Latins. According to the sources, the foedus Cassianum (Cassian treaty) was a bilateral treaty between the Romans on one side and the other Latin city-states combined. It provided for a perpetual peace between the two parties; a defensive alliance by which the parties pledged mutual assistance in case of attack; a promise not to aid or allow passage to each other's enemies; the equal division of spoils of war (half to Rome, half to the other Latins) and provisions to regulate trade between the parties. In addition the treaty probably provided for overall command of the allies' joint forces to alternate between a Roman and a commander from one of the other Latin city-states each year. As the nature of the Tarquinian hegemony over the Latins is unknown, it is impossible to tell how the terms of the Cassian treaty differed from those imposed by the Tarquins. But it is likely that Tarquin rule was more onerous, involving the payment of tribute, while the Republican terms simply involved a military alliance. The impetus to form such an alliance was probably provided by the acute insecurity caused by a phase of migration and invasion of the lowland areas by Italic mountain tribes in the period after 500 BC. The Latins faced repeated incursions by the Hernici, Aequi and Volsci, whose territories surrounded Latium Vetus on its eastern and southern sides.

The new Romano-Latin military alliance proved strong enough to repel the incursions of the Italic mountain tribes in the period 500–400 BC. During the succeeding century, after Rome had recovered from the catastrophic Gallic invasion of 390 BC, the Romans began a phase of expansionism. In addition to the establishment of a series of Latin colonies on territories annexed from the mountain tribes, Rome annexed a number of neighbouring Latin city-states in steady succession. The increasing threat posed by Roman encroachment led the more powerful Latin states, such as Praeneste, to attempt to defend their independence and territorial integrity by challenging Rome, often in alliance with their erstwhile enemies, mountain-tribes such as the Volsci. Finally, in 341 BC, all the Latin city-states combined in what proved to be a final effort to regain/preserve their independence. The so-called Latin War ended in 338 with a decisive Roman victory, following which Rome annexed most of Latium Vetus. A few of the larger Latin states, such as Praeneste and Tibur, were allowed to retain a degree of political autonomy, but only in a subordinate status as Roman socii ("allies"), tied to Rome by treaties of military alliance.

== Genetic studies ==
Ethnolinguistic map of Italy in the Iron Age, before the Roman expansion and conquest of Italy.

A genetic study published in Science in November 2019 examined the remains of six Latin males buried near Rome between 900 BC and 200 BC. They carried the paternal haplogroups R-M269, T-L208, R-P311, R-PF7589 and R-P312 (two samples), and the maternal haplogroups H1aj1a, T2c1f, H2a, U4a1a, H11a and H10. These examined individuals were distinguished from preceding populations of Italy by the presence of 30% steppe ancestry. Two out of six individuals from Latin burials were found have a mixture of local Iron Age ancestry and ancestry from an Eastern Mediterranean population. Among modern populations, four out of six were closest to Northern and Central Italians, and then Spaniards, while the other two were closest to Southern Italians. The Iron Age and early Republican Latin and Etruscan samples overlaps with present-day Italians and other west Mediterranean populations. Overall, the genetic differentiation between the Latins, Etruscans and the preceding proto-Villanovan population of Italy was found to be insignificant.

Examined individuals from the city of Rome during the time of the Roman Empire (27 BCE – 300 CE) bore far less genetic resemblance to Rome's founding populations, and were instead shifted towards the Eastern Mediterranean and Middle East. The Imperial population of Rome was found to have been extremely diverse, with barely any of the examined individuals being of primarily local, central Italian ancestry. It was suggested that the observed genetic shift in the city's founding populations was a result of heavy migration of merchants and slaves from the populous urban centres of the Middle East and Greece. During late antiquity, after the Imperial era, Rome's population was drastically reduced as a result of political instability, epidemics and economic changes. In this period, more local or central Italian ancestry is evident in Rome; its inhabitants started to again approximate present-day Italians, and can be modeled as a genetic mixture of Imperial-era inhabitants of the city of Rome and populations from central or northern Italy. In the following early medieval period, invasions of barbarians may have brought central and/or northern European ancestry into Rome, resulting in the further loss of genetic link to the Eastern Mediterranean and Middle East. By the Middle Ages, the people of Rome again genetically resembled central and southern European populations.

=== Physical appearance ===
As regards the data on the pigmentation of eyes, hair and skin, the following results were obtained from the study on ancient DNA of the 11 individuals of the Iron Age/Republican period, coming from Latium and Abruzzo, and the 27 individuals of Medieval/Early Modern period, coming from Latium.

For Iron Age/Republic period, the eye color is blue in 27% of the examined and dark in the remaining 73%. Hair color is 9% blond or dark blond and 91% dark brown or black. The skin color is intermediate for 82%, intermediate or dark for 9% and dark or very dark for the remaining 9%.

By contrast, the following results were obtained for Medieval/Early Modern period: the eye color is blue in 26% of the examined and dark in the remaining 74%. Hair color is 22% blond or dark blond, 11% red and 67% dark brown or black. The skin color is pale for 15%, intermediate for 68%, intermediate or dark for 10% and dark or very dark for the remaining 7%.

== See also ==
- List of ancient peoples of Italy
- List of ancient Italic peoples
- Valle Latina

== Sources ==
=== Ancient sources ===
- Dio Cassius Roman History (c. AD 250)
- Dionysius of Halicarnassus Roman Antiquities (c. 10 BC)
- Homer Iliad (c. 800 BC)
- Livy Ab urbe condita (c. AD 20)

=== Modern sources ===
- Alföldi, Andreas (1966): Early Rome and the Latins
- Antonio, Margaret L.; et al. (November 8, 2019). "Ancient Rome: A genetic crossroads of Europe and the Mediterranean". Science. 366 (6466). American Association for the Advancement of Science: 708–714. Bibcode:2019Sci...366..708A. doi:10.1126/science.aay6826. PMC 7093155. PMID 31699931.
- Cornell, T. J. (1995). The Beginnings of Rome.
- Encyclopædia Britannica 15th Ed. (1995): Micropædia: "Latium"
- Fortson, Benjamin W. (2010). Indo-European Language and Culture.
- Georgiev, Vladimir I. (1979). La Lingua e l'Origine degli Etruschi.
- Mommsen, Theodor (1894). The History of Rome. Macmillan.
- Wade, Lizzie (November 8, 2019). "Immigrants from the Middle East shaped Rome". Science. 366 (6466). American Association for the Advancement of Science: 673. Bibcode:2019Sci...366..673W. doi:10.1126/science.366.6466.673. PMID 31699914.
