= List of Roman tribes =

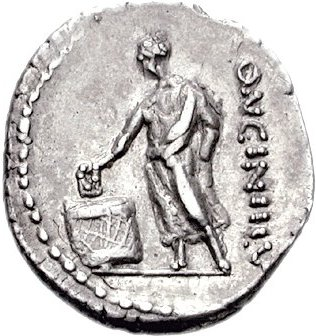
Voter casting ballot on a Roman denarius of 63 BC

Tribes (Latin: tribus) were groupings of citizens in ancient Rome, originally based on location. Voters were eventually organized by tribes, with each Roman tribe having an equal vote in the Tribal Assembly.

== Original tribes ==
Latin tribus perhaps derives from the Latin word for "three", trēs. The Romans believed that through much of the early regal period of Roman history, there were only three tribes:

- Ramnes
- Tities
- Luceres

These names were also preserved in the names of six of the later centuries of Roman equites.

== Later tribes ==
Livy records that in 495 BC the number of tribes was increased to 21, and the number of tribes reached 35 in 242 BC and was not expanded further.

=== Urban tribes ===
Attributed by Livy to the sixth Roman king, Servius Tullius, the urban tribes were named for districts of the city and were the largest and had the least political power. In the later Republic, poorer people living in the city of Rome itself typically belonged to one of these tribes. Freedmen were also traditionally assigned to one of these tribes.

- Collina
- Esquilina
- Palatina
- Suburana

=== Rural tribes ===
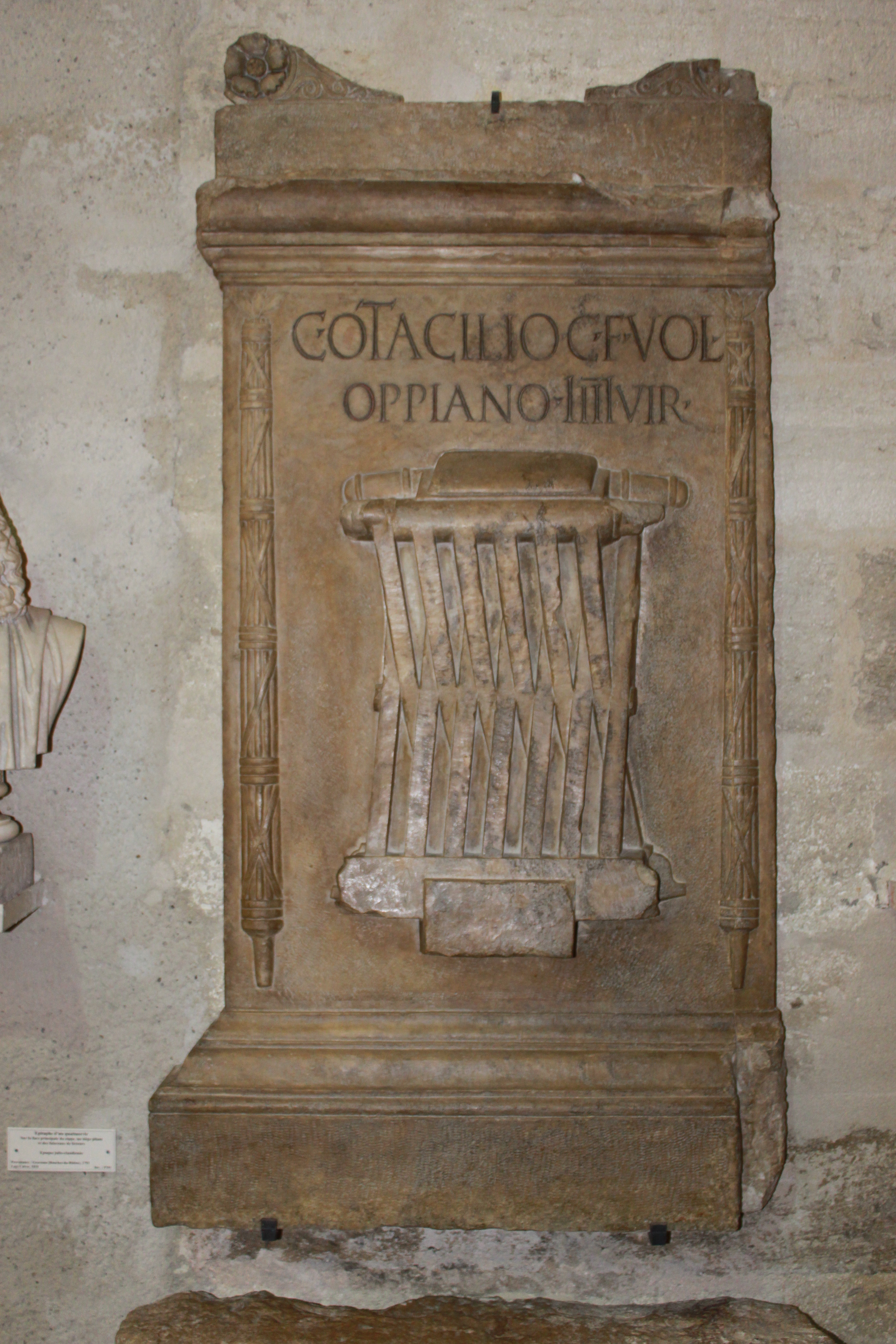
Inscription (CIL 13.1029) from the Narbonensis recording the enrollment of Gaius Otacilius in the tribus Voltinia (abbreviated VOL), into which Gallic citizens were frequently placed

Landowners and aristocracy traditionally belonged to the 31 smaller rural tribes. Many rural tribes derive from prominent Roman gentes, or family names, such as Cornelia or Fabia.

- Aemilia
- Aniensis
- Arniensis
- Camilia
- Claudia
- Clustumina
- Cornelia
- Fabia
- Falerna/Falerina
- Galeria
- Horatia
- Lemonia
- Maecia
- Menenia
- Oufentina/Oufetina
- Papiria
- Poblilia
- Pollia
- Pomptina/Pontina
- Pupinia
- Quirina
- Romilia
- Sabatia/Sabatina
- Scaptia
- Sergia
- Stellatina
- Teretina
- Tromentina
- Velina
- Voltinia/Votinia
- Voturia

=== The official order of the tribes ===
There was an official order of the tribes. Literature and archaeological documentation show that the urban tribes are enumerated according to a counter-clockwise circuit of the city. On that basis, Lily Ross Taylor suggested that the same held for the rural tribes.

Archaeological findings of tesserae led Michael Crawford to suggest that the tribes were ordered according to the principal roads leading counter-clockwise from Rome (Ostiensis, Appia, Latina, Praenestina, Valeria, Salaria, Flaminia and Clodia).

Abbreviation of the tribe	Name of the tribe (Note: Italicized the rural tribes derived from Roman gentes)	Character of the tribe	Date of establishment	# (Note: In bold the number documented by literature and archeological evidence)
AEM	Aemilia	older (Note: Before 495 BC) rural tribe	6th century BC	VIII
ANI	Aniensis	later rural tribe	299 BC	XXIV
ARN	Arnensis	later rural tribe	387 BC	XXXV
CAM	Camilia	older rural tribe	6th century BC	XXIII
CLA	Claudia	older rural tribe	504 BC	XXII
CLU	Clustumina	older rural tribe	495 BC	XXVIII
COL	Collina	urban tribe	6th century BC	IV
COR	Cornelia	older rural tribe	6th century BC	XXI
ESQ	Esquilina	urban tribe	6th century BC	III
FAB	Fabia	older rural tribe	6th century BC	XXV
FAL	Falerna	later rural tribe	318 BC	XIII
GAL	Galeria	older rural tribe	6th century BC	XXXIII
HOR	Horatia	older rural tribe	6th century BC	IX
LEM	Lemonia	older rural tribe	6th century BC	XIV
MAE	Maecia	later rural tribe	332 BC	X
MEN	Menenia	older rural tribe	6th century BC	XIX
OVF	Oufentina	later rural tribe	318 BC	XVI
PAL	Palatina	urban tribe	6th century BC	II
PAP	Papiria	older rural tribe	6th century BC	XV
POB	Poblilia (Note: Poblilia is the only one of the later rural tribes with a gens name, but, unlike the old patrician tribal names, Poblilia was a well-known plebeian nomen.)	later rural tribe	358 BC	XX
POL	Pollia	older rural tribe	6th century BC	XXVI
POM	Pomptina	later rural tribe	358 BC	XII
PVP	Pupinia	older rural tribe	6th century BC	XVIII
QVI	Quirina	later rural tribe	241 BC	XXIX
ROM	Romilia	older rural tribe	6th century BC	V
SAB	Sabatina	later rural tribe	387 BC	XXXIV
SCA	Scaptia	later rural tribe	332 BC	XI
SER	Sergia	older rural tribe	6th century BC	XXVII
STE	Stellatina	later rural tribe	387 BC	XXXI
SVB	Suburana	urban tribe	6th century BC	I
TER	Teretina	later rural tribe	299 BC	XVII
TRO	Tromentina	later rural tribe	387 BC	XXXII
VEL	Velina	later rural tribe	241 BC	XXX
VOL	Voltinia	older rural tribe	6th century BC	VI
VOT	Voturia	older rural tribe	6th century BC	VII

== See also ==
- List of Roman gentes
