= Catali =

Tribe belonging to the Venetic peoples

The Catali were a Celtic Alpine tribe living in the area of modern Trieste during the Roman period.

== Name ==
They are mentioned as Catali by Pliny (1st c. AD).

The prevailing view in modern scholarship is that the Catali were a Celtic people. The root of their name cat- has been compared with that of the nearby Catubrium and Catubrini, both derived from the Gaulish stem catu- ('combat, battle'). Some earlier 20th-century scholarship identified the Catali as Illyrians.

== Geography ==
Augustus incorporated the Carni and the neighbouring Catali into the colony of Tergeste (modern Trieste).

In the 1st century AD, Pliny listed the Catali, together with the Fecusses, Subocrini, and Menoncaleni, among the peoples described as "illustrious Alpine inhabitants from Pola to the region of Tergeste" (incolae Alpium … inlustres a Pola ad Tergestis regionem).
