= Venetulani =

The Venetulani are among the 53 peoples of Latium Vetus that Pliny the Elder records as having perished without leaving a trace (interiere sine vestigiis). They are counted among the 30 Alban communities that carried out and participated in sacrificial activities on Mons Albanus. The name is believed to derive from a Veneti settlement, which may have been called Venetulum.

== See also ==
- Old Latium
- Adriatic Veneti
- Pliny the Elder
- List of ancient peoples of Italy

== Notes ==
This article incorporates text by R. Talbert, Sean Gillies, Tom Elliott, Jeffrey Becker available under the CC BY 1.0 license.
