= Lopsi =

Lopsi is the name of a Liburnian tribe inhabiting the mountains along the eastern coast of the Adriatic before and during the Roman Empire, specifically present-day Velebit.

The tribe was mentioned by Pliny the Elder in his Naturalis Historia, and it borrowed its name to one of the Roman cities on the coast, Lopsica (present day Sveti Juraj in Croatia). The name has survived to present day as a place name, as well as the family surname Lopac.

== See also ==
- List of ancient tribes in Illyria
