= Secusses =

Tribe belonging to the Venetic peoples

Secusses was the name of a tribe belonging to the Venetic peoples that are sometimes confused with Illyrians.
