= Opici =

Ancient Italic people

The Opici were an ancient italic people of the Latino-Faliscan group who lived in the region of Campania. They settled in the area in the late Bronze Age but their territory was later conquered during the Iron Age by the Osci, another Italic people but of the Osco-Umbrian group.

== Sources ==
- Giacomo Devoto, Preistoria e storia delle regioni d'Italia, 1a ed., Florence, Sansoni Università, 1974. P. 123.
- Giacomo Devoto, Gli antichi Italici, 2a ed., Florence, Vallecchi, 1951. P. 137.
