= Carni =

Gaulish tribe of the Eastern Alps

The Carni (Greek: Καρνίοι) were a tribe of the Eastern Alps in classical antiquity of Celtic language and culture, settling in the mountains separating Noricum and Venetia. They probably gave their name to Carso, Carnia, Carinthia, and Carniola.

== History ==
They are usually considered a Gaulish tribe, although some associate them with the Venetic peoples, a group closely related to but probably distinct from the Celts.

Their area of settlement isn't known with precision. Strabo confines them to the mountains, while Ptolemy assigns them two cities near the Adriatic coast.

They are likely eponymous of the regions of Carnia, Carniola and Carinthia.

The first historical date related to the arrival of the Carni in "Akileja" is 186 BC, when some 50,000 Carni, composed of armed men, women and children, descended towards the plains (in which they previously used to winter) and on a hill they founded a stable defensive settlement, Akileja.

=== Roman expansion ===
Roman Republic troops forced the Carni back into the Alps, destroyed their settlement, and founded a Roman defensive settlement at the northeast boundary. The new settlement was named Aquileia, after the former Celtic name Akileja. The triumvirs that founded that settlement were Publius Scipio Nasica, Caius Flaminius, and Lucius Manlius Acidinus.

In order to stem the Roman expansion and to acquire the fertile and more hospitable plains, the Carni tried to form alliances with the Histrian, the Iapydes, and the Taurisci Celts. As Rome, in turn, was more and more becoming aware of the impending danger coming from the Carni and as it wanted to accelerate its own expansion, it sent to the north-east the legions of consul Marcus Aemilius Scaurus, who finally defeated the Carni in the battle of 15 November 115 BC.

The Carni submitted to the Roman Republic in the 2nd century BC, accepting its commands and its concessions. They received then the permission to populate and colonize the plain between the Julian pre-Alps and the Livenza river they had already tried to occupy previously in conflict with both the Romans and Veneti.

In the meantime, Aquileia enlarged its importance. It became a Municipium Romanum in 90 BC. It was an important commercial and hand-craft production centre. Also it was the main port on the Adriatic sea and a garrison settlement.

In Late Antiquity, under the pressure of Germanic and Slavic peoples, the mountainous area populated by the Latinized Carni shrank gradually narrowing to Carnia and Friulian plains alone, and accepting migration contributions from Carniola, Carinthia and from other areas of the Empire. The phenomenon probably stabilized under the Lombards' domination of Friuli.

== See also ==
- Ancient peoples of Italy
- Ancient history of Slovenia
- Carnia
- Friuli

== Bibliography ==
- Grassi, Niccolò: Notizie storiche della Provincia della Carnia, Udine, fratelli Gallici alla Fontana, 1782, VIII+224 p.
- Kruta, Venceslas: I celti e il Mediterraneo, Jaca Book, 2004, 78 p., ISBN 88-16-43628-X, ISBN 978-88-16-43628-2
- Kruta, Venceslas: La grande storia dei celti. La nascita, l'affermazione e la decadenza, Newton & Compton, 2003, 512 p., ISBN 88-8289-851-2, ISBN 978-88-8289-851-9
- Kruta, Venceslas & Manfredi, Valerio M.: "I celti d'Italia", Mondadori, 2000 (Collana: Oscar storia), ISBN 88-04-47710-5, ISBN 978-88-04-47710-5
- Violante, Antonio; introduzione di Venceslas Kruta: I Celti a sud delle Alpi, (Silvana, Milano), 1993 (series: Popoli dell'Italia Antica), 137 p., ill., fot.; 32 cm; ISBN 88-366-0442-0
