= Binbelli =

Ancient Ligurian people of Cisalpine Italy

The Binbelli (variant Bimbelli) were an ancient Ligurian people of Cisalpine Italy, known only from a single mention by Pliny the Elder.

== Name ==
Pliny names the Binbelli in his enumeration of the 'most notable Ligurians' (Ligurum celeberrimi). Having distinguished those beyond the Alps, he lists on the Italian side, in order, the Veneni, Turri, Soti, Bagienni, Statielli, Binbelli, Maielli, Caburriates, Casmonates and Velleiates, the Binbelli falling between the Statielli and the Maielli.

Nothing else is recorded of them. The earlier reading Vibelli is erroneous. The manuscript tradition of Pliny's list is in any case unstable.

The ethnonym carries the suffix -elli, which has been noted as concentrated among the peoples of central Liguria, shared with the Statielli and the Maielli, and which also occurs in Gaul, in the Tarbelli of Aquitania and the Unelli of Gallia Lugdunensis. Giulia Petracco Sicardi sees the suffix attached to a base *bib(o)- with a nasal infix, of uncertain origin.

== Geography ==
They are cited by Piny between the Statielli (around present-day Acqui Terme) and the Maielli.

Ligurum celeberrimi ultra Alpes Sallui, Deciates, Oxubi, citra Veneni, Turri, Soti, Bagienni, Statielli, Binbelli, Maielli, Caburriates, Casmonates, Velleiates et quorum oppida in ora proxime dicemus.

Of the Ligurians beyond the Alps the most famous are the Sallui, Deciates and Oxubi; on this side, the Veneni, Turri, Soti, Vagienni, Statielli, Binbelli, Maielli, Cuburriates, Casmonates, Velleiates, and the tribes whose towns on the coast we shall mention next.

— Pliny the Elder, Naturalis Historia 3:47
