= Caburriates =

Ancient Ligurian people of Cisalpine Italy

The Caburriates were an ancient Ligurian people of Cisalpine Italy, identified with the inhabitants of Forum Vibii Caburrum (modern Cavour, in Piedmont). They are named only in Pliny the Elder's list of the most renowned Ligurians, in a passage whose reading is uncertain.

== Name ==
=== Attestation ===
The Caburriates appear in Pliny's enumeration of the most renowned Ligurians (Ligurum celeberrimi). Having distinguished those beyond the Alps, he lists on the Italian side, in order, the Veneni, Turri, Soti, Bagienni, Statielli, Binbelli, Maielli, Caburriates, Casmonates and Velleiates.

Ligurum celeberrimi ultra Alpes Sallui, Deciates, Oxubi, citra Veneni, Turri, Soti, Bagienni, Statielli, Binbelli, Maielli, Caburriates, Casmonates, Velleiates et quorum oppida in ora proxime dicemus.

The most renowned Ligurians beyond the Alps are the Sallui, Deciates and Oxubi; on the near side, the Veneni, Turri, Soti, Bagienni, Statielli, Binbelli, Maielli, Caburriates, Casmonates and Velleiates, together with those whose coastal towns are named below.

— Pliny the Elder, Naturalis Historia 3:47

=== Form and identification ===
The reading of the name in Pliny is uncertain. The manuscripts give variously euburriates, euburiates, cuburiates and cuburriates, and Euburiates was the form generally printed until the mid-19th century. The form Caburriates, proposed by Detlef Detlefsen in 1886, has since been adopted by most editors, and on it the people are identified with the inhabitants of Forum Vibii Caburrum (modern Cavour).

A parallel list of Ligurians in Florus has the same first three peoples, followed by a name transmitted as Buriates and emended by editors to Euburiates. These Euburiates of Florus, a coastal people of the Maritime Alps subdued by the proconsul Q. Baebius around 180/170 BC, are usually treated as a separate people on geographical grounds.

A minority of scholars reject both the reading and the identification. Ubaldo Formentini proposed in 1949 to read Euburiates in Pliny and to identify them with the Euburiates of Florus. Andrea Balbo has likewise argued that the better reading is Euburiates or Buriates, and that the identification with Cavour is circular, since it rests on a single inscription, on which the community's name survives only as the truncated Cabur[, and on a name that is itself an editorial conjecture.

== Geography ==
The territory of the Caburriates is identified with that of Forum Vibii (modern Cavour), on the western edge of the Po plain at the foot of the Alps, in present-day Piedmont. Under Claudius, territories south of the Po were attached to the kingdom of the younger Cottius. Theodor Mommsen counted the territory of the Caburriates among them, and Guy Barruol argued that the annexation makes sense only if that territory adjoined the land of the Segusini on the middle Dora.

== Settlement ==
The site identified as the oppidum of the Caburriates lies at Cavour, below the hill of La Rocca that overlooks the modern town from the south. Until the early first century AD the settlement lay on the summit and northern slope of La Rocca, where dry-stone hut floors and finds of the second and first centuries BC mark the occupation. Its necropolis, on the northern edge of the imperial-era town, was in continuous use from the first century BC, though its oldest graves date to the sixth and fifth centuries BC and its latest to the third and fourth centuries AD. The site has not been excavated, and apart from baths recorded by an inscription no public buildings are known. The settlement received municipal status, probably in the Caesarian period, as Forum Vibii.
