= List of Latin place names in Italy and Malta =

This list includes countries and regions in the Italian Peninsula that were part of the Roman Empire, or that were given Latin place names in historical reference.

== Background ==
Until the Modern Era, Latin was the common language for scholarship and mapmaking. During the 19th and 20th centuries, German scholars in particular made significant contributions to the study of historical place names, or Ortsnamenkunde. These studies have, in turn, contributed to the study of genealogy. For genealogists and historians of pre-Modern Europe, knowing alternate names of places is vital to extracting information from both public and private records. Even specialists in this field point out, however, that the information can be easily taken out of context, since there is a great deal of repetition of place names throughout Europe; reliance purely on apparent connections should therefore be tempered with valid historical methodology.

== Caveats and notes ==
Latin place names are not always exclusive to one place – for example, there were several Roman cities whose names began with Colonia and then a more descriptive term. During the Middle Ages, these were often shortened to just Colonia. One of these, Colonia Agrippinensis, retains the name today in the form of Cologne.

Early sources for Roman names show numerous variants and spellings of the Latin names.

The modern canonical name is listed first. Sources are listed chronologically. In general, only the earliest source is shown for each name, although many of the names are recorded in more than one of the sources. Where the source differs in spelling, or has other alternatives, these are listed following the source. As an aid to searching, variants are spelled completely, and listed in most likely chronology.

Superscripts indicate:

1. Latinized form of the Greek-derived name.
2. Latinized form of the Asian-derived name via Greek.
3. Altered Latinized form of the Greek-derived name.

== Cities and towns in Italy ==
Canonical Latin name (source(s): variant(s))	English name (native language(s)) – older name(s), (other language(s)), location (s)
Abellinum	Avellino (east of Naples)
Acelum	Asolo
Castrum Falconarii, Falconaria Maritima	Falconara Marittima
Aesis	Jesi
Aenaria, Pithecussa	Ischia
Agrigentum	Agrigento
Alba Pompeia	Alba, Piedmont
Albingaunum	Albenga
Albintemelium, Albintimilium	Ventimiglia
Altinum	Altino
Ameria	Amelia, Umbria
Ammurianum	Murano
Ampicium, Cortina Ampecanorum	Cortina d'Ampezzo
Antrona Scaranicum	Antrona Schieranco
Apua	Pontremoli
Aquae Statiellae, Aquae Statiellorum	Acqui Terme
Aquilia in Vestinis, Aquilia	L'Aquila
Arcionis	Riccione
Arconisium	Racconigi
Ardea	Ardea
Ariminum	Rimini
Arretium	Arezzo
Asculum Picenum	Ascoli Piceno
Assisium	Assisi, Umbria
Ateste	Este
Aternum	Pescara
Augusta	Augusta
Augusta Bagiennorum	Bene Vagienna
Augusta Praetoria Salassorum	Aosta
Augusta Taurinorum, Taurasia	Turin
Bardonisca	Bardonecchia
Baretium	Varese
Barium	Bari
Baruli	Barletta
Bassanum	Bassano del Grappa
Bauzanum, Pons Drusi	Bolzano
Bellunum	Belluno
Beneventum	Benevento
Bergomum	Bergamo
Bobium, Ebovium	Bobbio
Bononia	Bologna
Boreana	Burano
Burgus Sancti Dalmatii, Sanctus Dalmatius de Pedona	Burgo San Dalmazzo
Brindisium, Brundusium	Brindisi
Brixellum	Brescello
Brixia	Brescia
Brixino	Brixen (Bressanone)
Caesena	Cesena
Caesenaticum	Cesenatico
Caieta	Gaeta
Capreae	Capri
Capua	Santa Maria Capua Vetere
Caralis	Cagliari
Carreum Potentia	Chieri
Nissa, Calatanixecta	Caltanisetta
Callipolis	Gallipoli
Castrum Francorum (Venetia)	Castelfranco Veneto
Castrum Novum, Caferonianum, Castrum Novum Garfinianae	Castelnuovo di Garfagnana
Castrum Villarum	Castrovillari
Catana, Catina	Catania
Catholica	Cattolica
Centum Cellae	Civitavecchia
Cervia	Cervia
Civitas Sancti Romuli	Sanremo
Claterna	Claterna
Comum	Como
Conelianum	Conegliano
Cremona	Cremona
Decentianum	Desenzano del Garda
Dertona	Tortona
Drepanum	Trapani (west of Palermo)
Eporedia	Ivrea
Fabiranum, Fabrianum	Fabriano
Faesulae	Fiesole
Faventia	Faenza
Feltria	Feltre
Fidentia	Fidenza
Firmum (Picenum)	Fermo
Florentia	Florence (Firenze)
Forum Cornelii	Imola
Forum Fulvii	Villa del Foro, near Alessandria
Forum Iulii	Cividale del Friuli
Forum Livii	Forlì, Italy
Forum Popilii	Forlimpopoli
Forum Vibii Caburrum	Cavour
Fossa Clodia	Chioggia
Frusina	Frosinone
Fulginiae, Fulginium	Foligno
Genua	Genoa (Genova)
Goritia	Gorizia
Gressonetum ad Sanctum Joannem	Gressoney-Saint-Jean (Gressonei San Giovanni)
Hasta	Asti
Henna or Haenna	Enna
Herculaneum	Herculaneum (Ercolano)
Hispellum, Colonia Julia Hispellum	Spello, Umbria
Horta (Pedemontium), Horta Sancti Iulii	Orta San Giulio
Hostilia	Ostiglia
Iguvium, Eugubium	Gubbio, Umbria
Monticulus ad Padum, Mons Acutus, Bodincomagus, Industria	Monteu da Po
Iria	Voghera
Iulia Concordia	Concordia Sagittaria
Interamna Nahars, Interamna Nahartium	Terni, Umbria
Interamnia Praetutiana, Interamnia, Interamnium, Interamna	Teramo
Iulianum	Giugliano in Campania
Labellum	Lavello
Labro, Liburnum	Livorno
Laus Pompeia	Lodi
Libarna	near Serravalle Scrivia
Lilybaeum	Marsala
Linianum	Lignano Sabbiadoro
Livignum	Livigno
Locus Rotundus, Casalis Sancti Georgii	Locorotondo
Luca	Lucca
Luna	Luni
Lupiae	Lecce
Mantua	Mantua (Mantova)
Martanae Tudertinorum	Massa Martana
Mateola	Matera
Mediolanum	Milan (Milano)
Menasium	Menaggio
Messana	Messina
Mevania	Bevagna, Umbria
Modicia	Monza
Monopolis	Monopoli
Mons Belluni	Montebelluna
Mons Calerius	Moncalieri
Mons Falconis	Monfalcone
Mons Rotundus	Monterotondo
Morbenium	Morbegno
Mutina	Modena
Neapolis	Naples (Napoli)
Nola	Nola, near Naples
Novaria	Novara
Nursia	Norcia, Umbria
Olmedum	Olmedo
Opitergium	Oderzo
Oscela Lepontiorum	Domodossola
Palma	Palmanova
Panormus	Palermo
Parma	Parma
Patavium	Padua (Padova)
Perusia	Perugia
Petra Mularia	Piedimulera
Pisae	Pisa
Pisaurum	Pesaro
Pistoria, Pistorium or Pistoriae	Pistoia
Placentia	Piacenza
Pollentia	Pollenzo
Pompeii	Pompei
Portus Gruarius	Portogruaro
Portus Naonis	Pordenone
Potentia	Potenza
Praeneste	Palestrina
Puteoli	Pozzuoli
Ravenna	Ravenna
Reate	Rieti
Rhegium, Regium Lepidi	Reggio Calabria
Rodigium, Rhodigium	Rovigo
Roma	Rome
Scylacium, Scylletium, Scolatium, Scolacium, Scyllaceum, Scalacium, Minervium, Colonia Minervia	Squillace
Saena, Sena	Siena
Saudae Ulcii	Sauze d'Oulx
Savo	Savona
Segesta Tiguliorum	Sestri Levante
Segusium	Susa
Sipontum Novum, Manfredonia	Manfredonia
Spoletium	Spoleto
Stabiae	Castellammare di Stabia
Suasa	Castelleone di Suasa
Surrentum	Sorrento
Syracusae¹	Syracuse (Siracusa)
Tarentum	Taranto
Tarvisium	Treviso
Tauromenium	Taormina
Teate	Chieti
Tergeste	Trieste
Terracina	Terracina
Thermae Himerenses	Termini Imerese
Tibur	Tivoli
Ticinum	Pavia
Tifernum Tiberinum	Città di Castello
Trecalae, Caltabillocta	Caltabellotta
Tridentum	Trent (Trento)
Tuder	Todi, Umbria
Tulmentium	Tolmezzo
Tusculum	near Frascati (south-east of Rome)
Urbinum Hortense, Urvinum Hortense	near Collemancio, Umbria (?)
Urbinum Mataurense, Urvinum Mataurense	Urbino, Marche
Urticetum	Ortisei
Vada Sabatia	Vado Ligure
Casalis, Casalis Montis Ferrati	Casale Monferrato
Vedinum, Utinum	Udine
Veleia, Velleia	Velleia, frazione of Lugagnano Val d'Arda
Velitrae	Velletri
Venusia	Venosa
Vercellæ	Vercelli
Vicetia, Vincentia	Vicenza
Vigiliae	Bisceglie
Viglebanum, Vigebanum	Vigevano
Vigueria, Viguerium	Voghera
Villa Franca, Villa Franca Lunisaniae	Villafranca in Lunigiana
Vipitenum	Vipiteno
Volaterrae	Volterra
Volsinii Novi, Volsinium	Bolsena

== Cities and towns on Malta ==
Canonical Latin name (source(s): variant(s))	English name (native language(s)) – older name(s), (other language(s)), location (s)
Civitas Victoriosa	Birgu (Vittoriosa)
Melita, Notabilis	Mdina
Civitas Invicta	Isla (Senglea)
Civitas Humilissima	Valletta

== See also ==
- Chemical elements named after places (several element names employ Latin place names)
- List of Latin place names used as specific names
