= Hergates =

Ancient Ligurian people of the northern Apennines

The Hergates were a Ligurian people of the northern Apennines. They are recorded only in connection with the Roman conquest of the Ligurians, having been subdued in 175 BC together with the neighbouring Garuli and Lapicini.

== Name ==
The Hergates are named only by Livy, who lists them with the Garuli and the Lapicini among the Ligurian peoples south of the Apennine subdued by Rome in 175 BC.

The name may be compared with the Etrusco-Latin personal names Ergenna, Hercenniaes and Hergenius. According to Giulia Petracco Sicardi, the suffix -ati- seems to underly an unattested place-name *(h)ergo-. The initial h-, a sound foreign to pre-Roman Ligurian, presupposes a non-native origin.

== Geography ==
The Lapicini lived south of the northern Apennine watershed, though their precise location is unknown. On the reconstruction of Adelmo Barigazzi they held that slope together with the Garuli and the Lapicini, the Friniates lying on the northern side. He takes the terms cis Appenninum and trans Appenninum applied to these peoples to reflect the standpoint of the southern slope, on which the Roman campaign launched from the north had come to an end.

== History ==
The Hergates enter the record only at their subjugation, having been reduced by Rome in 175 BC together with the Garuli and the Lapicini. Barigazzi takes their occupation of the southern slope to belong to the period before the deportation of these peoples.
