= Celini =

Ancient Ligurian people of Cisalpine Italy

The Celini or Celines were an ancient Ligurian people of Cisalpine Italy. They are known only from the account of an attack on the Roman colony of Placentia in 200 BC, in which they joined the Ilvates and other Ligurian peoples. Their territory cannot be located, and they have sometimes been identified with the Celeiates.

== Name ==
The Celini are recorded only by Livy, who names them among the Ligurian peoples drawn into the rising of 200 BC.

The tribe is otherwise unknown. They have sometimes been identified with the Celeiates, a Ligurian people who surrendered to Rome in 197 BC. The identification was proposed by Gaetano De Sanctis, but John Briscoe regards it as uncertain.

== History ==
The Celini appear only in the rising of 200 BC. In that year the Gaulish Insubres, Cenomani and Boii, joined by the Celini, the Ilvates and other Ligurian peoples, were stirred to arms by a Carthaginian commander who had stayed in Cisalpine Gaul after the Second Punic War. They attacked and took the colony of Placentia (modern Piacenza), but the rising was eventually put down.

Insubres Cenomanique et Boii excitis Celinibus Iluatibusque et ceteris Ligustinis populis, Hamilcare Poeno duce, qui in iis locis de Hasdrubalis exercitu substiterat, Placentiam inuaserant.

The Insubres, Cenomani and Boii, with the Celini, the Ilvates and the other Ligurian peoples stirred up to join them, and under the command of the Carthaginian Hamilcar, who had stayed behind in those parts from Hasdrubal's army, invaded Placentia.

— Livy, Ab Urbe Condita 31:10:2
