= Pollentia =

Human settlement in Bra, Province of Cuneo, Piedmont, Italy

Coordinates: 44.684739°N 7.895866°E

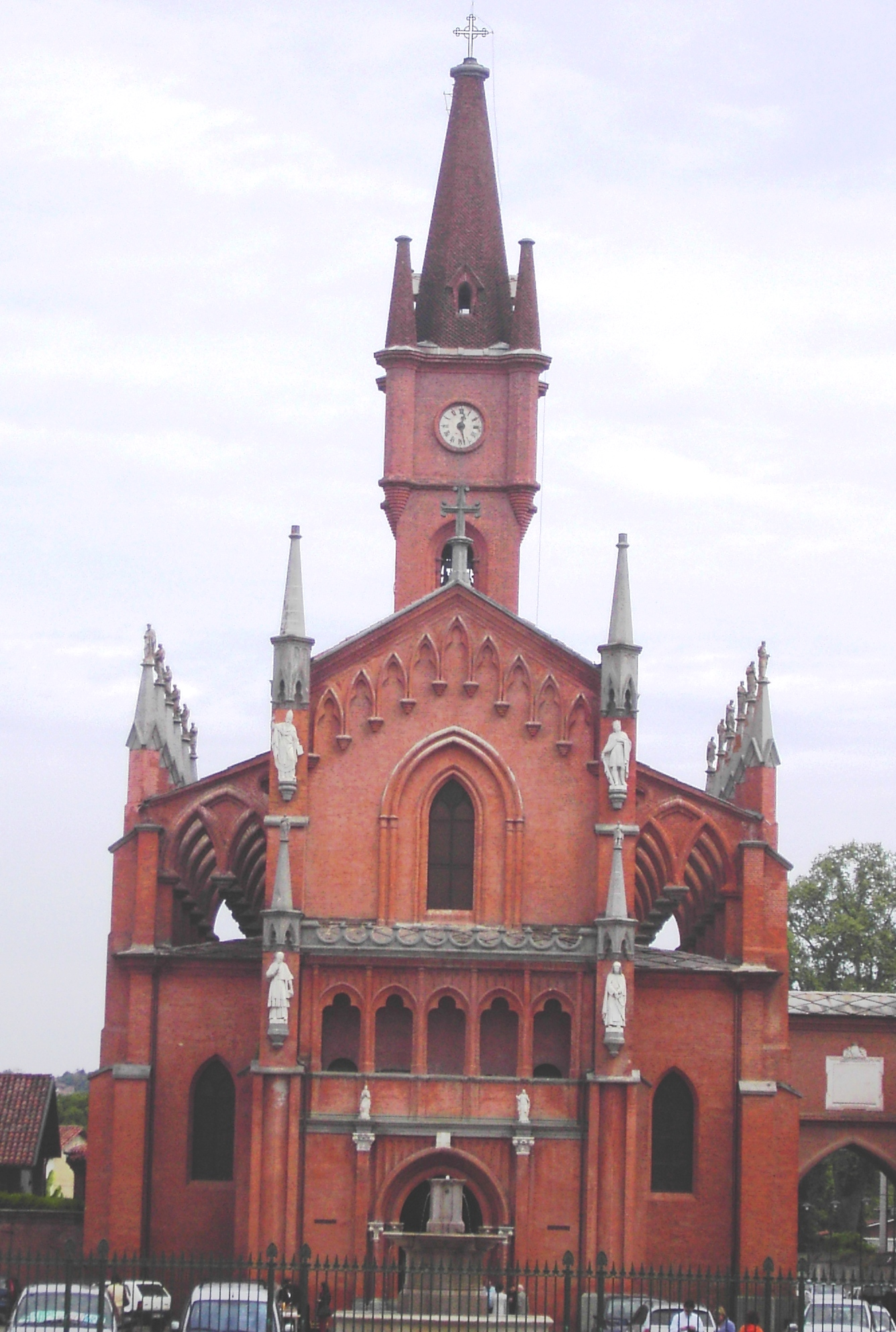
Church of San Vittore at Pollenzo.

Pollentia, known today as Pollenzo (Piedmontese: Polèns), was an ancient city on the left bank of the Tanaro. It is now a frazione (parish) of Bra in the Province of Cuneo, Piedmont, northern Italy.

In antiquity Pollentia belonged to the Ligurian Statielli, Augusta Bagiennorum (modern Roncaglia in the Comune of Bene Vagienna) being 16 km to the south. Its position on the road from Augusta Taurinorum (modern Turin) to the coast at Vada Sabatia (modern Vado Ligure, near Savona), at the point of divergence of a road to Hasta (modern Asti), gave it military importance. Decimus Brutus managed to occupy it an hour before Mark Antony in 43 BC. Here Stilicho on April 6, 402, fought the Battle of Pollentia with Alaric I, which though undecided led the Goths to evacuate Italy.

The place was famous for its brown wool and pottery. Today it is home to the University of Gastronomic Sciences which offers undergraduate, graduate and masters programs focused on gastronomy and food tourism.

According to the 1911 Encyclopædia Britannica considerable remains of ancient buildings, including an amphitheater, a theater and a temple were still in existence, although the so-called temple of Diana was more probably a tomb.
