= Veleia =

Veleia was the name of two Roman towns:

- Veleia (Italy)
- Iruña-Veleia, Álava, Basque Country, Spain
