= Benacenses =

Gallic tribe

The Benacenses were a Gallic tribe dwelling west of Lake Garda during the Roman period.

== Name ==
They are mentioned as Benacens[es] on an inscription.

The ethnic name Benacenses appears to be derived from the ancient name of Lake Garda, Lacus Benacus. The latter probably stems from an earlier *benn-āko- (cf. OIr. bennach 'pointed, horned'), built on the Gaulish stem benna- ('point, summit').

== Geography ==
The Bergalei lived on the western shore of Lake Garda (Lacus Benacus). The Barrington Atlas locates their territory west of the Sabini, Edrani and Stoeni, south of the Tublinates, and west of the Belouni.

== History ==
Around 81–96 AD, they dedicated with the Trumplini a monument to Julia Flavia, the daughter of emperor Titus, in the Roman colony of Brixia (Brescia).
