= Garuli =

Ancient Ligurian people of the northern Apennines

The Garuli were a Ligurian people of the northern Apennines. They are recorded only in connection with the Roman conquest of the Ligurians, having been subdued in 175 BC together with the neighbouring Lapicini and Hergates.

== Name ==
The Garuli are named only by Livy, who lists them with the Lapicini and the Hergates among the Ligurian peoples south of the Apennine subdued by Rome in 175 BC.

The name may be a Latin calque, given its suffix -ulo- and its proximity to the certainly calqued Lapicini. Giulia Petracco Sicardi notes, however, that Latin garrulus is always written with a geminate rr, and argues that the name could be connected to the pre-Roman river-name Garunna (the Garonne).

== Geography ==
The Garuli lived south of the northern Apennine watershed, though their precise location is unknown. On the reconstruction of Adelmo Barigazzi they held the southern slope of the northern range, together with the Lapicini and the Hergates, the Friniates lying on the northern side. He takes the terms cis Appenninum and trans Appenninum applied to these peoples to reflect the standpoint of the southern slope, on which the Roman campaign launched from the north had come to an end.

== History ==
The Garuli enter historical record only at their subjugation, having been reduced by Rome in 175 BC together with the Lapicini and the Hergates. Barigazzi takes their occupation of the southern slope to belong to the period before the deportation of these peoples.
