= Belouni =

Gallic tribe

The Belouni (Gaulish: *Belounoi, earlier *Belomnoi, 'the strong, powerful') were a Gallic tribe dwelling on the eastern shore of Lake Garda during the Roman period.

== Name ==
They are mentioned as Beloúnōn (Βελούνων; var. Βεκουνῶν, Βενουχῶν) by Ptolemy (2nd c. AD).

The ethnic name Belouni is a latinized form of the Gaulish *Belounoi, deriving from the stem belo-, meaning 'strong, powerful'.

== Geography ==
The Belouni lived on the eastern shore of Lake Garda. The Barrington Atlas locates their territory north of the Arusnates, east of the Benacenses and Stoeni, south of the Tublinates, west of the Dripsinates and Misquilenses.
