= Ilvates =

Ancient Ligurian people of Cisalpine Italy

The Ilvates (perhaps also Eleates) were a Ligurian people of Cisalpine Italy, on the northern slopes of the Apennines towards the Po, in the country between Placentia and Regium Lepidi. They are known only from Livy, who records them in arms against Rome in 200 BC, in the rising that sacked the colony of Placentia, and again in 197 BC, when they were the last people south of the Po to submit. They have frequently been identified with the Veleiates, though the identification is not certain.

== Name ==
The Ilvates are named only by Livy, in his narrative of the wars of the early 2nd century BC: among the Ligurian peoples in arms against Rome in 200 BC, and at their submission in 197 BC. The name does not recur in the geographers of the Augustan age. An otherwise unknown Eleates, recorded only in the triumphal Fasti for 158 BC, may denote either the Iluates or the Veleiates, although even its reference to the Ligurians is uncertain.

The ethnonym Ilvates is formed with the suffix -ati- on a toponymic base *ilua, which recalls the ancient name of the island of Elba (Ilua). Giulia Petracco Sicardi takes the base to be Ligurian, given the location of the finds, and notes that it has no Celtic parallel.

An identification with the Veleiates, a neighbouring Ligurian people, is frequently mentioned in scholarship, although it remains uncertain.

== Geography ==
The Ilvates dwelt on the northern slopes of the Apennines, towards the plain of the Po, between Placentia and Regium and apparently not far from Clastidium (modern Casteggio). Their precise position and extent cannot be determined. They are named together with the neighbouring Celeiates and Cerdiciates, with whom they are taken to have shared the same territory.

== History ==
In 200 BC the Ilvates were among the Ligurian peoples stirred up by the Gaulish Insubres, Cenomani and Boii in a rising under Carthaginian leadership. They joined in the sack of the Roman colony of Placentia and in the crossing of the Po to attack Cremona, but the rising was eventually put down. They are thought to have stood in close alliance with the Boii.

By 197 BC the towns of Clastidium and Litubium and the Celeiates and Cerdiciates had surrendered, leaving the Ilvates, with the Boii, as the only people south of the Po still in arms. After the consul Quintus Minucius Rufus had ravaged the Boian and Ligurian country and Clastidium had been burned, the Ilvates too submitted, on learning of the defeat of the Insubres and Boii. Their name does not appear again.
