= Maielli =

Ancient Ligurian people of north-western Italy

The Maielli (or Magelli) were an ancient Ligurian people of north-western Italy. They are known only from the list of Ligurian peoples given by Pliny the Elder, and have been placed in the basin of the Scrivia river.

== Name ==
The Maielli are named only by Pliny the Elder, in his list of the most renowned Ligurian peoples on the Italian side of the Alps, where they stand between the Binbelli and the Caburriates.

The ethnonym carries the Ligurian suffix -ello-, while its base is otherwise isolated. Alfred Holder preferred the variant reading Magelli, found in some manuscripts, tracing it to the Gaulish base *mago- 'plain, field' (as in the Gallo-Ligurian Bodincomagus) and rendering the name as 'plainsmen'. Gian Domenico Serra retained Maielli on the authority of most critical editions. Giulia Petracco Sicardi observes that the -i- could nonetheless be a phonetic development of an earlier -gi-, paralleled in Celtic and Latin (Maidunus for Magdunus), in which case Holder's derivation would still hold.

== Geography ==
Because Pliny's list runs from west to east, Serra placed the Maielli to the east of the Statielli, who were settled on the Bormida river, and of the Binbelli, on the Orba, and so probably in the basin of the Scrivia.
