= Lapicini =

Ancient Ligurian people of the northern Apennines

The Lapicini were a Ligurian people of the northern Apennines. They are recorded only in connection with the Roman conquest of the Ligurians, having been subdued in 175 BC together with the neighbouring Garuli and Hergates.

== Name ==
The Lapicini are named only by Livy, who lists them with the Garuli and the Hergates among the Ligurian peoples south of the Apennine subdued by Rome in 175 BC.

The meaning of the name is unclear. The suffix -in(o)- settles little, since it forms ethnonyms in the Gallo-Ligurian area, as in Taurini, as well as in Latino-Italic territory, as in Arretini and Praenestini. A Latin derivation is therefore possible: alongside lapis ('stone'), the attested diminutive lapicula shows the same stem lapic- that appears in the ethnonym. Giulia Petracco Sicardi suggests on this basis that Lapicini may be, like Ligures Alpini, Montani or Capillati, a Latin name translating a Ligurian ethnonym or describing the tribe by some characteristic of its own.

== Geography ==
The Lapicini lived south of the northern Apennine watershed, though their precise location is unknown. On the reconstruction of Adelmo Barigazzi they held the southern slope of the northern range, together with the Garuli and the Hergates, the Friniates lying on the northern side. He takes the terms cis Appenninum and trans Appenninum applied to these peoples to reflect the standpoint of the southern slope, on which the Roman campaign launched from the north had come to an end.

== History ==
The Lapicini enter the record only at their subjugation, having been reduced by Rome in 175 BC together with the Garuli and the Hergates. Barigazzi takes their occupation of the southern slope to belong to the period before the deportation of these peoples.
