= Veleiates =

Ancient Ligurian people of northern Italy

The Veleiates (also Eleates or Veliates) were a Ligurian people of the Apennines south of Placentia (modern Piacenza), whose principal centre was Veleia, in the area of present-day Lugagnano Val d'Arda. They are named by Pliny and in the Fasti Triumphales, which record two triumphs over them during Rome's wars against the Ligurians in the 2nd century BC.

== Name ==
Pliny lists the Veleiates amongst Ligures on the near side of the Alps. The Fasti Triumphales record the people under two further forms: as Veliates, in the triumph of Marcus Claudius Marcellus over the Ligurians in 166 BC, and as Eleates, in that of the proconsul Marcus Fulvius Nobilior in 158 BC. The forms Eleates, Veliates and Veleiates are often taken to designate the same people.

The ethnonym Veleiates is the ethnic adjective of the place name Veleia. Giulia Petracco Sicardi takes Veleia to be formed with the suffix -eio-, as in the Ligurian name Celeiates, the base uel- being either Ligurian or Etrusco-Italic.

A further identification of the Veleiates with the Ilvates, a neighbouring Ligurian people named by Livy, is frequently mentioned in scholarship, although it remains uncertain.

== Geography ==
The Veleiates occupied the Apennine valleys south of Placentia, in the hill country whose name survived in Roman Veleia. Their principal centre, Veleia, lay in the Val d'Arda and dominated it. The wider district later attached to the Roman town extended across the Taro, Trebbia and Luretta valleys. To the east, in the Apennines of the Modena and Reggio area, lay the Friniates, with whom the Veleiates were closely linked.

In Pliny's account the Veleiates stand at the boundary of two Augustan regions: they are named last, towards the east, among the Ligurians of Regio IX (Liguria), and at the western edge of Regio VIII (Aemilia).

== History ==
=== Background and relations with the Gauls ===
After the Celtic advance overturned Etruscan control of the Po plain in the early 4th century BC, the Ligurian populations of the western Aemilian Apennines recovered a degree of political autonomy. The Veleiates are thought to have kept a close alliance with the Boii, the dominant people of the Cispadana. They may also have taken part in the Second Punic War alongside the Boii. Malnati attributes to them the seizure and surrender to Hannibal of several Roman nobles after the battle of the Trebbia (218 BC), and a part in the anti-Roman risings of 205 and 203 BC.

=== Conquest by Rome ===
The Veleiates were subjugated in the course of Rome's wars against the Ligurians in the first half of the 2nd century BC. The Fasti Triumphales record a triumph over them by Marcus Claudius Marcellus in 166 BC, and a second by the proconsul Marcus Fulvius Nobilior in 158 BC. The latter is taken to have ended some eighty years of Ligurian warfare against Rome. Their revolt under Augustus in 15 BC is also recorded, after which they were placed under a prefecture for a time.

== Settlement and material culture ==
The chief settlement of the Veleiates was Veleia, a hill site dominating the Val d'Arda. The valleys of the Piacentine Apennines were linked from the early Iron Age to the Ligurian cultural sphere of southern Piedmont and show strong influence from the Golasecca culture.

The pre-Roman phase at Veleia is represented chiefly by a small group of cremation burials in stone cists, datable from about the mid-5th to the 3rd century BC. Ornaments of La Tène type, of the later 3rd to 1st century BC, attest contacts with the Gauls who had settled in the Po plain. A fragmentary statue of a bearded deity in local stone, long known as the "Ligurian Jupiter", has been interpreted as a sky god. The torc shown on it has been taken to indicate a Celtic component, or a strong Celticisation, of the tribe.

The Ligurian settlements of the Aemilian Apennine show no marked cultural change after the Roman conquest, and seem to have continued without serious disruption. The 2nd- and early-1st-century burials carry on the tradition of cremation within stone cists, increasingly using tiles. The absence of weapons from the surviving grave goods may reflect the terms of surrender imposed by Rome at the close of the Ligurian wars, dated by Malnati to 175 BC.
