= Casmonates =

Ancient Ligurian people of Cisalpine Italy

The Casmonates were an ancient Ligurian people of Cisalpine Italy, known only from a single mention by Pliny the Elder.

== Name ==
The Casmonates are attested only by Pliny the Elder, among the peoples he names as the 'most renowned Ligurians' (Ligurum celeberrimi).

The name is formed with the suffix -ati- and could presuppose a place-name *Casmona. The comparison with Latin Camena (from an earlier Casmena) and with Casmilla would point to an Etruscan origin.

== Geography ==
The Realencyclopädie (1899) placed the Casmonates on the northern slope of the Apennines, but noted that they cannot be precisely located.

Pliny mentions them between the Caburriates (in modern Cavour) and the Velleiates (near modern Lugagnano Val d'Arda).

Ligurum celeberrimi ultra Alpes Sallui, Deciates, Oxubi, citra Veneni, Turri, Soti, Bagienni, Statielli, Binbelli, Maielli, Caburriates, Casmonates, Velleiates et quorum oppida in ora proxime dicemus.

Of the Ligurians beyond the Alps the most famous are the Sallui, Deciates and Oxubi; on this side, the Veneni, Turri, Soti, Vagienni, Statielli, Binbelli, Maielli, Cuburriates, Casmonates, Velleiates, and the tribes whose towns on the coast we shall mention next.

— Pliny the Elder, Naturalis Historia 3:47
