= Cerdiciates =

Ancient Celto-Ligurian tribe

The Cerdiciates were a Celto-Ligurian tribe living south of the Po river, in the Northern Appenine, during the Iron Age and the Roman period.

== Name ==
They are mentioned as Cerdiciates by Livy (1st c. AD).

The ethnic name is formed with the suffix -ati- attached to a base *ker-dik-io-. The latter may derive from the Gaulish stem cerdo(n) ('craftsman'; cf. Old Irish cerd 'skill, art (esp. poetic art), craftsman', Middle Welsh cerdd 'skill, poetry, music').

== Geography ==
Their territory was located south of the Po river, in the Northern Appenine.

== History ==
The Cerdiciates are mentioned by Livy, who describes them as 'Ligurian'. During the war against Philip V of Macedon, the consuls Quintus Minucius Rufus and Gaius Cornelius Cethegus were assigned to Italy with two legions each to suppress revolts among Cisalpine Gauls. While Cornelius campaigned against the Insubres and Cenomani, Minucius advanced to Genoa and attacked several Ligurian communities, including the towns of Clastidium, Litubium, and the peoples of the Celeiates and Cerdiciates.

Quintus Minucius headed up the western flank of Italy to the Tyrrhenian sea and, after bringing his army to Genua, chose the Ligurians as his first adversaries in the war. Clastidium and Litubium, both Ligurian towns, and the Celeiates and the Cerdiciates, two communities of that same people, surrendered; and with that everything south of the Po was under Roman control, apart from the Gallic Boii and the Ligurian Ilvates.

— Livy, History of Rome, 32.29, transl. Loeb
