= List of Latin place names in Africa =

This list includes African countries and regions that were part of the Roman Empire, or that were given Latin place names in historical references.

== Background ==
Roman places in Africa

Until the Modern Era, Latin was the common language for scholarship and mapmaking. During the 19th and 20th centuries, German scholars in particular have made significant contributions to the study of historical place names, or Ortsnamenkunde. These studies have, in turn, contributed to the study of genealogy. For genealogists and historians of pre-Modern Europe, knowing alternate names of places is vital to extracting information from both public and private records. Even specialists in this field point out, however, that the information can be easily taken out of context, since there is a great deal of repetition of place names throughout Europe; reliance purely on apparent connections should therefore be tempered with valid historical methodology.

== Caveats and notes ==
Latin place names are not always exclusive to one place — for example, there were several Roman cities whose names began with Colonia and then a more descriptive term. During the Middle Ages, these were often shortened to just Colonia. One of these, Colonia Agrippinensis, retains the name today in the form of Cologne.

Early sources for Roman names show numerous variants and spellings of the Latin names.

The modern canonical name is listed first. Sources are listed chronologically. In general, only the earliest source is shown for each name, although many of the names are recorded in more than one of the sources. Where the source differs in spelling, or has other alternatives, these are listed following the source. As an aid to searching, variants are spelled completely, and listed in most likely chronology.

Superscripts indicate:

1. Latinized form of the Greek-derived name.
2. Latinized form of the Asian-derived name via Greek.
3. Altered Latinized form of the Greek-derived name.

== Cities and towns in Algeria ==
Canonical Latin Name (source(s): variant(s))	English name (native language(s)) - older name(s), (other language(s)), location(s)
Castellum Dimmidi	Messaad
Cuicul	Djemila
Hippo Regius or Hippone (French)	Annaba or Bône (French)
Vescera	Biskra
Cirta	Constantine
Chullu	Collo (wilaya Skikda)
Rusicade	Skikda
Milevum	Mila
Mascula	Khenchela

== Cities and towns in Libya ==
Canonical Latin Name (source(s): variant(s))	English name (native language(s)) - older name(s), (other language(s)), location(s)
Leptis Magna	ruins near Tripoli

== Cities and towns in Morocco ==
Canonical Latin Name (source(s): variant(s))	English name (native language(s)) - older name(s), (other language(s)), location(s)
ad Mercurii, Augusta Zilis, Zilis	near Asilah
Lixus	Larache
Volubilis	near Meknès
Chellah	Rabat

== Cities and towns in Tunisia ==
Canonical Latin Name (source(s): variant(s))	English name (native language(s)) - older name(s), (other language(s)), location(s)
Bulla Regia	near Jendouba
Carthago	Carthage, near Tunis
Hadrumetum	Sousse
Leptis Parva, Leptis Minor, Leptiminus	Lamta - south west of Sousse
Municipum Julium Uticense	older name: Utica - north west of Carthage, near Tunis
Mustis	El Krib
Sufetula	Sbeïtla
Thuburbo Majus	near Zagouhan
Thysdrus	El Jem

== See also ==
- Chemical elements named after places (several element names employ Latin place names)
- List of Latin place names used as specific names
