= Veneni =

Ligurian tribe

The Veneni were a Ligurian tribe dwelling in the Varaita Valley during the Iron Age and the Roman period.

== Name ==
They are mentioned as Veneni by Pliny (1st c. AD).

The ethnic name Veneni has been compared with the Indo-European stem uen- ('clan, family'). This interpretation depends on phonetic details that cannot be securely established, such as the quantity of the second -e-. According to Jean Loicq, if the name should be read instead as Venenni, by analogy with the neighbouring Vagienni listed by Pliny, the formation could be "palaeo-Ligurian".

== Geography ==
Their territory has been identified with the Varaita Valley, a right-bank tributary of the Po river in Piedmont, slightly south of Cuneo.
