= Celeiates =

Ancient Ligurian people of Cisalpine Italy

The Celeiates were an ancient Ligurian people of Cisalpine Italy, settled in the Apennine hinterland of the present-day Oltrepò Pavese, south of the Po. They are known almost only from the account of their surrender to Rome in 197 BC, together with the neighbouring Cerdiciates. Both their relation to the town of Clastidium (modern Casteggio) and their possible identity with the Celini have been questioned.

== Name ==
The Celeiates are recorded only by Livy, in his account of the Roman campaign of 197 BC against the Ligurians. He reports that two towns, Clastidium and Litubium, and two communities (civitates) belonging to the same Ligurian people, the Celeiates and the Cerdiciates, surrendered to the consul Quintus Minucius.

This is the only secure mention of the people. They have sometimes been connected with the Celini, a Ligurian group recorded in connection with an attack on Placentia in 200 BC. The identification was originally proposed by Gaetano De Sanctis, but John Briscoe regards it as uncertain.

The ethnonym is formed with the suffix -ati- on a place-name *keleia, homonymous with Celeia in Noricum (modern Celje). Giulia Petracco Sicardi traces it to a root *kel- (perhaps Indo-European *kʷel-), comparing the Gaulish celicnon ('tower, raised hall'). She takes the Celeiates to be probably the same people as the Celines, whose name is formed instead with a suffix -in-.

== Geography ==
The Celeiates are placed in the valleys of the Apennine hinterland behind Clastidium (modern Casteggio), in the present-day Oltrepò Pavese. They are named together with the Cerdiciates and the Ilvates, which has been taken to indicate that the three peoples occupied the same district. Their setting belongs to a wider "Ligurian-Apennine" world spanning both slopes of the northern Apennines, from the coastal hinterland to the southern edge of the Po plain.

Oppida Clastidium et Litubium, utraque Ligurum, et duae gentis eiusdem ciuitates Celeiates Cerdiciatesque sese dediderunt; et iam omnia cis Padum praeter Gallorum Boios, Iluates Ligurum sub dicione erant.

The towns of Clastidium and Litubium, both Ligurian, and two communities of the same people, the Celeiates and Cerdiciates, surrendered; and by now everything south of the Po had come under Roman control, except, among the Gauls, the Boii, and among the Ligurians, the Ilvates.

— Livy, Ab Urbe Condita 32:29:7

The relation between the people and the towns named beside them is read in different ways. Stéphane Bourdin treats Clastidium as the oppidum of the Celeiates, and Litubium as that of the Cerdiciates. Elvira Migliario, by contrast, holds that the two civitates were communities distinct from the two towns, settled in the inner valleys behind them.

== History ==
The only recorded episode in the history of the Celeiates is their submission to Rome in 197 BC. In that year the consul Quintus Minucius led his army to Genua and opened a campaign against the Ligurians, in the course of which the Celeiates and Cerdiciates, with the towns of Clastidium and Litubium, surrendered to him. Fifteen towns and some twenty thousand people gave themselves up during the operations. The campaign left only the Boii and the Ilvates unsubdued south of the Po.
