= Soti (tribe) =

Ligurian tribe

The Soti were an ancient Ligurian tribe.

== Name ==
They are mentioned as Soti by Pliny (1st c. AD).

F. Rubat Borel has proposed to emend Soti to Sotani (based on a confusion of -an- with -iu- by copyists), and identify them with the Stoeni, a tribe from Lake Como.

The name may also be compared with the vinum Sotanum, cultivated in the territory of Vienna (modern Vienne), the capital of the Allobroges. Giulia Petracco Sicardi has also compared it with the Aquitanian ethnonym Sotiates.

== Geography ==
They are listed among the "Ligurians beyond the Alps" (Ligurum celeberrimi ultra Alpes) by Pliny.
