= Bagienni =

Ancient Ligurian people of north-western Italy

The Bagienni (also Vagienni) were an ancient Ligurian or Celto-Ligurian people of north-western Italy, in the south-west of present-day Piedmont. Counted among the peoples remembered for the wars they waged against Rome in the 2nd century BC, they were in time absorbed into Roman Italy, and their name was preserved by the Roman town of Augusta Bagiennorum (modern Bene Vagienna).

== Name ==
They are listed as Bagienni by Pliny the Elder, who counts them among the most notable Ligurians on the Italian side of the Alps, and elsewhere calls them Bagienni Ligures. They are also named by Varro, by Velleius Paterculus, and by Silius Italicus, as well as in local Latin inscriptions.

Many modern editions print the form Vagienni, but this rests on editorial choices rather than on the best evidence. The local inscriptions give the name with an initial b (Bagienni) without exception, as do the manuscripts of Varro and Velleius Paterculus. The Vagenni of Silius Italicus is a conjecture by Nicolaas Heinsius against manuscripts reading Bag-, while the v-readings in Pliny rest mainly on a single 9th-century manuscript, perhaps by attraction to the preceding m of Ligurum. On this basis Theodor Mommsen held Bagienni, with b, to be the correct form, Vagienni being a corruption. The modern comune of Bene Vagienna took that name only in 1862. The doubled element reproduces the corrupt v-form found in some editions of Pliny.

The name is of Celtic formation, from a Gaulish word *bagos, generally taken to mean 'beech' and continuing the Indo-European word for that tree (*bʰāgós; compare Latin fagus and Greek phēgós). The stem also occurs in a group of theonyms and personal names of southern Gaul (Baginus, Iuppiter Baginatis, the Matres Baginatae). Several Piedmontese place names continue the ethnonym, among them Bene (Bene Vagienna), Augusta Bagiennorum, Beinette and Benna.

== Ethnic identity ==
In the ancient sources the Bagienni are classed as Ligurians. Those same authors, following Cato, treating the Ligurians as the population of Cisalpine Italy that preceded the arrival of the Celts. The Celtic form of their name is one mark of the close contact between the two. The Bagienni may therefore be described as 'Celto-Ligures' or Celticised Ligures.

== Geography ==
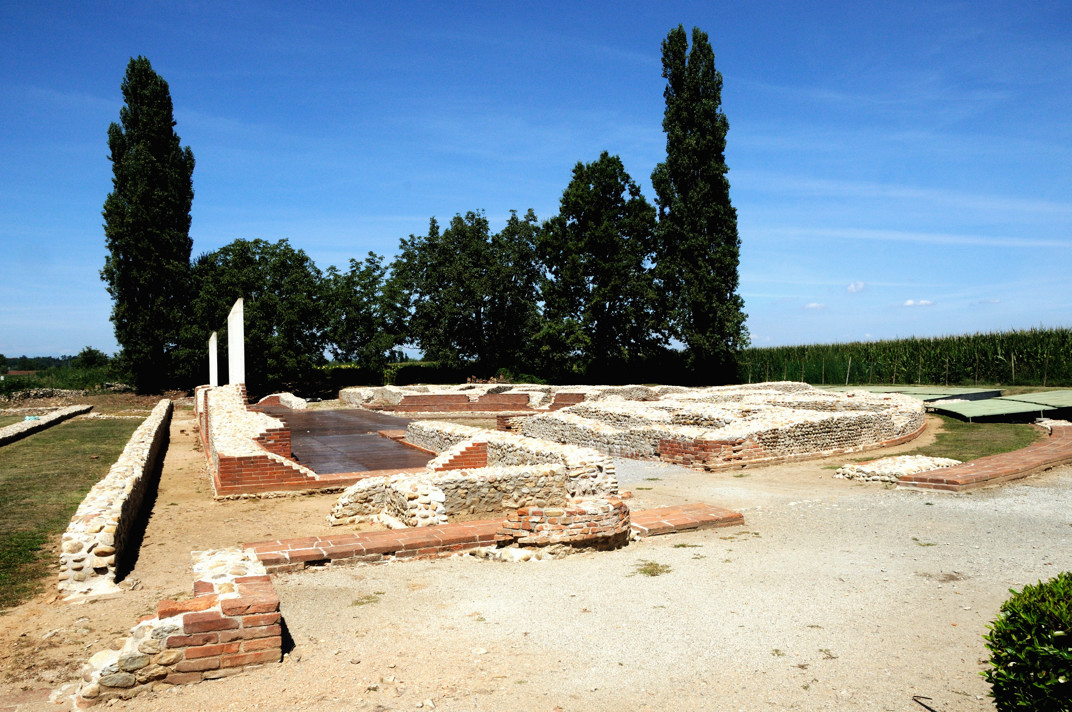
Remains of Augusta Bagiennorum.

The Bagienni occupied the south-west of present-day Piedmont, in the modern Province of Cuneo, extending from the Monviso to the hills of the Langhe along the upper course of the Tanaro. To the north were the Taurini, around the later Augusta Taurinorum (Turin), whom the same sources also reckon Ligurian. To the east lay the Statielli and the other peoples whom Pliny groups among the most notable Ligurians of Cisalpine Italy.

A pagus Bagiennus is also attested in the Apennine territory of Veleia, south of Piacenza, well to the east of the main territory. Whether it points to a related or displaced group or merely to the spread of the same onomastic element is unclear. A further difficulty is posed by Velleius Paterculus, who places the colony of Eporedia (modern Ivrea, founded in 100 BC) in Bagiennis, although Eporedia lay in the land of the Salassi, far to the north. This has been explained either as a corruption of the text or by supposing a homonymous Bagiennian district among the Salassi.

== History ==
Pliny counts the Bagienni among the Ligures celeberrimi ('famous Ligurians'), the inland Ligurian peoples remembered for the hard wars they gave Rome in the course of the 2nd century BC. Like their neighbours they were progressively brought under Roman control and absorbed into Roman Italy.

The chief Roman settlement of the area, Augusta Bagiennorum at the modern Bene Vagienna on the upper Tanaro, preserved the people's name in its own, alongside the imperial title Augusta; whether it was preceded by a settlement of the pre-Roman period on the same site is uncertain.
