= Augusta Bagiennorum =

Ligurian town

Coordinates: 44.559186°N 7.854843°E

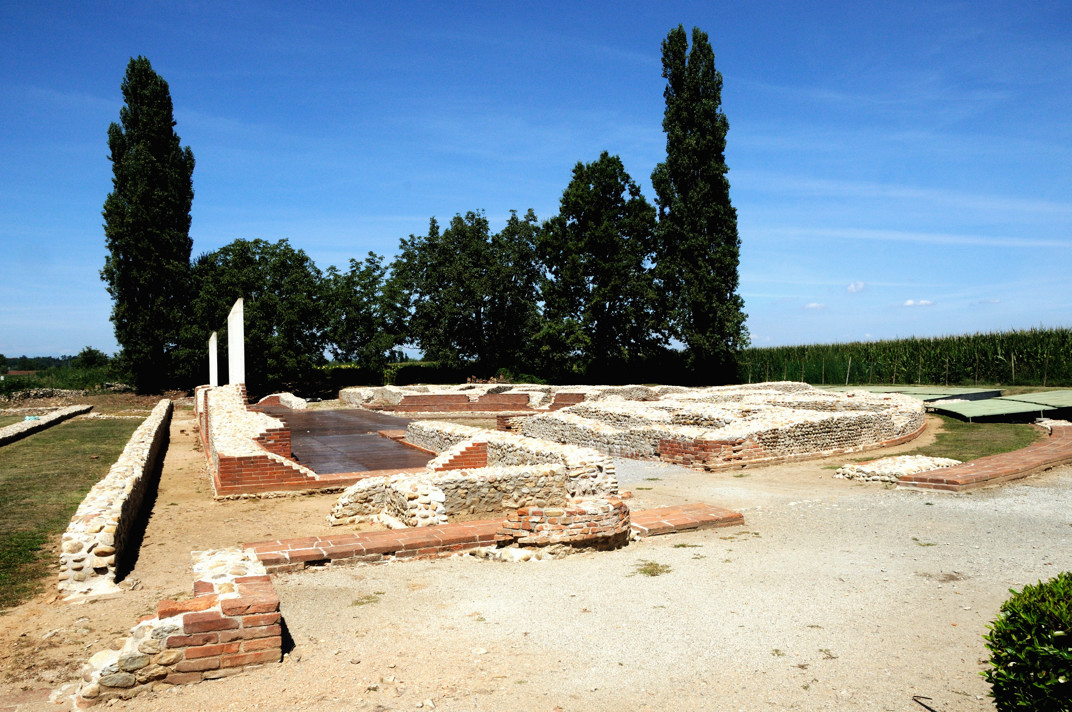
Remains of Augusta Bagiennorum.

Augusta Bagiennorum was the chief town of the Ligurian tribe of the Bagienni. It was located in what is now the commune of Bene Vagienna, in the province of Cuneo (northern Italy), on the upper course of the Tanaro, about 35 miles (56 km) due south of Turin. The town retained its position as a tribal centre in the reorganization of Roman Emperor Octavian, whose title Augustus is part of its name as a colony, and was erected on a systematic plan.

Considerable remains of public buildings, constructed in concrete faced with small stones with bands of brick at intervals, an amphitheatre with a major axis of c. 120 m and a minor axis of c. 900 m, a theatre with a stage 40 m in length, and near it the foundations of what was probably a basilica, an open space (no doubt the forum), an aqueduct, baths, have been discovered by recent excavations, and also one of the city gates, flanked by two towers.

The ancient name is also used for a modern natural reserve.
