= List of Latin place names used as specific names =

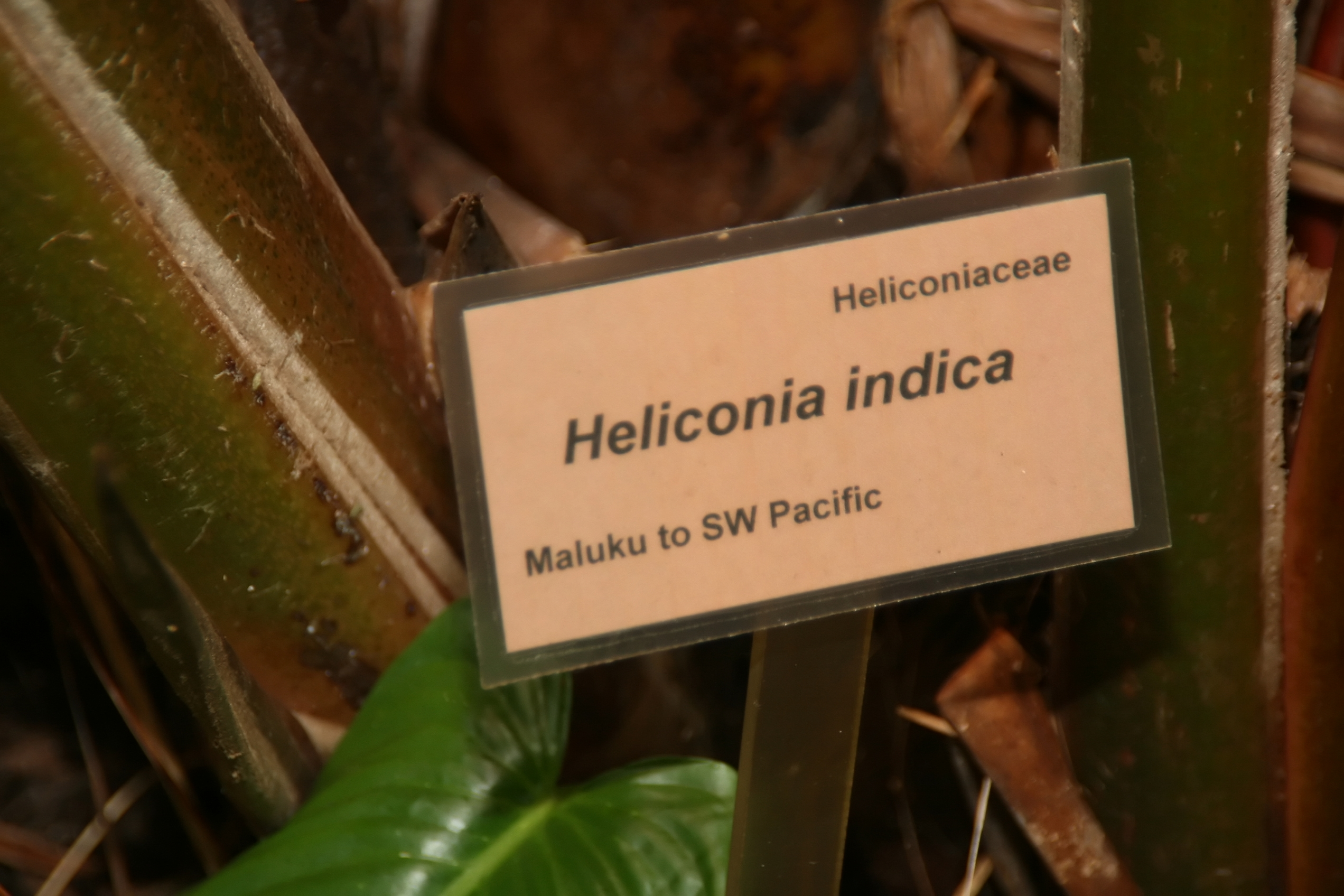
The name Heliconia indica invokes two locations: Heliconia refers to Mount Helicon, and indica means 'from India'.

A list of place names, used in Latin descriptions and, after the development of binomial nomenclature, as specific names in the natural sciences.

== A ==
- abancayense Abancay, Peru
- abitaguense Cerros de Abitagua, Ecuador
- abyssinica Abyssinia
- acadiensis northeastern North America
- adoensis Aden, Arabia
- aegyptiacum Egypt
- aegyptius Egypt
- aethiopicum Ethiopia
- agavacense Agavaca province, Peru
- ajuscoense Ajusco, Mexico
- alaica Alai Mountains, Kyrgyzstan and Tajikistan
- albarracinensis Albarracín in Spain
- aldabrense Aldabra
- albionicus Great Britain
- amatymbica of the Thembu people of Kaffraria
- amazonium Amazonia
- amboniensis Ambon Island
- amurensis Amur River
- andohahelensis Andohahela, southeast Madagascar
- anglicus England
- angolensis Angola
- arabicum Arabia
- ardjunensis Ardjuna, Sumatra
- arvensis "of the fields"
- ascalonicum Ashkelon
- atlantica Atlas Mountains
- australis Southern Hemisphere, Southern
- ayacuchense Ayacucho, Perú
- ayavacense Havana

== B ==
- barbadensis Barbados
- batangense Batang, China
- berolinensis Berlin
- bonariensis Buenos Aires, Argentina
- bononiensis Bologna
- borealis Northern Hemisphere, Northern
- brasiliensis Brazil
- britannicus Great Britain
- bruscellensis Brussels
- bruxellensis Brussels
- butuoense Butuo, Sichuan, China

== C ==
- cairica Cairo
- californianus California
- californica California
- californicus California
- californiensis California
- californius California
- camaldulensis Camaldoli monastery near Naples
- canariensis Canary Islands
- canedana, canadensis Canada
- capensis Cape Colony
- cathayana Cathay (modern China)
- cazorlense Cazorla, Spain
- chalepensis Aleppo
- chamaense Chama River (Venezuela)
- chaparense Chapare, Bolivia
- chilensis Chile
- chilloense Chillo, Ecuador
- colchichus Colchis (modern Georgia)
- coreanus Korea
- coreensis Korea
- cretensis Crete

== D ==
- dumetorum, "of the thickets"

== E ==
- elesitaiensis Elesitai
- elymaitica Elymais
- eystettensis Eichstätt

== F ==
- fennicus Finland
- formosanus Taiwan
- fresnensis Fresno, California

== G ==
- gandavensis Ghent
- groenlandicus Greenland

== H ==
- hafniensis Copenhagen
- halepensis Aleppo
- helvetica Switzerland
- hibernicus Ireland
- hortensis "of the garden"
- hyperboreus Arctic region

== I ==
- israelense Israel
- israelensis Israel
- israelica Israel
- israeliensis Israel
- israeliticum Israel

== J ==
- japonensis Japan
- japonicus Japan

== K ==
- kentuckiensis Kentucky

== L ==
- lapponicus Lapland/Sápmi
- leydenensis Leyden
- londinensis London
- lugdunum Lyon
- lutetiana Paris
- lutetianus Paris

== M ==
- madagascariensis Madagascar
- maigualidae – Sierra de Maigualida, Venezuela
- malabaricus Malabar
- mauretanicus Maghreb
- mexicana Mexico
- monspessulanus Montpellier
- monspeliensis Montpellier

== N ==
- neblinensis, Cerro de la Neblina or Sierra de la Neblina, Brazil–Venezuela border
- nippon, nipponensis Japan
- norvegicus Norway
- novaeangliae New England
- novaehollandiae Australia
- novaeseelandiae New Zealand
- noveboracensis New York
- novoguineensis New Guinea
- novomexicanum New Mexico

== O ==
- oelandica Öland

== P ==
- parisiense Paris
- philippinensis Philippines
- ponticus Pontus
- pratensis "of the meadow"

== R ==
- rossicus Russia

== S ==
- sarawakensis Sarawak
- schoenbrunnensis Schönbrunn Palace
- septentrionalis Northern
- shangyuanensis Shangyuan, China
- sinensis China
- sinicum China
- sitkensis Sitka, Alaska, USA
- surattensis India, Surat

== T ==
- tatarica Tatarstan and environs
- terraenovae Newfoundland
- texana Texas
- texanum Texas
- texanus Texas
- texasanus Texas
- texasianum Texas
- texasianus Texas
- texasiensis Texas
- texense Texas
- texensis Texas
- thenensis Tienen
- tianschanica Tian Shan mountain range
- turcicus Turkey
- turolensis Diocese of Teruel in Spain

== V ==
- valdiviense, valdiviana – Valdivia
- vallegrandense Vallegrande, Bolivia
- vansittartense Vansittart Island, Tasmania
- varsoviensis Warsaw
- venezuelicum Venezuela
- villaricense Villarica, Cotabato, Philippines
- vindobonensis Vienna
- virginiana Virginia
- virginianum Virginia
- virginicum Virginia
- vitiense Viti = Fiji
- vitocense Vitoca, Peru

== W ==
- wulatensis Wulatehouqi, Mongolia

== Y ==
- yamobambense Yamobamba, Peru
- yanamonense
- yangambiense
- yapacaniense
- yirrkalensis
- yolense
- yungasense
- yucatanum

== Z ==
- zamorense
- zanzibarense
- zeylanica Ceylon
- zudanense
- zumbense
- zuurbergensis Zuurberg Mountains

== See also ==
- List of Latin and Greek words commonly used in systematic names
- List of Latin place names in Africa
