= Stoeni =

Ligurian tribe

The Stoeni (also Stoni or Styni) were a Ligurian tribe living near Lake Garda during the Iron Age.

== Name ==
They are mentioned as Styni by Livy (late 1st c. BC), as Stoni by Strabo (early 1st c. AD), and as Stoeni by Pliny (1st c. AD) and on the Fasti Triumphales Capitolini (early 2nd c. BC).

On the Fasti Triumphales Capitolini (117 BC), they are described as Ligurian Stoeni, whereas Orosius designates them as Gauls.

F. Rubat Borel has proposed to identify them with the Soti (which he emends to Sotani) mentioned by Pliny. According to him, this would place them within a series of wars fought in the Rhône valley and the western Alps beginning in 123 BC.

== Geography ==
The Stoeni lived in the Sarca valley, a tributary of Lake Garda (east of modern Milan).

Their chief town was Stouinos, mentioned around 100 BC by Artemidorus (cited by Stephanus of Byzantium).

== History ==
They were defeated by the Roman forces led by Q. Marcius Rex (consul in 118 BC), who celebrated a triumph for it in 117 BC. The sources do not explain the reasons for the campaign, which appears to have been a punitive expedition, likely in response to raids into the lowlands near Brixia or Verona. The delayed triumph in 117 BC suggests prolonged operations, although Orosius claims there were no battles, as the Stoeni allegedly committed mass suicide with their wives and children when surrounded. Scholar Cesare Letta notes that the campaign was not intended to secure control of the Resia Pass.
