= Veleia (Italy) =

Coordinates: 44.785131°N 9.722596°E

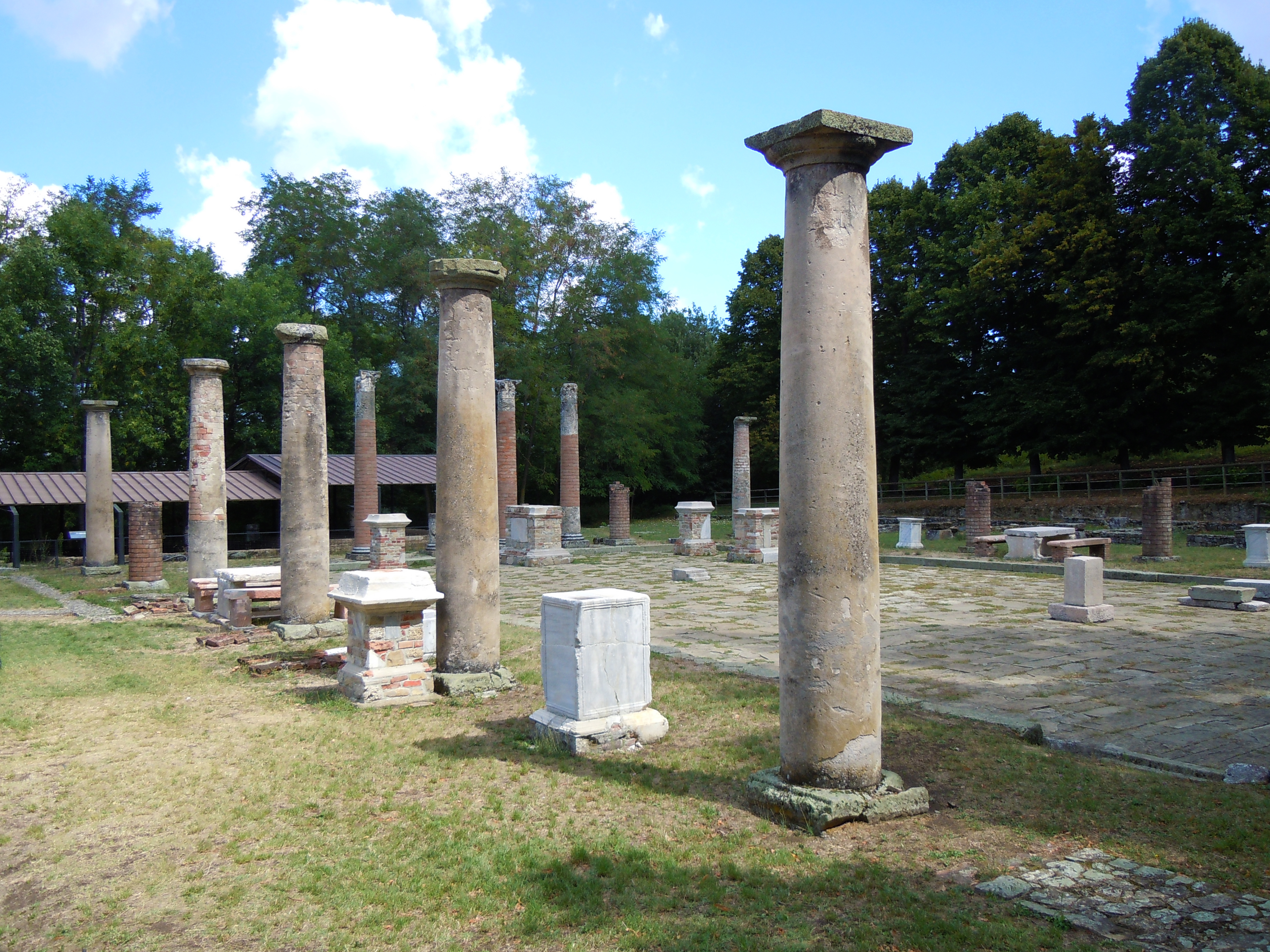
Archeological area and Antiquarium of Veleia - MIBAC

Veleia is an ancient town of Aemilia, Italy, about 15 km (9 mi) south of Placentia. It is mentioned by Pliny among the towns of the eighth region, though the Veleiates were ethnically Ligurians. Its inhabitants were, in the census of Vespasian, found to be remarkable for their longevity. Nothing further was known of it until 1747, when some ploughmen found the Tabula alimentaria, now in National Archaeological Museum of Parma. This, the largest inscribed bronze tablet of antiquity (1.3 m by 2.8 m) contains the list of estates in the territories of Veleia, Libarna, Placentia, Parma and Luca, in which Trajan had assigned before 102 CE 72,000 sesterces and then 1,044,000 sesterces on a mortgage bond to forty-six estates. The total value of which was reckoned at over 13,000,000 sesterces (~130,000), the interest on which at 5% was to serve for the support of 266 boys and 6 girls, the former receiving 16, the latter 12 sesterces a month.

Excavations begun on the site in 1760, and were at first successful; the forum and basilica, the thermae and the amphitheatre and private houses with many statues (twelve of marble from the basilica, and a fine bronze head of Hadrian) and inscriptions were discovered. Pre-Roman cremation tombs have also been found, with objects of bronze and iron. But later excavations which were carried on at intervals up to 1876 have given less fruitful results. The oldest dated monument is a bronze tablet with a portion of the text of the Lex Rubria de Gallia cisalpina of 49 BCE which dealt with the administration of justice in Cisalpine Gaul in connection with the extension to it of the privileges of the Roman franchise, the latest an inscription of 276 CE. Most of the objects found are in the museum at Parma.

How and when Veleia was abandoned is uncertain: the previously prevalent view that it was destroyed by a landslip was proved to be mistaken by the excavations of 1876.
