= Friniates =

Ancient Ligurian people of the northern Apennines

The Friniates (or Friniates Ligures, probably also Briniates) were an ancient Ligurian people of the northern Apennines, in the upland country later known as the Frignano (in the modern province of Modena). They are recorded only by Livy, in his account of the Roman wars against the Ligurians in the early 2nd century BC, when they twice took up arms against Rome. After a first defeat in 187 BC, when part of the people was brought down from the mountains into the plain, they rose again in the 170s and seized the colony of Mutina, before being finally subdued by Rome in 175 BC.

== Name ==
The Friniates are recorded only by Livy, who names them in his account of the Ligurian wars of the early 2nd century BC. In the narrative of the 175 BC campaign, which survives only in the Vienna manuscript, the name appears instead as Briniates, emended by most editors to Friniates and taken as a corruption of the same name. An older view, going back to Philipp Clüver, instead kept the two apart and located the Briniates in the valley of the Vara, to the west.

The ethnonym is built with the suffix -ati- attached to an underlying place-name *frinio-, of uncertain etymology. Although the suffix frequent in both Celtic and Ligurian names, Bernard Mees argues that the name can hardly be regarded as a genuine Celtic form. Giulia Petracco Sicardi offers two explanations of the pair. On one account Briniates and Friniates are phonetic variants of a single name, with b- the Ligurian reflex and f- the Italic, Latin or Etruscan one. On the other, Friniates is the Ligurian adaptation of a name that was originally Etruscan.

The name Friniates is usually held to survive in that of the Frignano, the mountainous part of the province of Modena. (Note: Barigazzi noted the derivation of the place-name Frignano from Feronianum, from the goddess Feronia, and raised, tentatively, the possibility of an unattested ethnonym *Feroniates lying behind Friniates.) Giulio Ciampoltrini and Paolo Notini have connected it instead with Monte Frino (also Frignone), a height in the Garfagnana on the southern side of the range, suggesting that an ancient name of the mountain supplied the name of the community that settled there from the 4th century BC.

== Geography ==
Reconstruction of the territory of the Friniates rests almost entirely on the surviving narrative, which is topographically imprecise and applies the terms cis and trans Appenninum ('this side of' and 'across' the Apennines) without a fixed point of reference. On John Briscoe's reading these terms are to be understood from the standpoint of the Roman army on each occasion rather than relative to Rome, which allows the tribe to be placed north of the Apennine watershed.

According to Adelmo Barigazzi, their territory comprised the basins of the Scoltenna (the upper course of the Panaro) and the Secchia, running along the main ridge from the Corno alle Scale in the east to the Passo del Cerreto in the west, with the Passo delle Radici between them. This is the upland later known as the Frignano. To the south and south-west were the Apuani, in the Garfagnana, the Magra valley and the Apuan Alps. To the north, in the valley of the Po, lay the Boi and the Roman colonies planted on former Boian land at Bononia and Mutina.

Whether the Friniates were confined to the northern slope or also held ground to the south remains unresolved. The removal of part of the people as transmontani ('those across the mountains') in 187 BC has been taken by Ciampoltrini and Notini as indirect evidence that they were settled on both sides of the range. The same authors have further argued that the Ligurian sites of the upper Serchio valley, in the Garfagnana, long assigned to the Apuani, may rather have belonged to the Friniates, and that the river Audena, named as a boundary of the trans-Appennine Friniates in 176 BC, denotes the upper course of the Serchio. The Audena is otherwise unknown. Barigazzi had instead identified it with the Secchia, the western limit of the Frignano.

The Ligurian settlements of the upper Serchio, excavated from the 1980s onward (among them Monte Pisone, near San Romano in Garfagnana), belong to the formation of Ligurian culture in the area in the 4th and 3rd centuries BC. They are conventionally described as belonging to the Apuani, and heir attribution to the Friniates remains unclear.

== History ==
The Friniates were one of the Ligurian peoples of the northern Apennines whom Rome confronted in the decades after the Second Punic War, as it extended its hold over the southern Po plain and the neighbouring Boi. Driven by the poor life in their mountains, the Friniates raided the lowlands of the plain to the north, while their southern neighbours the Apuani descended toward the Tyrrhenian coast and Pisae.

=== War of 187 BC ===
In 187 BC the consuls Gaius Flaminius and Marcus Aemilius Lepidus were assigned the Ligurian command. Flaminius attacked the Friniates in their own territory, defeated them in several engagements, and ordered them to surrender their arms. When they refused and withdrew to a mountain called the mons Auginus, (Note: The mons Auginus has been identified tentatively with Monte Cimone, the highest summit of the northern Apennines. It lay within the territory of the Friniates and is to be distinguished from the unnamed ancestral mountain of the Apuani, with which it has at times been confused.) he pursued them, but their command of the ground allowed most to escape across the Apennines, where they later surrendered and were thoroughly disarmed. He then turned against the Apuani, who had raided the territories of Pisae and Bononia, and afterwards built a road from Bononia to Arretium.

Lepidus, operating against other Ligurian communities, defeated those on the southern side of the range and then crossed to the valley of the Po, where he dealt with a body of Friniates that Flaminius had failed to pursue and brought the defeated down from the mountains into the plain. He marked the campaign by laying out the Via Aemilia from Placentia to Ariminum. This transfer was a removal to the neighbouring lowland, not the long-distance deportation to Samnium imposed on the Apuani in 180 and 179 BC.

=== Revolt and subjugation (177–175 BC) ===
The Friniates remained quiet for about a decade, then reorganised and resumed their raids into the plain, in a revolt that seems to have been concerted with the Apuani. In 177 BC, with the Roman armies engaged in Istria, they took the offensive. The consul Gaius Claudius Pulcher transferred his forces from Istria and defeated them in a pitched battle on the Scoltenna, between Mutina and Vignola, with heavy losses. Learning soon afterwards that the legion stationed at Pisae had been disbanded, they came down once more, ravaged the territory of Mutina, and took the colony itself by surprise.

Claudius recovered Mutina in 176 BC after a short siege. The suppression of the revolt was entrusted to the consuls Quintus Petillius and Gaius Valerius, who pressed the enemy back to the mountains of Ballista and Letum, where Petillius was killed in the fighting. The war was completed in 175 BC by the consul Marcus Aemilius Lepidus, who crossed the Apennines, drew in the Apuani as well, and forced the remaining communities to surrender and give up their arms. (Note: Barigazzi argued that the subject of the relevant passage is Lepidus rather than his colleague Publius Mucius Scaevola, to whom the final operation is sometimes assigned.) At its close three otherwise unknown peoples, the Garuli, Lapicini and Hergates, are recorded on the near side of the range and the Briniates (that is, the Friniates) on the far side, by the river Audena. Whether this amounted to a further mass deportation, like that of the Apuani, or to no more than a removal down into the plain, is disputed. Barigazzi argued for a deportation to a distant land, whereas Briscoe takes it as merely a move into the lowlands.

After 175 BC the south-eastern Ligurians, Friniates and Apuani alike, were effectively subdued, and the Friniates are not heard of again.
