= Ligures =

Ancient ethnic group from north-western Italy and south-eastern Gaul before 4th c BC

The peoples of Iron Age Italy before 4th c BC. The Ligures occupied the north-western corner (green).

The Ligures or Ligurians (Latin: Ligures, singular Ligus or Ligur; Ancient Greek: Λίγυες, romanized: Lígues) were an ancient people of the north-western Mediterranean, centred on north-western Italy and extending along the neighbouring coast of south-eastern Gaul. Their name was among the oldest mentioned by ancient writers, being attested from the archaic Greek geographers down to the Roman conquest.

In a narrow sense, the name belonged to a population of north-western Italy, where a distinctive material culture is recognisable from the Bronze Age. The chief markers of Ligurian identity here were an indigenous cremation rite and distinctively non-Celtic onomastics. (Note: The onomastic material is described as non-Celtic because it lacks some defining innovations of Celtic, such as the loss of Proto-Indo-European *p: the river name Porcobera keeps the initial *p of *porko- ('fish' or 'salmon'), whereas Celtic loses it, as in Old Irish orc. Even scholars who connect Ligurian with Celtic therefore regard Ligurian as an archaic form of Celtic or as a para-Celtic language rather than Celtic proper.) Another ancient tradition, going back to the 6th century BC, applied the name Ligyes to a much broader and largely unknown area inhabited by 'barbarians' in the far west. The earliest Greek geographers placed them at the edge of the known world, in a semi-mythical setting similar to that of the Ethiopians and Scythians. Such descriptions covered a shifting, ill-defined area and their ethnic value is much debated by modern scholars, since several of the peoples they reckoned Ligurian, especially in southern Gaul, bore unmistakably Celtic names.

The ancient Ligures are usually held to descend from the Bronze Age population of north-western Italy, though a self-aware people organised on a tribal basis probably took shape only in the Iron Age, under Etruscan and Greek stimulus. From the 7th century BC, contact with the Etruscans and Greeks, focused on the trading post (emporium) of Genoa, drew them into Mediterranean trade and offered some Ligures an outlet in mercenary service. The Ligurian economy was a poor one, resting on herding, subsistence agriculture and the exploitation of woodland, and they resorted to raiding and piracy at times when economic conditions worsened. Their language is known only at second hand, almost entirely from names. Although modern linguists classify it as an Indo-European language, its place within the language, above all whether it forms a branch close to Celtic, remains unresolved.

The Ligures are remembered above all for their protracted resistance to Rome. Holding a rugged frontier where the Alps merge into the Apennines, they fought by raid and ambush rather than in pitched battle. The wars of the early 2nd century BC ended in their subjugation, marked by the deportation of some 40,000 Apuani to Samnium in 180 BC. Under Augustus the name Liguria was given a fixed administrative sense as the ninth region of Roman Italy. The ancient Ligures had a long afterlife in the historiography of the region, where from the 18th century a tradition of ligurismo asserted an unbroken descent of the modern inhabitants of Liguria from the ancient Ligures, whose name survives in the current name of the region and in the Ligurian Sea.

== Name ==
=== Attestations ===
The people are named in Greek as Λίγυες (Lígyes, singular Λίγυς Lígys). In Latin the more common form is Ligus (plural Ligures) rather than Ligur. The oblique stem (genitive Liguris) and derivatives such as Liguria show that the Latin name is not derived from the Greek one. The adjective Ligustinus occurs mainly in Latin authors who draw on Greek sources. The country they were held to occupy was called Λιγυστική (Ligystikḗ) in Greek and Liguria in Latin.

The Greek form is the older and is attested from the archaic period. Hesiod is possibly the first to use it in a verse quoted by Strabo, although the reading is disputed. (Note: The verse survives only as a quotation in Strabo (Geographica, 7:3:7), where the Ligyes appear as one of three peoples of the inhabited world beside the Ethiopians and Scythians. Its standing as the earliest mention of the Ligures depends on reading Λίγυες rather than the variant Λίβυες ("Libyans"). The reading Λίγυες, along with the attribution of the passage to Hesiod, are disputed.) The name is attested in Hecataeus of Miletus (late 6th century BC), Herodotus (5th century BC), and Pseudo-Scylax (4th century BC), and remained in use in the later geographic tradition down to Strabo (early first century AD) and Ptolemy (2nd century AD). In Latin, Ligures is the standard form throughout the Roman historical and geographic tradition, used among others by Livy (1st century BC) in his account of the wars against them and by Pliny the Elder (1st century AD) in his Natural History.

=== Etymology ===
The Greek form Lígyes has been explained as the foreign rendering of a name actually borne by an indigenous people, reshaped to coincide with the homonymous Greek adjective ligýs, which described a shrill or piercing voice and was probably itself onomatopoeic, on the model of bárbaros. On this reading the Ligyes were 'the shrill ones' or 'the screechers', seen as a nickname rather than a self-designation. The 'screeching' sense would therefore be a Greek reinterpretation, and the form and meaning of the indigenous name underlying it cannot be recovered. Whether that name, and the wider onomastic record of the region, are Celtic or belong to an older stratum is debated.

=== Self-designation ===
The Ligures are reported to have used Ambrones (Ἄμβρωνες) as an ancestral endonym (self-designation). The tradition derives from Plutarch's account of the Battle of Aquae Sextiae (102 BC), where the Ligurian auxiliaries in the army of Gaius Marius are said to have answered the war-cry "Ambrones!" raised by the migrating Ambrones opposite them, taking it up as a name they applied to themselves "by descent". The only other possible trace is a corrupt name in Suetonius's account of the conspiracy of 65 BC, transmitted in the manuscripts as Lambrani, in the phrase per Lambranos et Transpadanos. Some scholars emend it to Ambrones and connect it with the Ligures and other Cispadane peoples, but both the reading and the identification are insecure.

The notice is isolated and its value disputed. Dominique Briquel related the name to an old Indo-European onomastic stratum, the same layer to which the name of the Umbri has been attached. Both ethnonyms have been glossed as meaning 'those of the water'.

== Ethnic identity ==
=== Early views (6th–3rd centuries BC) ===
The name Lígyes is among the oldest that Greek authors applied to the inhabitants of the western Mediterranean, but in this early tradition it carried little ethnic content. They probably used 'Ligure' as a generic name for such distant and partially known tribes, or merely as a geographic reference that had no relevance to their ethnicity. In the earliest Greek geography the peoples of the far west were all reckoned Ligurian, set in a symmetrical scheme against the Ethiopians of the south and the Scythians of the north. The name served as a broad label for the barbarians of the distant west, alongside that of the Iberians, the name of the Celts being reserved for Italy. These people of the world's end were placed at the edges of the earth, comparable to the Hyperboreans or the Ethiopians, and the archaic Greek imagination lent them a quasi-mythical character with no single historical referent. The label was applied very widely, the Corsicans, the Sicels of Sicily, and populations of the Ebro basin in Spain all being counted as Ligurian.

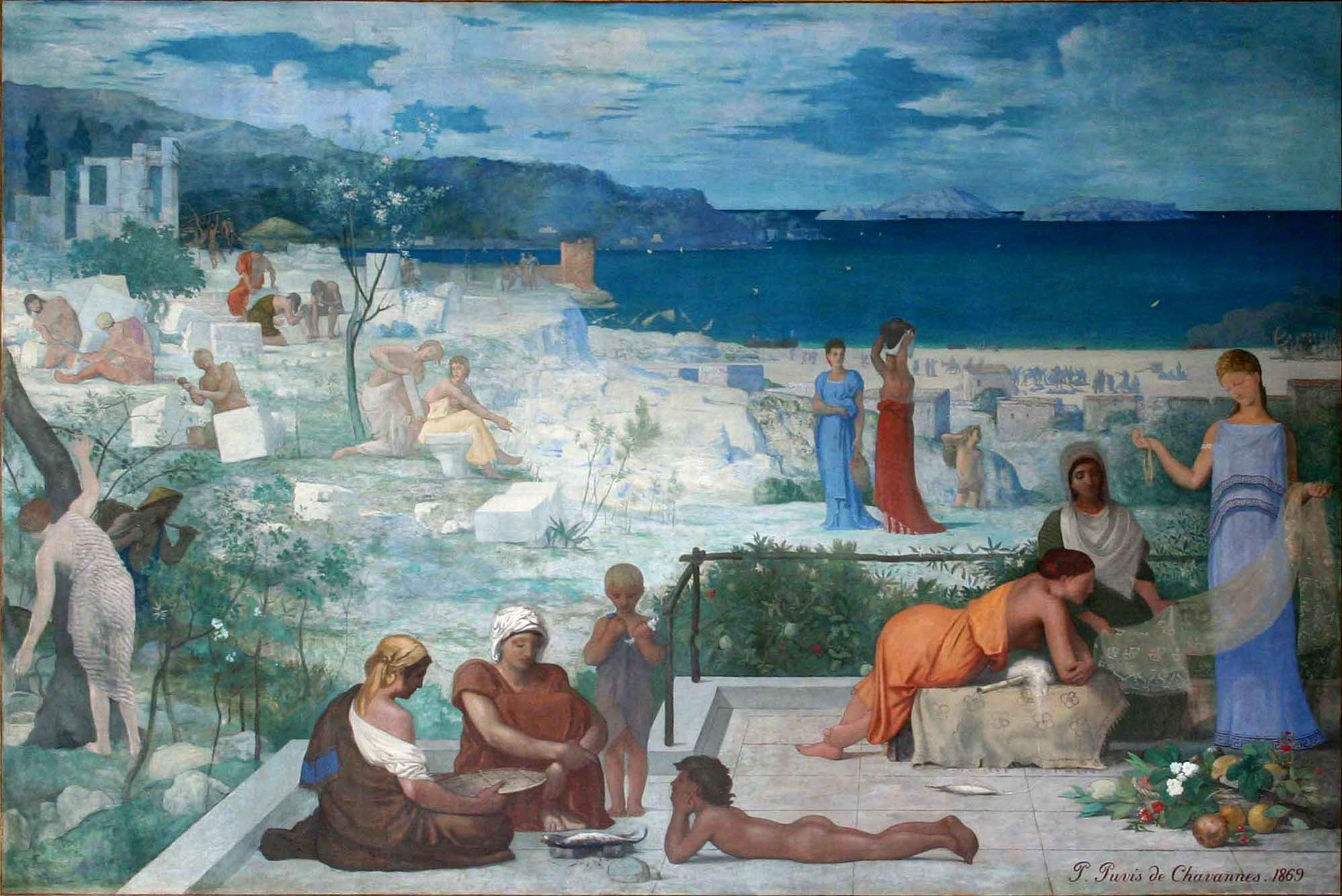
Puvis de Chavannes, Marseille colonie grecque (1867).

Even peoples of well-attested Celtic character were called Ligyes by the Greeks. The oldest accounts of the foundation of Massalia name the Segobriges as the local people, and tribes such as the Salyes were reckoned Ligurian, although the attested personal names, divine names and rulers' names of both these peoples are unambiguously Celtic. The compound Keltolígyes ('Celto-Ligures') appears only at a precise moment, when Hannibal's passage near the Rhône brought Greek observers into contact with Celts in a territory otherwise assigned to the Ligyes. It belongs to a Hellenistic class of composite ethnonyms, like Celtíberes or Celtoscythae, and was dropped once the Roman conquest gave closer knowledge of the local tribes.

=== Later descriptions (2nd century BC–1st century AD) ===
Later writers were divided over what the name denoted, and sometimes confused by earlier accounts. Some treated the Ligures as an old population that had held northern Italy before the Gauls, an indigenous stratum underlying the later Celtic peoples. Others, struck by the Celtic character of so many of the tribes called Ligurian, held instead that a Celtic presence had overlaid and in large part displaced an original Ligurian stock.

Livy (1st century BC) believed that the Ligures represented an older stratum predating the Gauls in northern Italy, while Strabo (early 1st century AD) and others observed that many of the peoples previously described as 'Ligures' were actually Celts. In an attempt to resolve these inconsistencies, Strabo proposed that Celtic influence had effectively supplanted the original Ligures. Regarding the Ligures of the Alps, Strabo clearly distinguished them from the Celts, while noting that they shared cultural similarities.

As for the Alps ... many tribes (éthnê) occupy these mountains, all Celtic (keltikà) except the Ligurians; but while these Ligurians belong to a different people (heteroethneis), still they are similar to the Celts in their modes of life (bíois)

— Strabo, Geōgraphiká, 2.5.28. (trans. Loeb)

=== Modern scholarship ===
According to some scholars, those ancient accounts suggest that the culture of the 'Ligures' of southern Gaul gradually came under the influence of a Celtic-speaking elite, as evidenced by the Celtic names of their rulers and towns, and the Celtic influence on their religion. Alternatively, a wider anthropological reappraisal, drawing on studies of pre-colonial Africa, treats ethnic groups as fluid and shifting, and their names as labels imposed from outside rather than markers of fixed peoples with clear borders.

A more radical scholarly scepticism doubts whether a Ligurian ethnos or culture existed at all. Ralph Häussler treats the distinction between Ligures and Celts as a Greco-Roman construct rather than a pre-Roman reality, arguing that many of the region's ethnic names may have taken shape only under Roman rule, in reaction to the conquest and provincial reorganisation. The distinctively non-Celtic character of the onomastics of the Italian Ligures has been taken by others to weigh against this conclusion.

== Language ==
The language of the Ligures is known only at second hand. No texts of its own have been securely identified, and it is recovered almost entirely from names, supplemented by a few glosses and by the remarks of ancient writers. Although the current consensus among specialists holds that Ligurian was an Indo-European language, its internal classification within the language family remains disputed.

=== Sources ===
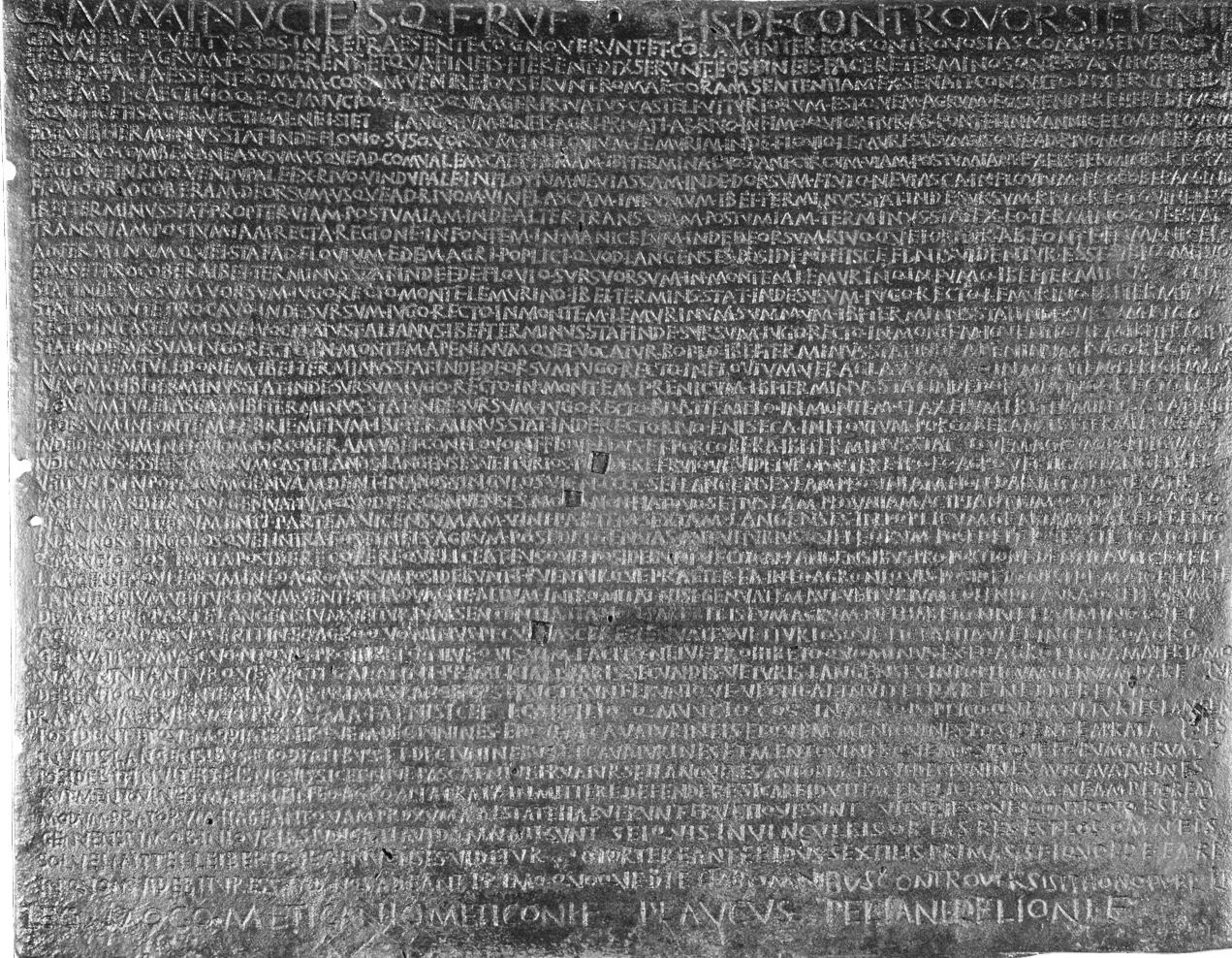
The Polcevera Tablet, dated to 117 BC

Place names are the principal source for the language, alongside the personal names recorded in the Latin inscriptions of the region. The glosses are few, one of the more interpretable being the native name of the Po, Bodincus, said in antiquity to mean 'bottomless'. The most important single document is the Polcevera Tablet from 117 BC, which preserves in Latin a series of indigenous place and river names, including the watercourses Porcobera ,Vinelasca, Neviasca, Tulelasca and Veraglasca. These forms are the core of the onomastic material conventionally labelled Ligurian.

The Ligures were largely without a script of their own, writing reaching the coast through Etruscan contact, with an Etruscan alphabet in use at the emporium of Genoa from about 525 BC. The oldest inscriptions claimed for Ligurian are the texts on the statue stelae of Lunigiana, in an Etruscan-derived North Italian script and datable to the late 7th and mid 6th centuries BC. Those funerary memorials give the names of the men they portray, but both their reading and language are disputed. Other inscriptions once taken for Ligurian are now recognised as Lepontic, a Celtic language. In late antique lists, the Ligures were still counted among the peoples credited with a language of their own.

=== Classification ===
The Ligurian language is now generally held by linguists to be Indo-European. The older view of it as a non-Indo-European, "Mediterranean" idiom akin to Iberian or Etruscan has been largely abandoned in recent scholarship. What remains open is its position within Indo-European, and above all its relation to Celtic. Opinion range from an archaic form of Celtic to a separate Indo-European language only distantly connected with it. At one end, Patrizia de Bernardo Stempel treats Ligurian as an archaic Celtic dialect ('Celto-Ligurian') in contact with a non-Celtic substratum, pointing to Celtic etymologies for Ligurian names and to the Greek label Keltolígyes. At the other, the study of Ligurian personal names by Jürgen Untermann makes it a distinct Indo-European language, related to Celtic in some of its phonology but morphologically apart. The case for a separate language rests on phonology and morphology. Ligurian was a centum language in which the inherited voiced aspirates lost their aspiration. Unlike Celtic, it kept initial *p, as in the river name Porcobera, and its onomastic suffixes, the toponymic -asc- and the gentilicial -anius, have no Celtic counterpart.

The evidence is in any case too thin for the precise position of Ligurian within Indo-European to be fixed, and any such placing is regarded as speculative.

== Geography ==
The territory assigned to the Ligures was never fixed, and modern scholarship treats 'Ligures' less as a bounded ethnic territory than as a geographic concept whose extent shifted over time. Three different senses were adopted by ancient writers: a universalist sense, in which the Ligures stood for the inhabitants of the whole western Mediterranean; a broad sense covering the coast from the Pyrenees to the Macra; and a narrow sense restricted to the Augustan ninth region of Italy together with the Alpes-Maritimes.

Modern scholars have proposed distinguishing between two zones: 'restricted Ligurian', corresponding to the Roman regio Liguria (between Ventimiglia and Ameglia, to which some add neighbouring regions in southeastern Gaul), which had a well-defined cultural identity and likely used the Ligurian language; and 'broad Ligurian', adding to this the area described by early sources as inhabited by the Ligyes (from the Arno River to west of the Rhône, and perhaps into north-eastern Spain), possibly inhabited by culturally related but likely diverse peoples who may have spoken various languages.

=== Greek Ligystikē ===
Recreation of world map of Hecataeus of Miletus (6th century BC).

In the Greek tradition the land called Ligystikē coincided with the sphere of influence of the Greek colony Massalia in southern Gaul, running along the coast from Emporion and Rhode in Catalonia to Antipolis (modern Antibes). Massalia itself was held to have been founded in Ligystikē in 600 BC. The country east of Antipolis, where Roman sources placed the Ligures, fell outside it. In its widest, universalist sense, the name reached much further, designating a 'greater Liguria' that began just beyond the Etruscans and ran along the whole north-western Mediterranean coast as far as the Pillars of Hercules (Strait of Gibraltar).

These outer limits were schematic rather than real frontiers. Where the name reportedly met that of the 'Iberians' in the hinterland of Massalia, the earliest coastal descriptions report not a boundary but a population mixed of Ligures and Iberians. The relationship with the Celts to the north was likewise one of progressive identification rather than a fixed border, since the coastal Ligyes of the Massaliote hinterland, though called 'Ligyes' by the Greeks, bore Celtic names and turned to be recognised as Celtic by ancient observers. The one stable element of the literary tradition was the eastern limit, set at the 'Tyrrhenians' (Etruscans) and shared by the Greek and the later Roman usage alike, even though its precise position varied.

Over time, as geographic knowledge improved and distinct groups like the Iberians and Gauls came into clearer focus, references to the Ligures became more concrete. Later Latin authors continued to echo elements of the older, semi-mythical tradition of the early Greeks, yet the idea of Ligures as a general label for the distant West gradually gave way to a more localised concept, placing them in a specific region around Massalia (Marseille).

=== Roman Liguria ===
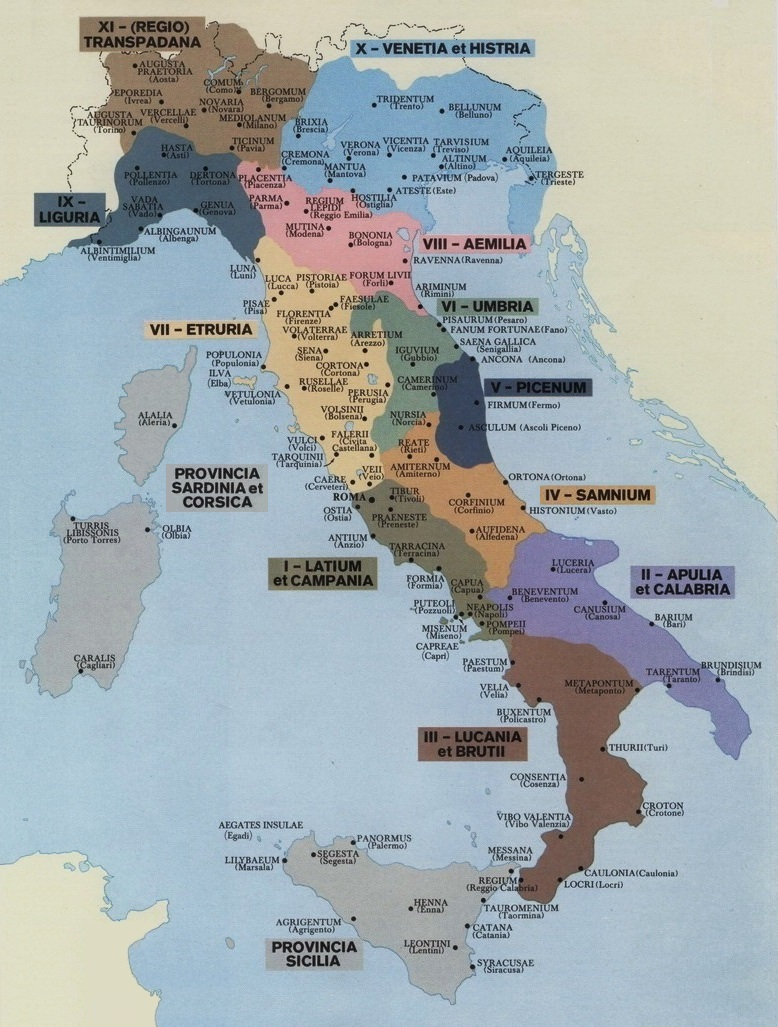
The Roman regio Liguria at the time of Augustus (7 AD), at the top left of the map.

A separate Italian tradition, independent of the earlier one and first attested in the 3rd century BC, placed the Ligures in north-western Italy, north of the Macra, under the Latin name Ligures. For instance, the Greek geographer Artemidorus (2nd century BC) placed the Ligures only in Italy. From the later 2nd century BC the geographic tradition and the Roman state tended to merge the two usages, both bounding the Ligures at the Etruscans. Pascal Arnaud has suggested that the Latin Ligures first denoted a single people of small extent near the mouth of the Macra, the name then being extended by metonymy to the other non-Gallic peoples Rome met as it advanced through the future ninth region.

The land so described was rugged: a narrow, marshy coast with few natural harbours, of which Genoa was the only real port, backed by parallel valleys cut by torrential rivers that gave access from the sea to the interior and on to the Po plain. The same tradition increasingly cast the Ligures as mountain-dwellers, treating the 'mountain Ligures' (Ligures Montani) as if they were a normal subdivision, and extended the name to Alpine peoples: in 117 BC the Stoeni were counted as Ligures, and the Taurini and the peoples of the kingdom of Cottius were likewise reckoned Ligurian.

Under Augustus the name received a fixed administrative sense, the Ligures being assigned to the ninth region of Italy, the regio IX Liguria. The region took its name from the Ligures although it covered only part of their earlier range. It reached from the Var in the west to the watershed of the Emilian Apennine and north to the Po, but several districts of old Ligurian tradition were left outside it, Veleia being attached to Aemilia and Luna with the easternmost coast to Etruria.

== History ==
=== Origins and ethnogenesis ===
The archaeological record of north-western Italy shows a distinctive material culture that took shape long before the populations of the region entered the horizon of Greek and Roman writers. A culturally distinct area covering Piedmont, Liguria, western Lombardy and the western edge of Emilia begins to stand out from the central Po plain and the rest of the peninsula in the Middle Bronze Age, around the 16th century BC. It consolidated in the Recent Bronze Age, when the facies of Alba-Solero and Sant'Antonino di Perti emerge south of the Po, marked by western transalpine Urnfield influences but distinct from the Canegrate culture of the trans-Padane north-west. This distribution coincides closely with the territory later attributed to the Ligures, from Provence to the Tuscan-Emilian Apennine. The continuity of many hilltop settlements also points to slow local evolution rather than rupture, so that the Ligures of the full Iron Age can be regarded as the descendants of the Recent Bronze Age population.

A distinct material culture is not the same as a self-aware people, however. In the reading of Angiolo Del Lucchese, the old equation of an archaeological culture with an ethnic group cannot be sustained, and the social stratification that such self-awareness presupposes is barely visible in Bronze Age Liguria. Well-defined ethnic and political units on a tribal basis probably formed only in the full Iron Age, when contact with the Etruscans and Greeks stimulated greater social articulation and a stronger need for self-identification.

The archaeological picture remains thin and provisional. For the whole span from the start of the Iron Age to the late 6th century BC the Chiavari necropolis, begun in the third quarter of the 8th century BC, long stood as the only substantial source. Finds at Genoa and Albenga and the re-examination of the cemetery at Ameglia have only recently enriched it in the early 21st century. Whether a single culture common to the whole of later Liguria existed at this date is itself uncertain, and in the assessment of Raffaele de Marinis the region was probably already divided into distinct areas, the eastern Ligures oriented toward the Po plain and Tyrrhenian Etruria, with affinities to the Golasecca culture, the western toward the more westerly Urnfield provinces and southern Gaul.

=== Greek and Etruscan contact ===
Etruscan goods reached Ligurian territory as early as the Villanovan period, before or around the beginning of the Chiavari necropolis, as shown by a crested helmet from the bed of the Tanaro near Asti and bronze axes recovered from the Po, while late Geometric Greek pottery reached Pisa and San Rocchino, exchange thus beginning to involve the Ligurian Sea and not only the upper Tyrrhenian. The rapid adoption of iron metalworking at Chiavari, the metal probably smelted from Elban ore by way of the Pisa region, reflects the strength of Etruscan influence, which quickly reshaped the culture of the coastal Ligures in technology, dress and ornament and, through the growth of maritime trade, probably in their economy and social organisation as well.

Through the 7th century BC the Ligurian coast worked as a network of small landing places running up from Tuscany, a pattern of dispersed harbours in which Chiavari played a leading part without being a true emporium. A genuine emporium emerged only with Genoa, founded on the Castello hill at the centre of the coastal arc, where ridge and valley routes reached the sea at a near-obligatory stopover between the Etruscans, the Greeks of Massalia and the Celts. From the late 7th century BC the harbour bend of the Mandraccio was used as a landing place by foreign merchants, the earliest finds being Etruscan wine amphorae, and the settlement grew as a cosmopolitan port culturally distinct from the rest of Liguria. What marked it as an emporium rather than a simple port was a sanctuary on the hilltop, on the model of Gravisca and Pyrgi, under whose protection foreign traders operated. Its population mixed Etruscan emigrants from inner Etruria with individuals of Celtic, Greek and Golaseccan origin attested by graffiti and grave goods, while routes through the Valpolcevera and the Scrivia valley tied it to the Po plain. The Etruscans controlled the emporium, introducing their cults, funerary customs and craft techniques.

From the 7th century BC the coastal sites drew the Ligures into Mediterranean trade. The oldest such centre was the cremation cemetery of Chiavari, in use from the late 8th to the early 6th century BC, whose grave goods show contacts across the Apennines and around the Tyrrhenian. The principal emporium was Genoa (Genua), founded in the same period on a harbour controlling the passes toward the Po plain. Its rich cemetery, beginning in the early 5th century BC, yielded imported Greek and Etruscan goods, and a Massiliote-derived coinage spread up the valleys behind the city into the 3rd century BC. Genoa served as the arrival point for Mediterranean goods and the redistribution centre for the hinterland, exchanging Ligurian iron, coral, cheese, honey, timber and mercenaries.

In the 5th century BC a wetter climate, the contemporary crisis of Etruria and the first southward movements of Celts disrupted these networks and prompted the fortification of many villages. Mercenary service was a second avenue of contact. Ligures had fought in the Carthaginian army at the battle of Himera in 480 BC and served Greek and Carthaginian commanders over the following two centuries, an outlet for a militant population that the loss of Carthaginian sea power later closed off.

=== Roman conquest ===
The Ligurian mountains, where the Alps merge into the Apennines and rise almost from the sea, commanded the narrow coastal road between central Italy and the north-western Mediterranean as well as the passes toward the Po plain. This made the area one of the most intractable frontiers in Roman history, dominated by raiding and guerrilla warfare rather than pitched battle, and Ligurian victories came to be regarded at Rome as a minor distinction. The simple political organisation of the mountain tribes left no lasting trace: despite the many wars, the name of not a single Ligurian leader is recorded, in sharp contrast to the neighbouring Gallic frontier.

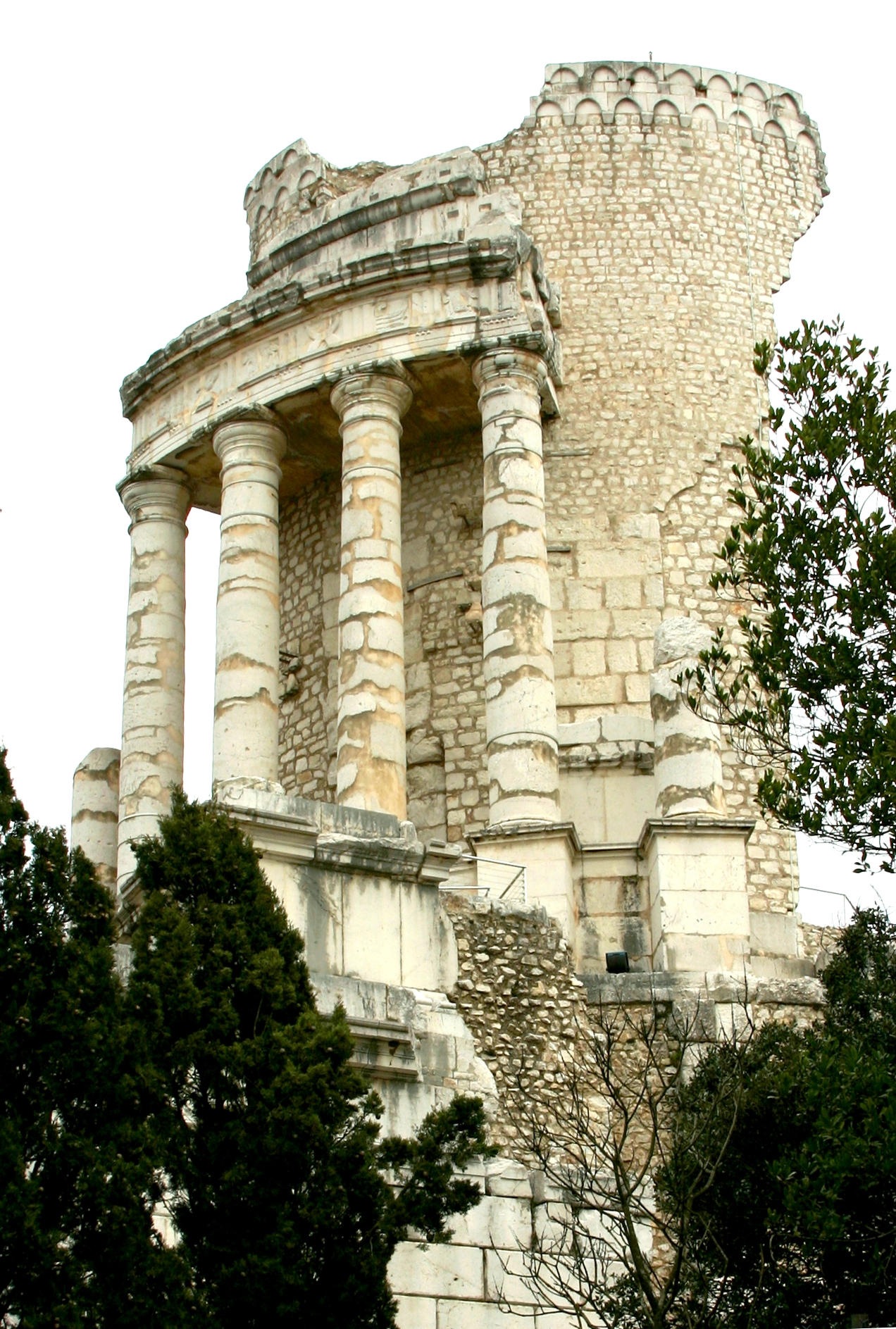
The Tropaeum Alpium at La Turbie, whose inscription lists the Alpine peoples, several of them reckoned Ligurian, subdued under Augustus

Rome's first campaigns against the Ligures fell in the 230s BC and were bound up with its new responsibilities in Sardinia and Corsica after the First Punic War. Ti. Sempronius Gracchus fought them in 238 BC, the consul P. Cornelius Lentulus won the first Ligurian triumph in 236 BC, and the wars ended with the victory and triumph of Q. Fabius Maximus in 233 BC. Renewed fighting followed as the legions reached the Po: a triumph over Gauls and Ligures was held in 223 BC, and in 218 BC, on his way to Spain, the consul P. Cornelius Scipio secured Genoa as an ally.

During the Second Punic War the Carthaginian general Mago landed at Savona, destroyed Genoa and won over the coastal Ingauni, hoping to raise the Ligures and the Gauls of the Po against Rome. The Romans rebuilt Genoa in 203 BC, defeated Mago and came to terms with the Ingauni.

The decisive struggle came in the early 2nd century BC, when Roman colonisation of Cisalpine Gaul made the long Ligurian land frontier intolerable. After a generation of nearly annual campaigns, a turning point was reached in 187 BC: the consul C. Flaminius subdued the Friniates, while M. Aemilius Lepidus defeated the powerful Apuani, began bringing mountain communities down into the plain where they could be watched, and started the road that bore his name. In 185 BC the consul Ap. Claudius Pulcher stormed six strongholds of the again-hostile Ingauni and beheaded forty-three of their leaders, and in 183 BC the colonies of Parma and Mutina were planted in former Boian land to block the Ligurian passes.

The most radical step was mass deportation. In 180 BC about 40,000 Apuani, with their women and children, were moved by sea and overland to vacant land in southern Samnium near Beneventum; a further 7,000 were transferred by Q. Fulvius Flaccus. The deported community kept its identity, and the Ligures Baebiani et Corneliani, named after the commanders who resettled them, were still distinct in Samnium in the 1st century AD. Around 177 BC the colonies of Luna and Lucca secured the southern frontier, the latter holding territory inland as far as the borders of Veleia. A final uprising in 177 BC saw the Ligures seize Mutina before the consul C. Claudius Pulcher retook it, and the main resistance of the south-eastern tribes was broken in 175 BC by Lepidus and his colleague P. Mucius Scaevola, whose campaigns also reached the Garuli, Lapicini and Hercates.

As the frontier quietened, Roman commanders began to provoke peaceable tribes for triumphs. The most notorious case involved the Statielli, a tribe of the north-western Apennines that had never attacked Rome: in 173 BC the consul M. Popillius Laenas defeated them at the unlocated stronghold of Carystus and sold the survivors into slavery. The senate, fearing that no native would again surrender to a Roman commander, ordered the freeing of all Ligures who had not been enemies of Rome since 179 BC and their resettlement across the Po, though Laenas himself escaped punishment. Sporadic mountain fighting continued until M. Claudius Marcellus drove back the Apuani for the last time in 155 BC.

=== Pacification and aftermath ===
By the mid-2nd century BC the Italian Ligures were subdued, and the resettlement of mountain populations on lower ground, combined with the linking of underdeveloped communities to centres such as Genoa through attributio, drew the survivors into the Roman economy. The south-eastern, transalpine peoples reckoned Ligurian, among them the Oxybii and Deciates, were reduced only in the later 2nd century BC, when Rome assumed direct responsibility for the sphere of Massalia. The Augustan reorganisation finally gave the name a fixed administrative sense, assigning the Ligures to the ninth region of Italy between the Var and the Macra, while the Alpine peoples reckoned Ligurian were among those commemorated as defeated on the Tropaeum Alpium at La Turbie.

After the conquest large tracts of Ligurian land were taken as Roman war booty and distributed to settlers, the ager Ligustinus et Gallicus being allotted to Roman and Latin colonists in 173 BC, while much of the indigenous population was confined to woodland and common pasture (saltus and compascua). A network of consular roads followed: the Via Postumia of 148 BC, joining Genoa to the Adriatic, the Via Aemilia Scauri through the Apennine, and finally the Via Iulia Augusta of 13 BC, which ran on to Narbonese Gaul. Romanisation was uneven, advancing on the coast and in the southern Piedmont lowlands but remaining weak in the pre-Alpine interior, where the dispersed, transhumant habits of the people resisted urban forms.

== Culture ==
=== Religion ===
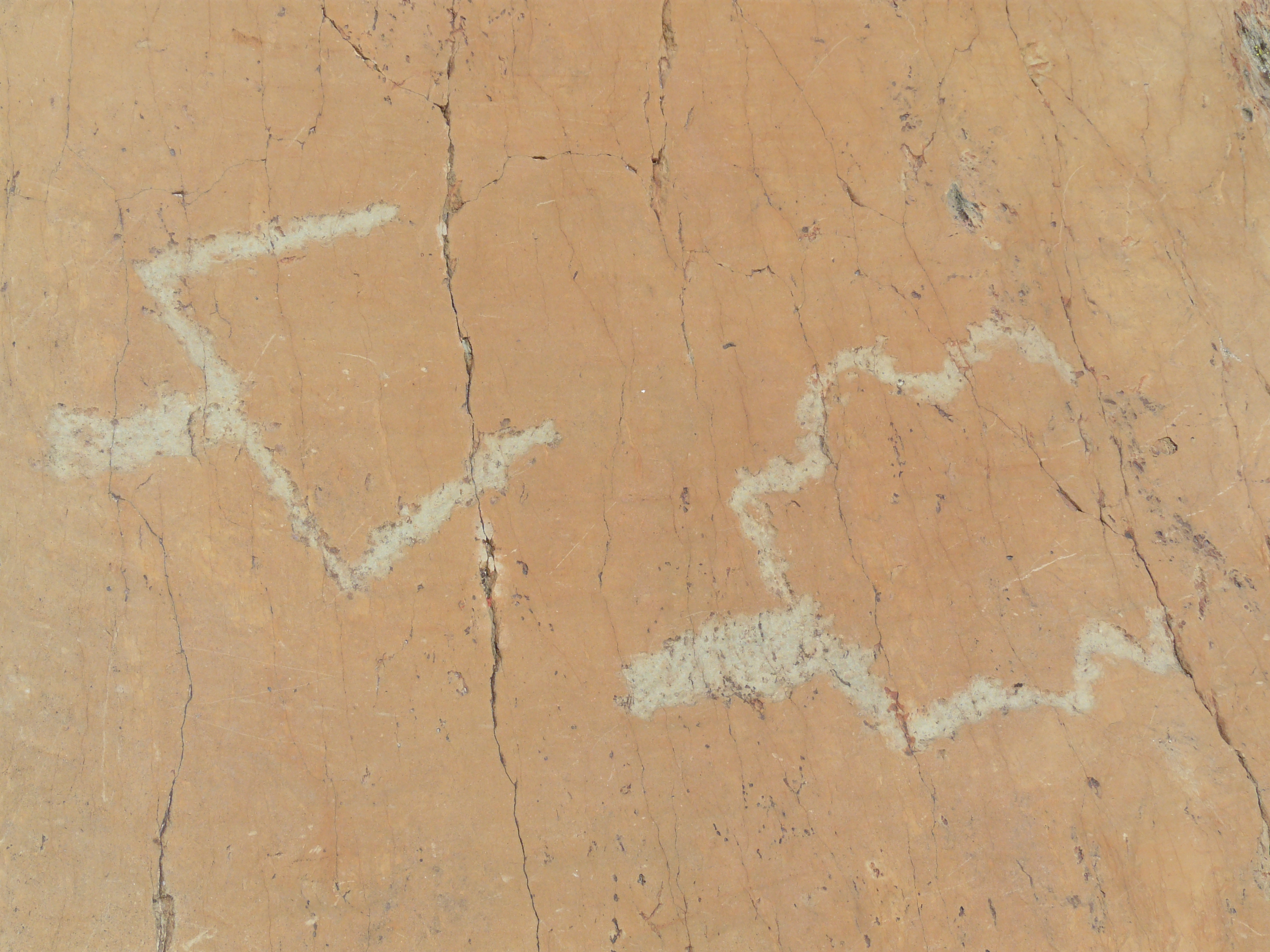
Horned figures (corniformes) among the Bronze Age rock carvings of Mont Bégo in the Maritime Alps, older than the historical Ligures

Ligurian religion was that of an agro-pastoral people, less elaborate than that of the Greeks or the Celts, and centred on natural objects and phenomena, the sun, water and the mountains, rather than on an anthropomorphic pantheon, so that it is hard to define beyond these associations. Its principal monuments are the open-air sanctuaries with engraved rocks at upland crossing-places, above all Mont Bégo in the Maritime Alps and Monte Beigua above Savona, whose carvings, of Bronze Age date and so older than the historical Ligures, depict sun-signs, lightning, horned figures, chariots, warriors and weapons and have been read as the image of a powerful deity bringing both fertility and well-being.

Cup-marks, often taken for solar symbols and sometimes joined to channels for fluids, and life-sized footprints carved in water-rich places point to a cult of water and its curative powers. The cult of mountain peaks was attached to the deity Penninus, protector of merchants and travellers and associated with the sudden storms of the high passes. Material traces of these cults are scarce: a hoard of uncirculated pseudo-Massiliote obols placed in a fissure beside a pass reflects offerings to the deities of crossroads, while a votive deposit at Caprauna, with Ligurian pottery and sheep horns, attests the worship of a horned deity between the 6th and 4th centuries BC.

A cult of the dead is suggested by the statue stelae of Lunigiana, whose sacred character is clear and which have been linked to the worship of heroic ancestors. Sanctuaries and the burial places of the dead, among the few fixed points of an otherwise dispersed pastoral world, could serve as regular assembly places that helped to hold the society together.

=== Burial customs ===
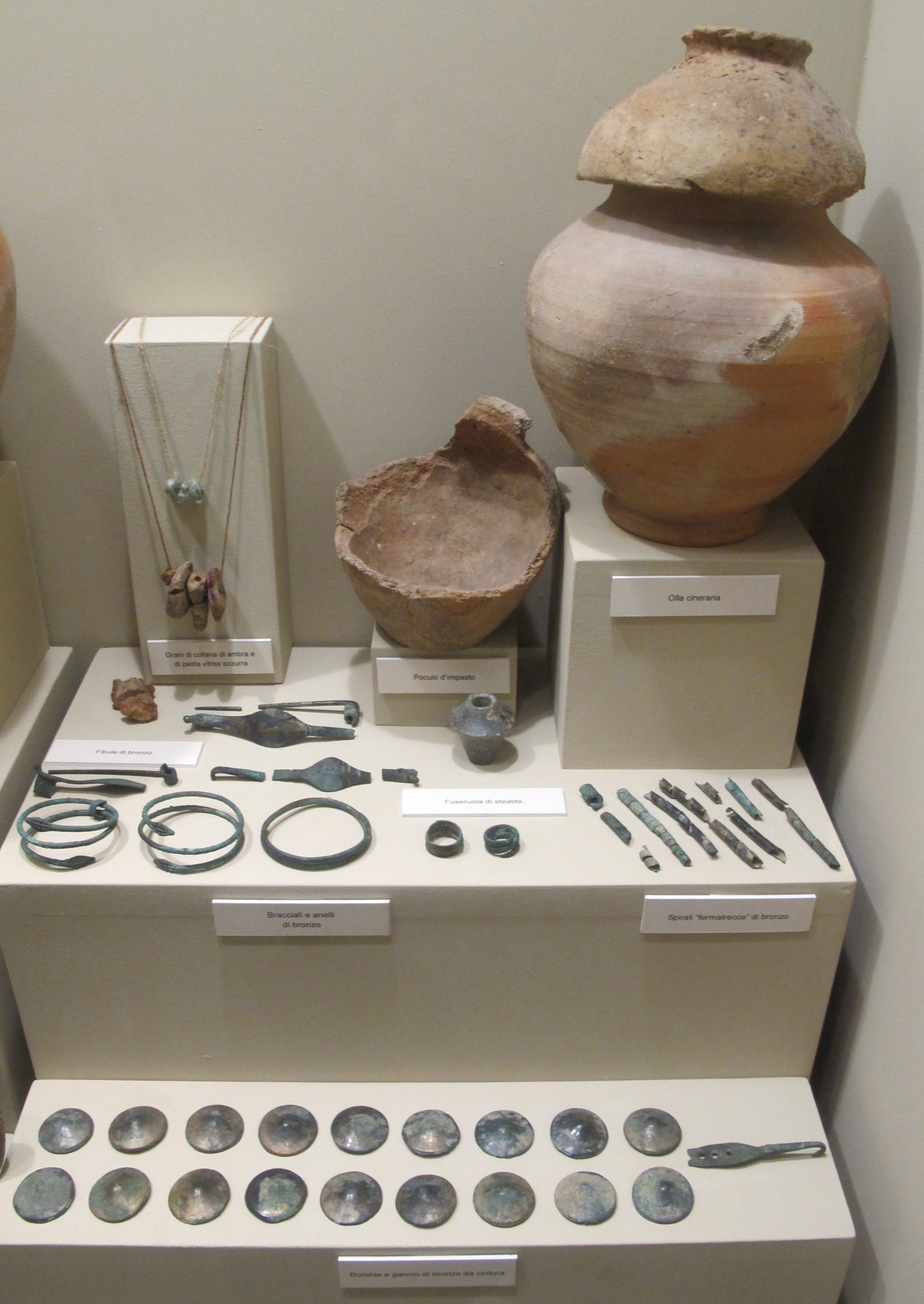
Finds from a Ligurian cist grave of the 3rd century BC from Filicaia in the Garfagnana

In Stéphane Bourdin's assessment the burial rite is the one generally recognised marker of Ligurian culture, and even that only for coastal Liguria: cremation, with the ashes and grave goods set in a cist of stone slabs. This cassetta tomb was remarkably uniform and was adopted almost universally, in the Apennine territory of the Apuani as well as on the coast, and it persisted down to the Hellenistic age. Many graves and small cemeteries are known, but only three major necropoleis, at Chiavari, Genoa and Ameglia, have been excavated, and they remain almost entirely unpublished.

The grave goods give the clearest social picture: they were ritually broken and differed between men and women, the female assemblages being the more richly furnished. The pottery is otherwise plain and almost uniform, so that rank is shown by metalwork, amber and ornaments, and at the oldest cemetery, Chiavari (later 8th to early 6th century BC), the unequal wealth of separate burial groups points to a social differentiation that deepened with Etruscan contact. As Mediterranean trade grew, imported vessels were increasingly used as cinerary urns, Greek red-figure and then black-glaze ware at Genoa in the 5th and 4th centuries BC and overturned Massaliot or Greco-Italic amphorae at Ameglia in the 4th and 3rd, where weapons were sometimes deliberately folded before burial. At Genoa the differing grave forms have been read as a sign that Etruscan settlers shared in the founding of the oppidum, but the typology of the grave goods points clearly to the Ligures.

=== Material culture ===
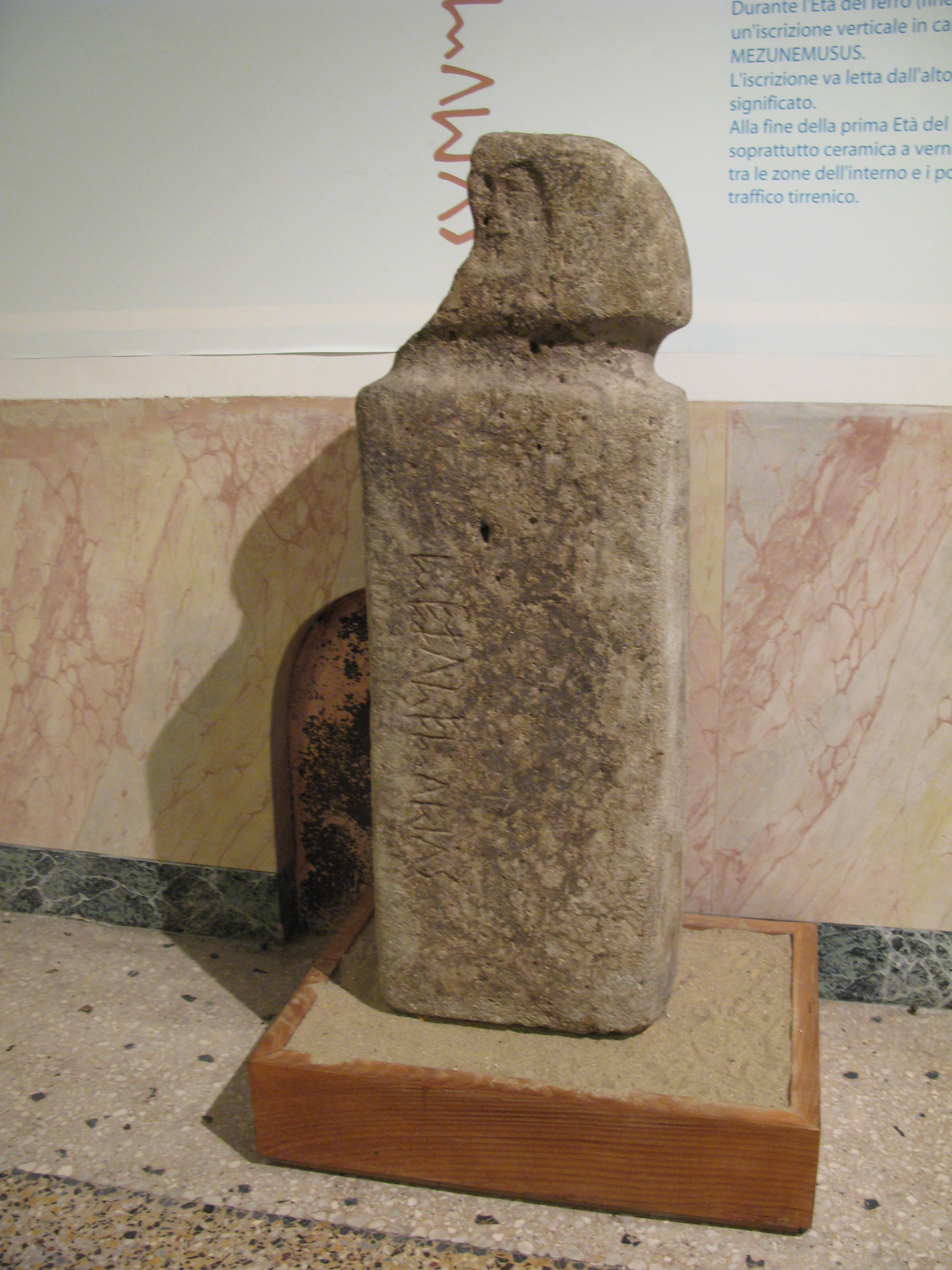
Statue stele of an armed figure from Zignago, the first Lunigiana stele discovered

The most distinctive marker of Ligurian material culture is the local pottery, hand-modelled with poorly sorted inclusions and decorated with recurring motifs such as impressed ribbons and channelling, produced from the Late Bronze Age to the end of the Iron Age. Characteristic metalwork includes cast bronze buttons, which evolved from a domed to a conical form, in a local style shared across Liguria, southern Piedmont and the area from the Maritime Alps to Lunigiana, and open-ended decorated armlets found in women's graves at Chiavari and Genoa. Imported Etruscan and Massaliot amphorae and Attic symposium pottery, present from the 7th and 6th centuries BC, show the Ligures' integration into Mediterranean trade.

The most striking Ligurian monuments are the statue stelae of Lunigiana, a group of anthropomorphic slabs found between the Magra and the Vara. Some are reworkings of much older stelae of about 3200 to 2500 BC, while others were newly carved in the 7th and 6th centuries BC and depict armed figures. Their sacred value is evident, and they have been associated with a cult of heroic ancestors.

== Society ==
=== Settlements ===
The Ligures lived mainly in small settlements on hilltops or part-way up mountain slopes, in strategic positions on ridges close to the fluvial and terrestrial routes that linked the coast with the interior and the Po plain. Sites were typically steep, with a single easily guarded approach, and required dry-stone terracing that both increased the usable space and checked erosion. Dwellings were huts of rectangular, circular or elliptical plan, with dry-stone footings and walls of reeds woven on a wooden frame and plastered with clay, set on fired clay floors under thatched roofs.

Settlement traces are scarce for the Late Bronze Age and Early Iron Age but become denser from the 7th and 6th centuries BC, when sites controlling terraced land and in visual contact with one another are found along the coast and inland, and silos of dried legumes show that they were occupied by sedentary, not merely seasonal, groups. In the 5th century BC a wetter climate, the contemporary crisis of Etruria and the first southward movements of the Celts prompted the fortification of many villages. At Genoa a 6th-century hilltop settlement on the Castello hill grew by the later 5th century into a fortified oppidum with double-curtain (emplekton) walls, a tower and a harbour-facing entrance. Beyond such walled sites, defence often relied on occupying and fortifying mountain summits, such as the heights of Auginus, Ballista and Suismontius held against the Romans in 187 BC.

=== Internal organisation ===
The Ligures of the interior formed a mountain society shaped by a pastoral economy and by a population that appears to have been large in relation to the poor resources of the land. Continuous movement of herds favoured small and sometimes unstable settlement units, but gave the inhabitants an intimate knowledge of a difficult countryside and rapid means of passing news and booty across it. Social differences are already visible in the grave goods of the Late Bronze Age cemeteries, where assemblages mark status and distinguish the burials of men and women.

Political organisation remained simple. The sources describe the interior as divided into vici and castella, and large bodies of warriors could be gathered for raiding and war, on occasion through a sacred levy, but the mechanism was loose and the chiefs themselves complained of the difficulty of controlling their followers. Despite the many wars fought against them, not a single Ligurian leader is named in the record, in sharp contrast to the neighbouring Gallic frontier, and no Ligurian client ruler is attested. References to principes and to the instigators of revolts are scattered and isolated.

The literary record names many Ligurian populi or civitates, each with one or more oppida: among them the Alpini around Savo (modern Savona), the Ingauni at Albingaunum (Albenga), the Intemelii at Albintimilium (Ventimiglia), the Statielli at the unlocated Carystus, the Celeiates at Clastidium (Casteggio), and the Friniates, Apuani, Garuli, Lapicini and others of the Apennine interior. Further communities around Genoa, the Langates and the Odiates, are named on the Polcevera Tablet, a bronze inscription of 117 BC. Beyond such names little can be said with confidence. The attempts of earlier scholars to reconstruct a layered organisation of pagi and nomina from this material are now regarded as conjectural, and the image of the Ligures transmitted by the ancient texts forms, in Pascal Arnaud's analysis, a semantic field with no single identifiable referent rather than the map of one people. The Polcevera Tablet of 117 BC shows the rural population of the Genoese hinterland organised in pagi, local districts holding pasture in common (compascuo), an arrangement debated as either a survival of indigenous organisation or a Roman administrative framework.

=== Economy ===
The Ligurian economy was a poor one, resting on herding, subsistence agriculture and the exploitation of woodland. Pastoralism and transhumance predominated, the flocks pastured by turns near the sea and in the mountains, and questions of pasturage between Genoa and its mountain neighbours are among the matters recorded on the Polcevera Tablet of 117 BC. Agriculture was limited: a low population density, and a practice of clearing woodland by fire that increased erosion and landslides, kept cultivation modest, though some cereals and vines were grown.

Access to the sea brought goods and contacts as well as danger. Through the emporium of Genoa the Ligures exchanged their own products, semi-wrought iron, coral, cheese, honey, timber and mercenaries, for Mediterranean wine, oil and fine pottery, and a Massiliote-derived coinage circulated up the valleys of the hinterland. Mercenary service was itself an important outlet for a surplus and militant population. When the loss of Carthaginian sea power in the 3rd century BC closed the principal market for Ligurian warriors, raiding and piracy became the chief alternatives, bottling up in the mountains a population that had acquired a taste for Mediterranean goods.

== Reception ==
=== Historiography ===
Scholarly assessements of the Ligurian language began in the 19th century with the study of the toponymic suffix -asc-. In 1873 Giovanni Flechia, finding it confined to north-western Italy and absent from the Celtic lands beyond the Alps, took it to be specifically Ligurian, and for decades it served as the diagnostic mark of the language, although it accounts for only a handful of the ancient names. Henri d'Arbois de Jubainville built this slender clue into a sweeping reconstruction of European prehistory in which the Ligures figured among the first Indo-European peoples of western Europe, once spread, on the testimony of ancient authors, across the whole north-western Mediterranean before being reduced by the Celts. Tracing the suffix from Italy through Corsica, France and Spain into much of western Europe, he anticipated the later notion of a shared "Old European" toponymy.

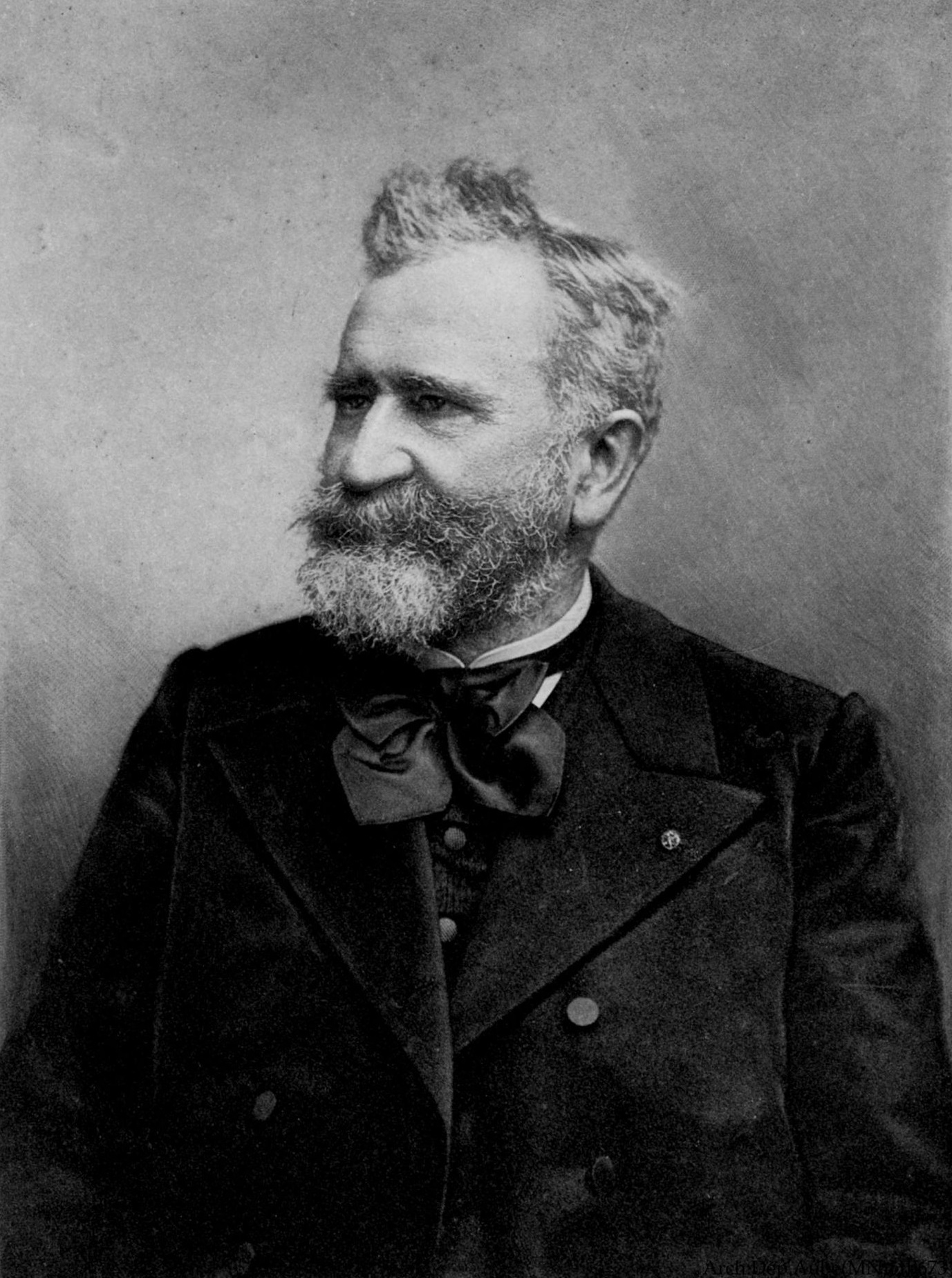
Henri d'Arbois de Jubainville

The question was soon shaped by national rivalries. A French school, following d'Arbois de Jubainville and Camille Jullian, made Ligurian an Indo-European language intermediate between Celtic and Italic, while an Italian school stressed a deep pre-Indo-European "Mediterranean" stratum beneath a thinner Indo-European one. These positions were entangled with the politics of the day, Italian scholarship inclining to an anti-Celtic, and so anti-French, emphasis and to a distrust of German Indogermanisch ('Indo-European'), tendencies later sharpened under Fascism. The Indo-European character of the language was nonetheless established from about 1900, Carl Pauli and Paul Kretschmer treating it as an independent member of the family, Joshua Whatmough as a distinct Indo-European language standing between Italic and Celtic but belonging to neither, and Vittore Pisani as an Indo-European layer superimposed on a non-Indo-European one.

Progress thereafter came mainly by subtraction, as material once claimed for Ligurian was shown to belong elsewhere. Kretschmer had sought an epigraphic foothold for the language in the inscriptions of north-western Italy and south-eastern Gaul, written in a script derived from Etruscan, a corpus that Whatmough labelled "Kelto-Liguric". The correct dating and enlargement of the Lepontic corpus from the 1960s onward dissolved this claim, showing that the language of the Golasecca region is a Celtic language in its own right and not a branch of Ligurian, and so resolving a confusion of the two that had lasted for decades.

The expansive idea that d'Arbois de Jubainville had launched, later known as 'Celto-Ligurian', meanwhile took on a life of its own. Enlarged in the second edition of his book (1889–1894), it passed from philology into archaeology, where the Ligures were tied to prehistoric cultures and spread across much of central Europe. In the 1930s it was absorbed into Julius Pokorny's Illyrian theory, which attached the etymologically intractable Indo-European place names of the West to a vast supposed Illyrian layer reaching from Gaul to the Balkans. When this Illyrian edifice collapsed in the late 1950s, Hans Krahe reworked the same material into his theory of an "Old European" hydronymy. By then the expansive sense of 'Ligurian' itself had contracted to a residue of classical glosses and the place names of Liguria proper. For Bernard Mees, this whole succession of substratum theories rested on weak or incorrectly analysed evidence and survived less as an empirical result than as a recurring theoretical ideal.

=== Ancient reception ===
Greek and Roman writers developed a stereotyped ethnographic image of the Ligures, framed by the environmental determinism of ancient geography: the poverty of their rugged, stony country was held to have made them lean, hardy and agile, frugal and inured to toil. They were pictured as living in villages rather than towns, scratching a harsh soil or quarrying stone and eking out a meagre agriculture with hunting and herding, drinking milk and a barley beverage, and sheltering in the open or in caves on a land thought closed to grain and wine. The endurance of Ligurian women, who were said to labour beside the men, was also a recurring motif.

The same tradition cast them as a warlike people whose harsh country kept Roman military discipline sharp, but one that fought by ambush and raid (latrocinia) from inaccessible mountains rather than in open battle, so that they were depicted as brigands and pirates. They were branded as well with treachery and falsehood (fallaces), a charge that reached back to the oldest Roman notices and was still repeated in late antiquity.

They also held a place in Greek myth-history, drawn into the legends of Heracles's passage through the west and of the swan-king Cycnus and the amber of the Eridanos. In the ethnographic tradition that followed, Greek and Roman writers pictured them as a hardy and frugal people of mountain and sea, while stereotyping them as savage and untrustworthy.

=== Modern reception ===
The Ligures have a long afterlife in the historical self-perception of the region. From the rediscovery in 1506 of the Polcevera Tablet, the bronze recording a Roman senatorial ruling of 117 BC, there grew up a tradition known as ligurismo, built on the idea of an unbroken ethnic continuity between the ancient Ligures and the modern inhabitants of Liguria, the Genoese above all. Anchored in antiquarian and patriotic history at the end of the 18th century, when writers cast the "primitive" Ligures as a free, frugal and indomitable people whose qualities prefigured Genoese commercial enterprise, the theme acquired a veneer of science under the naturalistic positivism of the late 19th century. It proved remarkably persistent: as late as 1961 the archaeologist Nino Lamboglia could still write that to study the ancient Ligures was to study the modern people of the region.

In that climate the Ligures became the centre of a search for the pre-Roman origins of Italy. Amateur scholars, among them Emanuele Celesia and Gaetano Poggi, treated the Ligurian dialect as the survival of a primordial "Mediterranean" language and made it the linguistic substrate underlying Latin and the Romance languages, while the measurement of skulls was offered as direct proof of ethnic descent. Conflating race, language and people, these theories were criticised at the time and were set aside by Arturo Issel, whose Liguria preistorica (1908) rejected the idea of a "Ligurian race" and observed that the name "Liguria" had never had a precise meaning, having been applied by Greeks and then Romans to a region they hardly knew.

The name itself survives in the modern region of Liguria and the Ligurian Sea, as well as in local toponymy such as Frignano in the Modenese Apennine, derived from the Ligurian Friniates.
