= Stanislas Lyonnet =

French geneticist

- Occupation: Geneticist
- Known for: Research into neurocristopathy

Stanislas Lyonnet is a French geneticist. As of 2012 he was professor of genetics at Paris Descartes University, and a clinical geneticist in the Department of Medical Genetics at the Hôpital Necker - Enfants Malades. His research is aimed at isolating the genes that cause congenital malformation and birth defects.

== Biography ==
Lyonnet studied Paediatrics and Genetics at the Pierre-and-Marie-Curie University. He obtained his Doctorate in Medicine, specializing in Pediatrics, in 1989. He obtained a Master of Science degree from the Institut Cochin and a PhD in Genetics from Necker in 1992. In 1995 he was made a full professor in the Genetic Department of the Paris Descartes Medical School. He was responsible for the Rare Disease Research Program of the French national agency for research (ANR).

Lyonnet has been a member of the board of the European Society of Human Genetics and its scientific program committee. He is a section editor of the European Journal of Human Genetics, and is on the editorial boards of Human Molecular Genetics and Clinical Dysmorphology. He teaches in the European Master of Genetics program at the Paris Descartes and Paris Diderot universities. He is also a member of the INSERM Scientific Advisory Board.

== Research ==
In 2007, he created the Laboratoire International Associé Franco-Marocain of Genetics, co-directed by Professor Abdelaziz Sefiani of the University of Rabat Medical School in Morocco. He is principal investigator and leader of the Institut National de la Santé et de la Recherche Médicale group on "Genetics and embryology of congenital malformations". This group is a founding member of the Imagine Foundation (Institut des Maladies Génétiques). His research team at Imagine focuses on forms of neurocristopathy and fetal syndromes that result from abnormal development of primary cilium and planar polarity. In 2009 INSERM awarded him a prize for his research.

== Publications ==
A selection of Lyonnet's publications:

- Tullio-Pelet A, Salomon R, Hadj-Rabia S, Mugnier C, de Laet MH, Chaouachi B, Bakiri F, Brottier P, Cattolico L, Penet C, Begeot M, Naville D, Nicolino M, Chaussain JL, Weissenbach J, Munnich A, Lyonnet S. Mutant WD-repeat protein in triple-A syndrome. Nat Genet 2000, 26 : 332-5.
- Bolk S, Pelet A, Hofstra RM, Angrist M, Salomon R, Croaker D, Buys CH, Lyonnet S, Chakravarti A. A human model for multigenic inheritance: phenotypic expression in Hirschsprung disease requires both the RET gene and a new 9q31 locus. Proc Natl Acad Sci U S A 2000, 97 : 268-73.
- Bolk S*, Salomon R* (* : equal contribution), Pelet A, Angrist M, Amiel J, Fornage, Attié-Bitach T, Olson JM, Steffann J, Hofstra R, Buys C, Munnich A, Lyonnet S, Chakravarti A. Segregation at three loci explains familial and population risk in Hirschsprung disease. Nat Genet 2002, 31: 89-93.
- Amiel J, Laudier B, Attié-Bitach T, Trang H, de Pontual L, Gener B, Trochet D, Etchevers H, Ray P, Simonneau M, Vekemans M, Munnich A, Gaultier C, Lyonnet S. Polyalanine expansion and frame shift mutations of the paired-lik homeobox gene PHOX2B in congenital central hypoventilation syndrome (Ondine’s curse). Nat Genet 2003, 33: 459-461.
- Trochet D, Bourdeault F, Janoueix I, Deville A, de Pontual L, Schleiermacher G, Coze C, Philip N, Frébourg T, Munnich A, Lyonnet S, Delattre O, Amiel J. Germline mutation of the paired-like homeobox 2B (PHOX2B) gene in neuroblastoma. Am J Hum Genet 2004, 74: 761-4.
- Trochet D, O'Brien LM, Gozal D, Trang H, Nordenskjold A, Laudier B, Svensson PJ, Uhrig S, Cole T, Niemann S, Munnich A, Gaultier C, Lyonnet S, Amiel J. PHOX2B genotype allows for prediction of tumor risk in congenital central hypoventilation syndrome. Am J Hum Genet 2005, 76: 421-6.
- Baala L, Briault S, Etchevers HC, Laumonnier F, Natiq A, Amiel J, Boddaert N, Picard C, Sbiti A, Asermouh A, Attie-Bitach T, Encha-Razavi F, Munnich A, Sefiani A, Lyonnet S. Homozygous silencing of T-box transcription factor EOMES leads to microcephaly with polymicrogyria and corpus callosum agenesis. Nat Genet. 2007 Apr;39(4):454-6.
- Thomas S, Thomas M, Wincker P, Babarit C, Xu P-T, Speer MC, Munnich A, Lyonnet S, Vekemans M, Etchevers HC. Human neural crest cells share a complex molecular signature with embryonic stem cells. Hum Mol Genet 2008, 17: 3411-25.
- Benko S, Fantes JA, Amiel J, Kleinjan DJ, Thomas S, Ramsay J, Jamshidi N, Essafi A, Heaney S, Gordon CT, McBride D, Golzio C, Fisher M, Perry P, Abadie V, Ayuso C, Holder-Espinasse M, Kilpatrick N, Lees MN, Picard A, Temple I, Thomas P, Vazquez MP, Vekemans M, Roest-Crollius H, Hastie ND, Munnich A, Etchevers HC, Pelet A, Farlie PG, FitzPatrick D, Lyonnet S. Disruption of very distant highly conserved non-coding elements on either side of the SOX9 gene is associated with Pierre Robin sequence. Nat Genet 2009, 41: 359-64.
- Putoux A, Thomas S, et al. Costal2 (KIF7) mutations cause fetal Hydrolethalus and Acrocallosal syndromes and expand the ciliopathy spectrum. Nat Genet 2011, in press.
