= FAM43A =

Protein-coding gene in the species Homo sapiens

Identifiers
- Aliases: FAM43A, family with sequence similarity 43 member A
- External IDs: MGI: 2676309; HomoloGene: 17800; GeneCards: FAM43A; OMA:FAM43A - orthologs

Gene location (Human)
Chr.	Chromosome 3 (human)
Band	3q29	Start	194,685,883 bp
Band	3q29	End	194,689,037 bp

Gene location (Mouse)
Chr.	Chromosome 16 (mouse)
Band	16|16 B2	Start	30,418,541 bp
Band	16|16 B2	End	30,421,615 bp
RNA expression pattern
Bgee	Human / Mouse (ortholog); Top expressed in: pons; tendon of biceps brachii; spleen; human penis; gingival epithelium; stromal cell of endometrium; lower lobe of lung; myocardium of left ventricle; vulva; renal medulla / Top expressed in: vestibular membrane of cochlear duct; mesenteric lymph nodes; myocardium of ventricle; decidua; suprachiasmatic nucleus; intercostal muscle; spleen; left ventricle; aortic valve; digastric muscle; More reference expression data
BioGPS	n/a
Orthologs
Species	Human	Mouse
Entrez	131583	224093
Ensembl	ENSG00000185112	ENSMUSG00000046546
UniProt	Q8N2R8	Q8BUP8
RefSeq (mRNA)	NM_153690	NM_177632
RefSeq (protein)	NP_710157	NP_808300
Location (UCSC)	Chr 3: 194.69 – 194.69 Mb	Chr 16: 30.42 – 30.42 Mb
PubMed search
- Wikidata
View/Edit Human	View/Edit Mouse

The family with sequence similarity 43 member A (FAM43A) gene, also known as; GCO3P195887, GC03P194406, GC03P191784, and NM_153690.3, codes for a 423 bp protein that is conserved in primates, and orthologs have been found in vertebrate and invertebrate species. Three transcripts have been identified, two protein coding isoforms (aAug10, bAug10), and a non-coding transcript (cAug10). Molecular weight of 45.8 kdal in the unphosphorylated state and isoelectric point of 6.1.

== Gene ==
Located on the long arm of Chromosome 3 at 3q29, FAM43A consists of 2,493 bases; and the translated protein contains a phosphotyrosine interaction domain, putative phosphoinositide binding site and putative peptide binding sites.

== Introduction ==
The FAM43A gene has been identified in cDNA screening as a possible cancer development and progression candidate gene. Unpublished data from Zhang et al. indicates that FAM43A could possess tumor suppressor function however the direct interaction is unknown. As well as playing a role in cancer development, FAM43A has been identified as a possible autism spectrum disorder (ASD) candidate gene, with mutations within the upstream single nucleotide polymorphism (SNP) rs789859 correlating with the presentation of ASD and learning disorder; suggesting that this SNP is the promoter region for the downstream FAM43A gene. The 2014 study completed by Baron-Cohen et al. involved the screening of 906 K SNPs within the genome to identify possible candidate genes, with FAM43A being the closest gene to the polymorphism.

== Protein ==
FAM43A and paralog FAM43B comprise a specific gene family, and share structural homology with the low-density lipoprotein receptor adaptor protein (LDLrP). Orthologs were identified in Mammalia, Aves, Actinopterygii, Reptilia, Hemichordata, Cephalochardata, Mollusca, Brachiopoda, Nematoda, and Arthropoda. No orthologs were identified beyond invertebrate species.

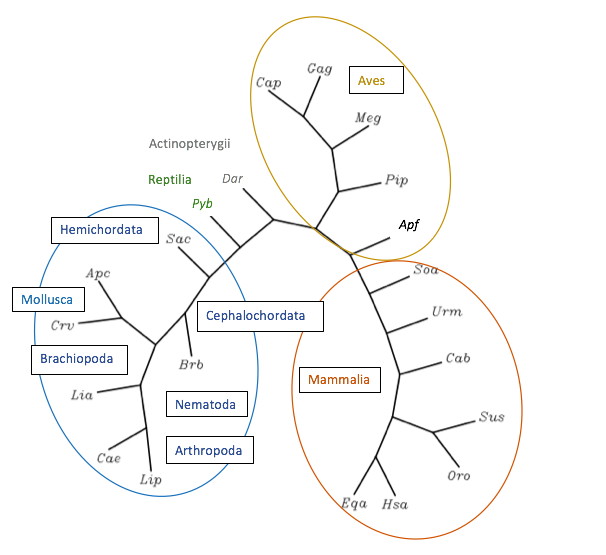
Unrooted Phylogenetic tree indicating orthologs in Mammalia, Aves, Actinoptergii, Reptilia, and several invertebrate species.

=== Paralogs ===
FAM43A and paralog FAM43B comprise a specific gene family who share structural homology with the low-density lipoprotein receptor adaptor protein (LDLrP).

=== Orthologs ===
Scientific name	Name	Accession	Sequence Similarity %
Gorilla gorilla	gorilla	XP_004038285.1	99
Orcinus orca	killer whale	XP_004278817.1	94
Gallus gallus	chicken	XP_426700.2	74
Danio rerio	zebrafish	NP_999870.1	71
Python bivittatus	python	XP_007440325.1	51
Branchiostoma belcheri	lancelet	XP_0196466582.1	49
Limulus polyphpemus	horseshoe crab	XP_013779827.1	38
Caenorhabditis elegans	nematode	NP_509937.1	35

A distant homolog was identified using NCBI protein BLAST, low density lipoprotein receptor adaptor protein 1-like in [Cryptotermes secundus]. However, when the sequence LOC111863195 was compared to Homo sapiens, it was discovered that the homolog mapped to chromosome 1, making it an ortholog of the paralog FAM43B. The fact that FAM43A protein cannot be traced back any further in evolutionary history than invertebrates indicates that this could be the point that FAM43A and paralog FAM43B diverged, approximately 797 million years ago (MYA).

== Expression ==
=== Tissue specific expression ===
FAM43A protein is highly expressed in the mouth, vascular system, spleen and ear. Significant expression noted in the adipose tissue, umbilical cord, and bone, with highest expression in the infant developmental stage.

=== Disease state expression ===
Expression is upregulated in head and neck tumor and bladder carcinoma, suggesting an oncogenic function. FAM43A expression is upregulated in Early T-cell precursor (ETP) acute lymphoblastic leukemia (ALL) (GDS4299) and triple negative breast cancer (TNBC) cell lines Hs578T (GDS4092). FAM43A expression map of Mus musculus brain indicated differential expression in the cortex, corpus callosum, and hypothalamus. The primary function of the corpus callosum is to innervate and connect the two hemispheres of the brain. The corpus callosum integrates motor, sensory, and cognitive performance between the cortical region in one hemisphere with its target in the other hemisphere. The hypothalamus links the nervous system to the endocrine system through the pituitary gland.

== Variation ==
3q29 microdeletion syndrome (monosomy 3q29) is caused by interstitial deletions of 3q29, mediated by nonallelic homologous recombination between low-copy repeats resulting in a common deletion. 3q29 microdeletion syndrome is marked by the loss of 1.6 million base pairs, including 5 known genes and 17 unknown transcripts. Genes phosphate and cytidyltransferase 1, choline alpha (PYT1A), P21 (RAC1) activated kinase 2 (PAK2), melanotransferrin (MFI2), discs large MAGUK scaffold protein 1 (DLG1), and 3-hydroxybutyrate dehydrogenase 1 (BDH1) have been confirmed and another 7 genes have been implicated with incomplete cDNAs, and the remaining hypothetical genes are yet to be confirmed experimentally. Presentation of 3q29 microdeletion syndrome has shown increased risk for schizophrenia. Gene neighbors PAK2 and DLG1 have been implicated due to interaction with neuroligin and the AMPA receptor subunit GluR1. In 2015, Guida et al. identified a novel mutation proximal to the 3q29 microdeletion region that correlated with presentation of oculo auriculo vertebral spectrum (OAVS). Research of Robertson et al. revealed the presence of FAM43A mRNA in the fetal cochlea and association with development of normal hearing function. These findings indicate that variation in FAM43A could be responsible for the development of OAVS.

=== Promoter ===
Transcription factor binding can be seen below within the FAM43A promoter region, searches were completed on the 500 bp preceding the start codon.

Candidate transcription factors and binding sites of FAM43A identified by Genomatix
Matrix Family	Detailed Family Information	Anchor position	Strand	Matrix sim.	Sequence
ZICF	ZIC-family, zinc finger of the cerebellum	1912	-	0.931	cggcgCAGCtgggcg
NEUR	NeuroD, Beta2, HLH domain	1912	+	0.985	cgcccaGCTGcgccg
PLAG	Pleomorphic adenoma gene	1919	-	0.931	ggaggGCGCcccggcgcagctgg
EGRF	EGR/nerve growth factor induced protein C & related factors	1896	-	0.919	ggcggcggCGGCggagcgc
KLFS	kruppel like transcription factors	1796	-	0.941	tagggagttGGGGggaggg
GCMF	Chorion-specific transcription factors with a GCM DNA binding domain	1742	-	0.919	attaCCCGcacctc
SORY	SOX/SORY sex/testes determining and related HMG box factors	1741	+	0.953	agagAATTtacccgcacctcctg
EBOX	E-box binding factors	1674	+	0.921	gtgcgcgCGTGtctccc
E2FF	E2F-myc activator/cell cycle regulator	1549	+	0.905	tgtgtGCGCgcgtgtct
MTF1	Metal induced transcription factor	1635	+	0.900	ctttGCTCtcgccct
ETSF	Human and murine ETS1 factors	1565	-	0.934	aaatgtcaGGAAaaaagctag
FKHD	Forkhead domain factors	1541	-	0.986	cgcgtgcAAATaaagag
INSN	Insulinoma associated factors	1462	+	0.926	tgttaGGGGaccc

=== 3' untranslated region ===
MicroRNA binding sites were identified and then compared to species conservation of FAM43A to determine likely 3' untranslated region (UTR) stem loop structures as depicted to the right.

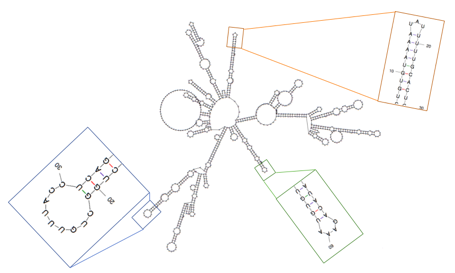
3' untranslated region secondary structure

=== Post-translational Modification ===
FAM43 is predicted to be a nuclear protein, to identify function, structure and function for LDL receptor adaptor protein (LDLrP) was completed. Conserved residues Y52 and S93 are highlighted in the structure of LDLrP to the right. Three phosphorylation sites were identified with conservation between human and mouse genotypes at T112-p, S114-p, and T-379-p. The translated protein contains a primary and secondary nuclear localization signal and has a predicted GPI-linkage site at D407, and a Caspase 3 and 7 cleavage site from amino acids 404-408 indicating possible translocation from the cell membrane to the nucleus.

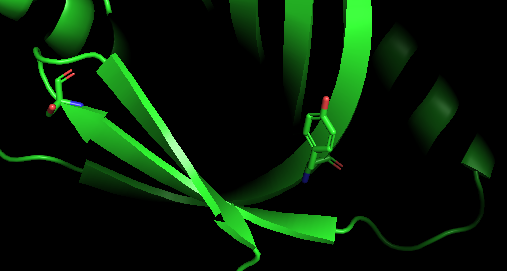
LDLrP phosphotyrosine interaction domain with Y52 and S93 highlighted.

== Interacting Proteins ==
Direct interaction with SRPK2 (SRSF Protein Kinase 2), Serine/arginine-rich protein-specific kinase, which phosphorylates substrates at serine residues rich in Arginine/Serine dipeptides (RS domains), involved in the phosphorylation of SR splicing factors and the regulation of splicing. SRSF protein kinase 2 promotes neural apoptosis by up-regulating cyclin-D1 expression through the suppression of p53/TP53 phosphorylation. Protein phosphatase 2A is one of the four major Ser/Thr phosphatases which regulate negative control of cell growth and division. FAM43A shows predicted interaction with the Abelson (ABL) kinase, and ABL members link diverse extracellular stimuli to signaling pathways controlling cell growth, survival, invasion, adhesion, and migration.

Interacting protein alias	Full name	Function	Interaction Type
SRPK2	Serine/arginine-rich protein-specific kinase	Phosphorylates substrates at RS domains	direct interaction
PPP2R5C	Protein Phosphatase 2A Regulatory Subunit B'Gamma	Phosphatase 2A regulatory subunit B family	physical association
PPP2R1B	Protein Phosphatase 2A Scaffold Subunit A beta	constant regulatory subunit of protein phosphatase 2	physical association
PPP2R5D	Protein Phosphatase 2A Regulatory Subunit B'Delta	Phosphatase 2A regulatory subunit B family	physical association
PPP2R5A	Protein Phosphatase 2A Regulatory Subunit B'Alpha	Phosphatase 2A regulatory subunit B family	physical association
PPP2R5B	Protein Phosphatase 2A Regulatory Subunit B'Beta	Phosphatase 2A regulatory subunit B family	physical association
PPP2R5E	Protein Phosphatase 2A Regulatory Subunit B'Epsilon	Phosphastase 2A regulatory subunit B family	physical association
SNX6	Sorting Nexin 6	Members contain a phox (PX) phosphoinositide binding domain (intracellular trafficking)	physical association
