= Genetic history of Italy =

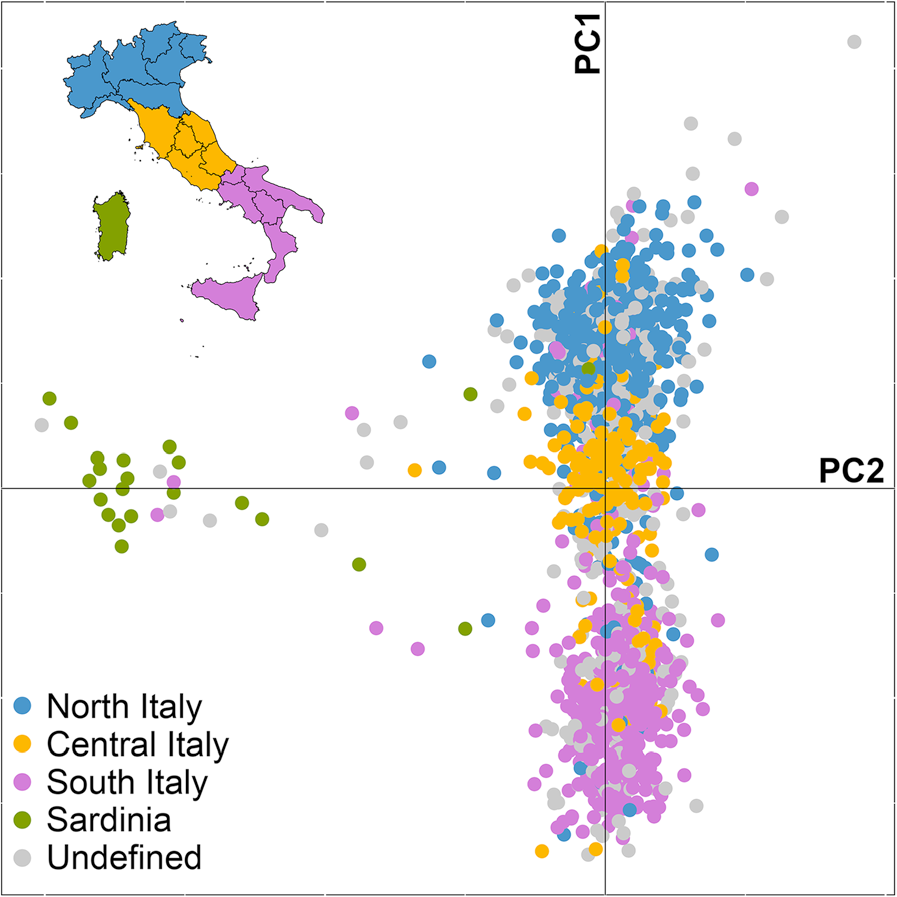
Principal Component Analysis of the Italian population

The genetic history of Italy includes information around the formation, ethnogenesis, and other DNA-specific information about the inhabitants of Italy. Modern Italians mainly descend from the ancient peoples of Italy, including Indo-European speakers (Romans and other Latins, Falisci, Picentes, Umbrians, Oscans, Sicels, Sicani, Elymians, and Adriatic Veneti, as well as Magno-Greeks, Cisalpine Gauls and Iapygians) and pre-Indo-European speakers (Etruscans, Ligures, Rhaetians, Euganei, Nuragic peoples). Based on DNA analysis, there is evidence of regional genetic substructure and continuity within modern Italy dating back to antiquity.

== Overview ==
In their admixture ratios, Italians are similar to other Southern Europeans of the Mediterranean region, and that is being of primarily Neolithic Early European Farmer ancestry, along with smaller, but still significant, amounts of Mesolithic Western Hunter-Gatherer, Bronze Age Steppe pastoralist (Indo-European speakers) and Chalcolithic or Neolithic Caucasus/Iranian-related ancestry. According to multiple genome-wide studies, Southern Italians are closest to modern Greeks, while Northern Italians are closest to the Spaniards, the Portuguese, and the Southern French. There is Bronze/Iron Age Middle Eastern and Western Asian admixture in Italy, related to Caucasian hunter-gatherers and Iranian Neolithic-related ancestry, with a lower incidence in Northern Italy compared with Central Italy and Southern Italy. North African admixture dated to the Bronze Age, the Iron Age and the Middle Ages is found in Southern Italy, with the highest incidence in Sicily and Sardinia.

Multiple DNA studies confirmed that genetic variation in Italy is clinal, going from the Eastern to the Western Mediterranean. Reflecting the history of Europe and the broader Mediterranean basin, the Italian populations have been found to be made up mostly of the same ancestral components, albeit in different proportions, from the Mesolithic, Neolithic and Bronze Age settlements of Europe.

The genetic gap between northern and southern Italians is filled by an intermediate Central Italian cluster, creating a continuous cline of variation that mirrors geography. The only exceptions are some minority populations (mostly Slovene minorities from the region of Friuli-Venezia Giulia) who cluster with the Slavic-speaking Central Europeans in Slovenia, as well as the Sardinians, who are clearly differentiated from the populations of both mainland Italy and Sicily. A study on some linguistic and isolated communities residing in Italy revealed that their genetic diversity at short (0–200 km) and intermediate distances (700–800 km) was greater than that observed throughout the entire European continent.

The genetic distance between Northern and Southern Italians, although large for a single European nationality, is similar to that between the Northern and the Southern Germans. Northern and Southern Italians began to diverge as early as the Late Glacial, and appear to encapsulate at a smaller scale the cline of genetic diversity observable across Europe.

== Prehistoric and historical populations of Italy ==
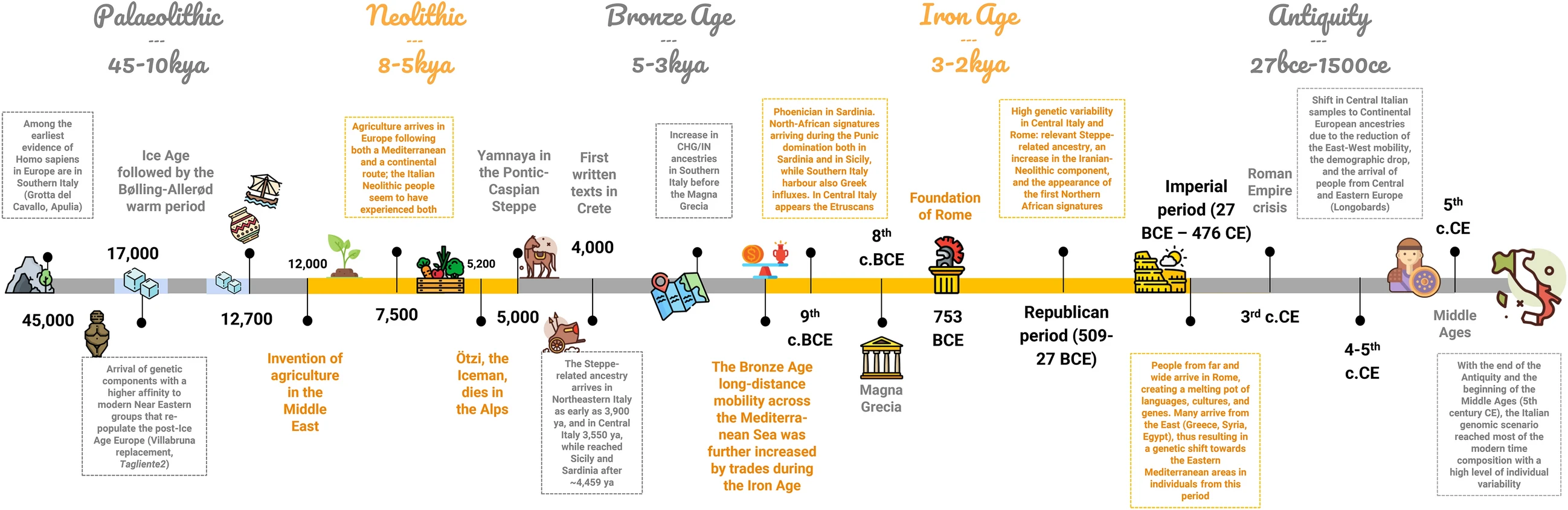
Timeline summarizing the main demographic events in ancient Italy, from the Paleolithic to the Middle Ages.

Ethnic groups of Italy (as defined by today's borders) in the 4th century BC.

Modern humans appeared during the Upper Paleolithic. Specimens of Aurignacian age were discovered in the cave of Fumane and date back about 34,000 years. During the Magdalenian period, the first humans from the Pyrenees populated Sardinia.

During the Neolithic period, farming was introduced by people from the east and the first villages were built. Weapons became more sophisticated and the first objects in clay were produced. In the late Neolithic era the use of copper spread, and villages were built over piles near lakes. In Sardinia, Sicily and a part of Mainland Italy the Beaker culture spread from Western and Central Europe. Sicily also suffered the influences of the Aegean in the Mycenaean period.

During the Late Bronze Age the Urnfield Proto-Villanovan culture appeared in Central and Northern Italy. It is characterized by the rite of cremation of dead bodies, which originated from Central Europe. The use of iron began to spread. In Sardinia, the Nuragic civilization flourished.

At the dawn of the Iron Age much of Italy was inhabited by Italic tribes such as the Latins, Sabines, Samnites, and Umbrians. The Northwest and Alpine territories were populated primarily by pre-Indo European speakers such as the Etruscans, Ligurians, Camunni and Raetians; while Iapygian tribes, possibly of Illyrian origin, populated Apulia.

From the 8th century BC, Greek colonists settled on the southern Italian coast and founded cities, forming what would be later called Magna Graecia. Around the same time, Phoenician colonists settled on the western side of Sicily. During the same period the Etruscan civilization developed on the coast of Southern Tuscany and Northern Latium. In the 4th century BC, Gauls settled in Northern Italy and in parts of Central Italy. With the fall of the Western Roman Empire, different populations of Germanic origin invaded Italy, the most significant being the Lombards, followed five centuries later by the Normans in Sicily.

The Iron Age and early Republican Italic and Etruscan samples overlap with present-day Italians and other west Mediterranean populations. DNA analysis demonstrates that ancient Greek colonization had a significant lasting effect on the local genetic landscape of Southern Italy and Sicily (Magna Graecia), with modern people from that region having significant Greek admixture. Overall, the genetic differentiation between the Latins, Etruscans and the preceding proto-Villanovan population of Italy was found to be insignificant.

Recent DNA studies confirmed the arrival of Steppe-related ancestry and Y-haplogroup R1b-M269/P312 in Northern Italy to at least 2000 BCE and in Central Italy by 1600 BCE, with this ancestral component increasing through time. Yediay et al. (2024, Preprint) confirms that the arrival of this Steppe-related ancestry in Italy was primarily mediated by Western European Bell Beaker populations, likely contributing to the emergence of the Italic and Celtic languages and consistent with the Italo-Celtic linguistic hypothesis. This Bell Beaker-related steppe ancestry was in turn derived from the earlier Corded Ware culture, rather than directly from the Yamnaya culture. The Greeks and the Illyrians, who had acquired Western steppe herder ancestry directly from Yamnaya groups of Eastern Europe, thus represented a secondary source of this lineage in Italy, alongside Y-chromosome haplogroups like R1b-Z2103 (Z2108), I-M223, J-M12 (J2b-L283) and J2a-Y7011.

Several studies traced a substantial migration from the Eastern Mediterranean into the Italian peninsula during the Principate. (Note: Antonio ML, Gao Z, Moots HM, Lucci M, Candilio F, Sawyer S, et al. (November 2019). "Ancient Rome: A genetic crossroads of Europe and the Mediterranean". Science. 366 (6466). American Association for the Advancement of Science: 708–714. Bibcode:2019Sci...366..708A. doi:10.1126/science.aay6826. hdl:2318/1715466. PMC 7093155. PMID 31699931. "Interestingly, although Iron Age individuals were sampled from both Etruscan (n=3) and Latin (n=6) contexts, we did not detect any significant differences between the two groups with f4 statistics in the form of f4(RMPR_Etruscan, RMPR_Latin; test population, Onge), suggesting shared origins or extensive genetic exchange between them. ... In the Medieval and early modern periods (n = 28 individuals), we observe an ancestry shift toward central and northern Europe in PCA (Fig. 3E), as well as a further increase in the European cluster (C7) and loss of the Near Eastern and eastern Mediterranean clusters (C4 and C5) in ChromoPainter (Fig. 4C). The Medieval population is roughly centered on modern-day central Italians (Fig. 3F). It can be modeled as a two-way combination of Rome's Late Antique population and a European donor population, with potential sources including many ancient and modern populations in central and northern Europe: Lombards from Hungary, Saxons from England, and Vikings from Sweden, among others (table S26)." Community commentary:.) This Eastern Mediterranean signal, whose ultimate origins lies in the contemporary Anatolia, although minor geneflow from Southeastern Europe, the Levant, and the South Caucasus cannot be excluded, persists in the genetic record of Medieval and modern-day Italian populations albeit in a heavily diluited form due to significant genetic admixture with Central and Northern European groups.

=== Daunians ===
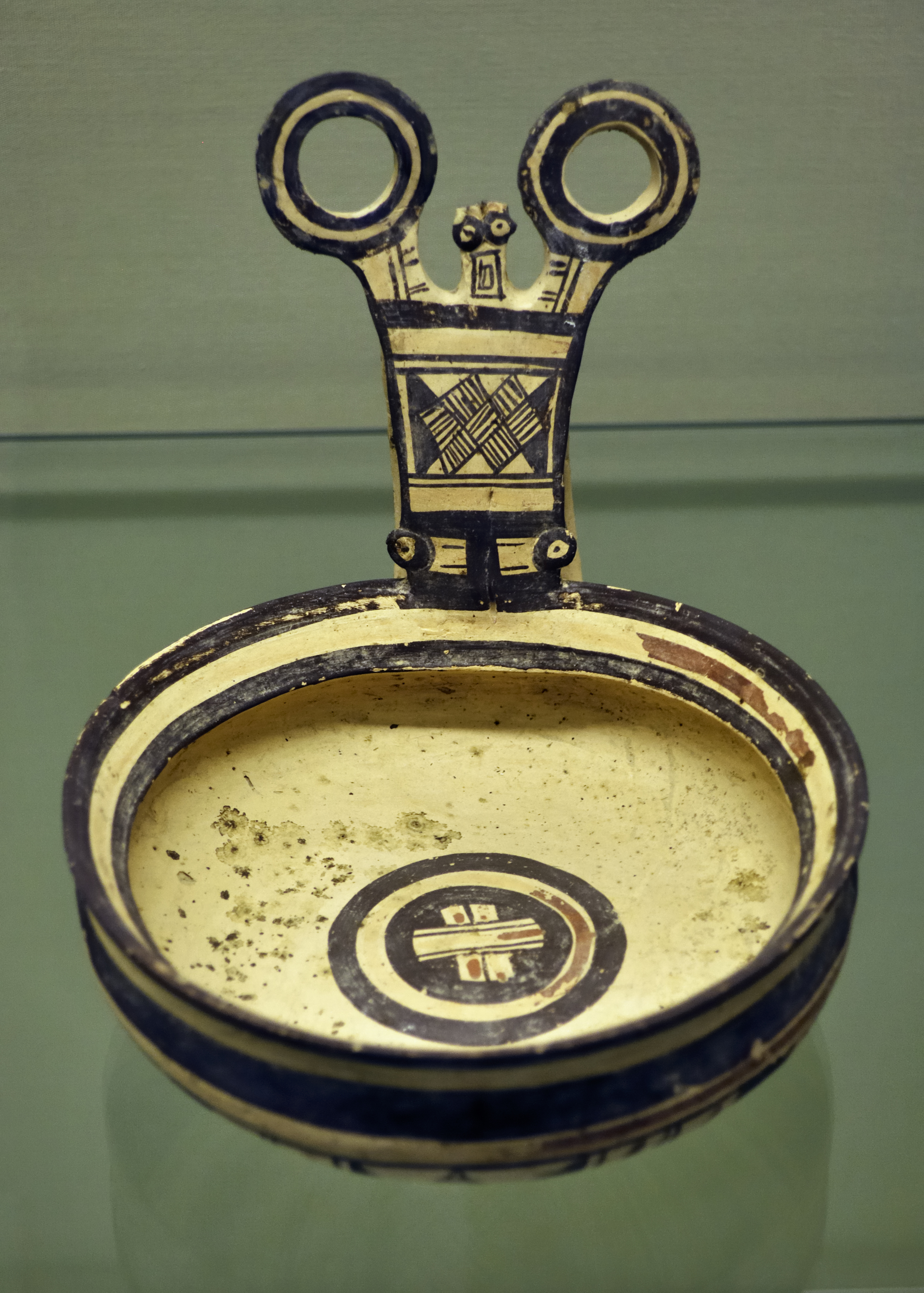
Daunian subgeometric Kyathos, 550–440 BC

A genetic study published in 2022 examined DNA extracted from three necropoleis: Ordona, Salapia and San Giovanni Rotondo, in the region of Apulia in southern Italy, which have been linked to the Daunian region during the Iron Age. Most samples from Ordona and Salapia date to the Daunian period and some samples from San Giovanni Rotondo date more broadly to the Iron Age. Paternal haplogroups of seven Iron Age samples were identified. Two paternal lineages of the Iron Age samples belong to J-M241, one of them could be further processed as J-L283+. Two Iron Age samples belonged to R-M269, one further designated as Z2103+ and one to I-M223.

Iron Age Daunians showed the highest autosomal affinity with Early Iron Age Illyrian populations from Croatia and populations that were formed in Italy in the Roman Republican era, which both can be broadly included in a pan-Mediterranean genetic continuum (stretching from Crete to Republican Rome and the Iberian Peninsula). Links to Minoans/Crete and Iron Age Greeks/Arkadia are less likely. A parsimonious explanation of the Daunian's origin favors a genetic continuity between the Daunians and the population that inhabited the area prior to the historical period that was analyzed, although additional influences from Croatia (ancient Illyria) cannot be excluded, as described by the material remains and the available historical sources.

=== Gauls ===
Laffranchi et al. 2024 examined 12 samples of Cenomani Cisalpine Gauls from Verona who lived between the 3rd and 1st centuries BCE. The five examples of individual Y-DNA extracted were determined to belong to either haplogroup I2a1b1a1b1 or subclades of R1b1a1b (R-M269). The 12 samples of mtDNA extracted belonged to various subclades of haplogroup H, T, U, K, J and X. Ancient samples from the central European Bell Beaker, Hallstatt and Tumulus cultures belonged to these haplogroups as well.

=== Etruscans ===
Genetic research has increasingly clarified the origins of the Etruscans. Early studies based on modern samples and mitochondrial DNA (mtDNA) alone yielded inconclusive or contradictory results. With the advent of ancient DNA analysis and whole genome sequencing (WGS), particularly since 2019, a clearer picture has emerged.

Genome-wide studies of Iron Age individuals from Tuscany and Lazio show that Etruscans were genetically similar to their Latin neighbors, despite linguistic differences. Both groups carried Steppe-related ancestry, introduced via migrations in the 2nd millennium BCE, likely associated with the Bell Beaker culture. A 2021 study found no signal of recent admixture from Anatolia or the Eastern Mediterranean, supporting the Etruscans' autochthonous origin. 75% of the Etruscan male individuals were found to belong to haplogroup haplogroup R1b (R1b M269), mostly represented by R1b-P312 and its derived R1b-L2 lineage (a descendant of R1b-U152) "that diffused across Europe alongside steppe-related ancestry in association with the Bell Beaker complex", while mtDNA was dominated by haplogroup H. Overall, Iron Age Etruscans from central Italy could be modelled as deriving 50% of their ancestry from Central European Bell Beakers (represented by Germany Bell Beaker), with around 25-30% steppe ancestry. Two Etruscan samples were modelled as having 80% Germany Bell Beaker ancestry.

A 2024 study on individuals from Tarquinia (9th–7th century BC) confirmed earlier results: ancestry was 84–92% Italy Bell Beaker with additional 8–26% Steppe admixture. Two males carried haplogroup J2b, and maternal haplogroups matched post-Neolithic European patterns. Physical traits included pale to intermediate skin tones, light/dark brown hair, blue and brown eyes.

Earlier mtDNA-only studies had suggested continuity between Etruscans, medieval, and modern Tuscans—especially in Casentino and Volterra—while rejecting a recent Near Eastern origin. A mtDNA 2007 study proposing such an origin based on modern Murlo samples has since been criticized.

Overall, ancient DNA supports the view that the Etruscans were a native population of central Italy, preserving local ancestry despite language retention from pre-Indo-European times.

=== Latins ===
A genetic study published in Science in November 2019 examined the remains of six Latin males buried near Rome between 900 BC and 200 BC. They carried the paternal haplogroups R-M269, T-L208, R-P311, R-PF7589 and R-P312 (two samples), and the maternal haplogroups H1aj1a, T2c1f, H2a, U4a1a, H11a and H10. These examined individuals were distinguished from preceding populations of Italy by the presence of 30% steppe ancestry. Two out of six individuals from Latin burials were found have a mixture of local Iron Age ancestry and ancestry from an Eastern Mediterranean population. Among modern populations, four out of six were closest to Northern and Central Italians, and then Spaniards, while the other two were closest to Southern Italians. Overall, the genetic differentiation between the Latins, Etruscans and the preceding proto-Villanovan population of Italy was found to be insignificant.

=== Nuragic civilization ===
A genetic study published in Nature Communications in February 2020 examined the remains of 17 individuals identified with Nuragic civilization. The samples of Y-DNA extracted belonged to haplogroup I2a1b1 (2 samples), R1b1b2a, G2a2b2b1a1, R1b1b (4 samples), J2b2a1 (3 samples) and G2a2b2b1a1a, while the samples of mtDNA extracted belonged to various types of haplogroup T, V, H, J, K and U. The study found strong evidence of genetic continuity between Nuragic civilization and earlier Neolithic inhabitants of Sardinia, who were genetically similar to Neolithic peoples of Iberia and southern France. They were determined to be of about 80% Early European Farmer (EEF) ancestry and 20% Western Hunter-Gatherer (WHG) ancestry. They were predicted to be largely descended from peoples of the Neolithic Cardial Ware culture, which spread throughout the western Mediterranean in Southern Europe c. 5500 BC. The Nuragic people were differentiated from many other Bronze Age peoples of Europe by the near absence of steppe-related ancestry.

A 2021 study by Villalba-Mouco et al. has identified a possible gene flow originating from the Italian Peninsula starting from the Chalcolithic. In prehistoric Sardinia, the component associated with Iranian farmers, or Caucasus-related ancestry, present in Mainland Italy since the Neolithic (together with the EEF and WHG components), gradually increases from 0% in the Early Chalcolithic to about 5.8% in the Bronze Age. The absence of the component linked to the Magdalenians would instead exclude contributions from the Chalcolithic of the south of the Iberian Peninsula. According to a 2022 study by Manjusha Chintalapati et al., "In Sardinia, a majority of the Bronze Age samples do not have Steppe pastoralist-related ancestry. In a few individuals, we found evidence for steppe ancestry", which would arrive in ~2600 BC.

Genetic data appears to support the hypothesis of a patrilocal society. In various sites, more genetic diversity was found in the mitochondrial DNA, suggesting that women may have moved from community to community more than the men.

=== Greeks and Punics ===
A genetic study published in Proceedings of the National Academy of Sciences of the United States of America in October 2023 examined the remains of 54 individuals from eighth- to fifth-century BC from the Greek Sicilian colony of Himera. The results suggest that the civilian population of Himera and the surrounding regions form a homogenous group, and are largely descended from the earlier Middle and Late Bronze Age Sicilians with minor admixtures from Iberia, the Caucasus, the Balkans and the Italian Peninsula. In contrast, the main group of Himeraean soldiers appear as intermediate between the local Sicilian population and a group related to Bronze Age Aegeans, suggesting that many soldiers were plausibly the descendants of the Greek colonizers of Sicily and that intermarriage between Greeks and Sicilian locals was practiced. The rest of the Himeraean army was made up of mercenaries with ancestral origins in northern Europe, the Steppe, and the Caucasus.

A genetic study published in Nature Communications in April 2025 examined the remains of 196 individuals from 14 sites traditionally identified as Phoenician and Punic, including ones in Sicily and Sardinia. The results suggest that during the earlier stages of the Phoenician colonization, the Punic demographic expansion was primarily driven by the spread of people with Sicilian-Aegean ancestry, while Levantine Phoenicians made little to no genetic contribution to Punic settlements in the central and western Mediterranean. The North African ancestry became widespread only after 400 BCE in the Punic world, suggesting that expanding Carthaginian influence facilitated this spread. However, this was a minority contributor of ancestry in all of the sampled sites, including in Carthage itself.

=== Picentes ===
A 2024 study analysed the Ancient DNA of 71 Iron Age Picene individuals from the necropoleis of Novilara and Sirolo-Numana.

Genome analysis showed that the two Picene groups are genetically homogeneous and in continuity with earlier cultures. Moreover, despite an overall genetic similarity among Iron Age Italic populations, the analysis revealed small but significant differences in their genetics. In particular, the Adriatic populations (Picentes and Daunians) display a greater proportion of a genetic component deriving from the Pontic–Caspian steppe than the Tyrrhenian populations—the Etruscans and the Latins.

The principal genetic ancestries of the two Picene groups consist of components from the Anatolian Neolithic or Early European Farmers and from Eastern Hunter-Gatherers (EHG)/Yamnaya (also known as Western Steppe Herders); together these account for 90% of their genetic heritage. In addition, despite the overall genetic homogeneity of populations belonging to the Picene culture, some individuals show non-local ancestries. This evidence, together with data for other contemporary peoples, suggests that the Iron Age (or the immediately preceding period) was characterized by intense population movements and marked the beginning of a cosmopolitan society in Italy.

Two main paternal haplogroups are observed among the Picenes, namely R1b-M269/L23 (58% of the total) and J2-M172/M12 (25% of the total), which may represent direct links with Central Europe and the Balkan Peninsula.

Finally, phenotype analysis shows that individuals associated with the Picene culture possessed lighter pigmentation than contemporary peoples. A higher frequency of blond hair and blue eyes occurs among the Picenes when compared with the Etruscans, Latins, and Daunians.

=== Lombards ===
A genetic study published in Nature Communications in September 2018 found strong genetic similarities between Lombards of Italy and earlier Lombards of Central Europe. Lombard males were primarily carriers of subclades of haplogroup R1b and I2a2a1, both of which are common among Germanic peoples. Lombard males were found to be more genetically homogeneous than Lombard females. The evidence suggested that the Lombards originated in Central/Northern Europe, and were a patriarchal people who settled Central Europe and then later Italy through a migration from the north.

A genetic study published in Science Advances in September 2018 examined the remains of a Lombard male buried at an Alemannic graveyard. He was found to be a carrier of the paternal haplogroup R1b1a2a1a1c2b2b and the maternal haplogroup H65a. The graveyard also included the remains of a Frankish and a Byzantine male, both of whom were also carriers of subclades of the paternal haplogroup R1b1a2a1a1. The Lombard, Frankish and Byzantine males were all found to be closely related, and displayed close genetic links to Northern Europe, particularly Lithuania and Iceland.

A genetic study published in the European Journal of Human Genetics in January 2019 examined the mtDNA of a large number of early-medieval Lombard remains from Central Europe and Italy. These individuals were found to be closely related and displayed strong genetic links to Central Europe. The evidence suggested that the Lombard settlement of Italy was the result of a migration from the north involving both males and females.

=== Moors ===
A genetic study published in PubMed in July 2024 analyzed burials at the site of Segesta to investigate the interactions between Muslim and Christian communities during the Middle Ages in Sicily. While individuals buried in the Christian cemetery resemble modern populations from Eastern, Southern, Southeastern and Western Europe, showing continuity with the ancient Sicilian Iron Age individuals, and carry uniparental haplotypes primarily found today in Western Europe, the individuals buried in the Muslim cemetery carry haplotypes associated with North African and the Eastern Mediterranean populations and in genome-wide analysis fall within the space represented by Europe, the Near East and North Africa, except for one male who falls within the diversity of sub-Saharan African populations. In conclusion, the biomolecular and Isotopic results suggest the Christians remained genetically distinct from the Muslim community at Segesta while following a substantially similar diet. Based on these results, the authours suggest that the two communities at Segesta followed strong endogamy rules.

== Y-DNA genetic diversity ==
Distribution of the R1b haplogroup in Europe

Many Italians, especially in Northern Italy and Central Italy, belong to Haplogroup R1b (R-M269), common in Western and Central Europe. The highest frequency of R1b is found in Garfagnana (76.2%) in Tuscany and in the Bergamo Valleys (80.8%) in Lombardy. This percentage lowers in the south of Italy in Calabria (33.2%).

A 2007 study from the Università Cattolica del Sacro Cuore found that while Greek colonization left little significant genetic contribution, data analysis sampling 12 sites in the Italian peninsula supported a male demic diffusion model and Neolithic admixture with Mesolithic inhabitants. The results supported a distribution of genetic variation along a north–south axis and supported demic diffusion. South Italian samples clustered with southeast and south-central European samples, and northern groups with West Europe.

A study by Boattini et al. (2013) analyzed uniparental markers (Y-chromosome and mtDNA) in approximately 900 individuals from 8 Italian macro-regions and 23 different Italian locations: three in Northern Italy, two in Central Italy, one in Southern Italy, and two in the islands (Sicily and Sardinia). Contrary to previous hypotheses of a North-South genetic gradient, the results reveal a sex-biased genetic structure, with a clear differentiation in paternal lineages (Y-chromosome) between a Northwestern cluster, including Northern Italy and Tuscany, and a Southeastern cluster, encompassing Southern Italy and the Adriatic coast. In contrast, mtDNA variation appears more homogeneous, with slight evidence of clinal distribution. Sardinia stands out for its pronounced genetic isolation, characterized by the dominance of the Y-DNA haplogroup I2-M26, which accounts for the majority of the island's paternal lineages. Among the identified Y-DNA haplogroups, R1b-M269, with the clade R1b-U152, predominates in the North and Tuscany; J2, with J2a-M410, and E1b1b, with E-V13, are more frequent in the South, Sicily, and along the Adriatic coast; I2-M223, G2a-P15, J2b-M102 are still significant, while less common haplogroups such as T-M70, appear in low frequencies.

Heraclides et al. (2017) found haplogroup J-M172 in 8.6% of Northern Italians and 19.6% of Central Italians. It is also found at notable frequencies in Sicilians (22.3%), Southern Italians (19.7%) and Sardinians (9.6%).

A 2018 genetic study, focusing on the Y-chromosome and haplogroups lineages, their diversity and their distribution by taking some 817 representative subjects, gives credit to the traditional northern-southern division in population, by concluding that due to Neolithic migrations southern Italians "show a higher similarity with Middle Eastern and Southern Balkan populations than northern ones; conversely, northern samples are genetically closer to North-West Europe and Northern Balkan groups". The position of Volterra in central Tuscany keeps the debate about the origins of Etruscans open, although the numbers are strongly in favor of the autochthonous thesis: the low presence of J2a-M67* (2.7%) suggests contacts by sea with Anatolian people; the presence of Central European lineage G2a-L497 (7.1%) at considerable frequency would rather support a Central European origin of the Etruscans; and finally, the high incidence of European R1b lineages (R1b 50% approx., R1b-U152 20%-40%) — especially of haplogroup R1b-U152 — could suggest an autochthonous origin due to a process of formation of the Etruscan civilisation from the preceding Villanovan culture, following the theories of Dionysius of Halicarnassus, as already supported by archaeology, anthropology and linguistics. In 2019, in a Stanford study published in Science, two ancient samples from the Neolithic settlement of Ripabianca di Monterado in province of Ancona, in the Marche region of Italy, were found to be Y-DNA J-L26 and J-M304. Therefore, Y-DNA J2a-M67, downstream to Y-DNA J-L26 and J-M304, has most likely been in Italy since the Neolithic and can't be the proof of recent contacts with Anatolia.

== Y-DNA introduced by historical immigration ==
In two villages in Lazio and Abruzzo (Cappadocia and Vallepietra), I1 is the most common Y-DNA, recorded at levels 35% and 28%, this is likely due to a founder effect. In Sicily, further migrations from the Vandals and Saracens have only slightly affected the ethnic composition of the Sicilian people. However, specifically Greek genetic legacy is estimated at 37% in Sicily.

The Norman conquest of southern Italy caused the Norman Kingdom of Sicily to be created in 1130, with Palermo as capital, 70 years after the initial Norman invasion and 40 after the conquest of the last town, Noto in 1091, and would last until 1198. Nowadays it is in central and western Sicily, that Norman Y-DNA is common, with 15% to 20% of the lineages belonging to haplogroup I, this percentage drops to 8% in the eastern part of the island. The Medieval Moorish male contribution to Sicily was estimated at 3,75%. Overall, the estimated Southern Balkan and Western European paternal contributions in Sicily are about 63% and 26% respectively. The North African haplogroup E-M81 shows an average frequency of 1.53% in the current Sicilian and Southern Italian genetic pool, but the typical Maghrebin core haplotype 13-14-30-24-9-11-13 has been found in only two out of the five E-M81 individuals.

A 2015 genetic study of six small mountain villages in eastern Lazio and one mountain community in nearby western Abruzzo found some genetic similarities between these communities and Near Eastern populations, mainly in the male genetic pool. Bulgars led by Alcek settled in Sepino, Bojano, and Isernia. These Bulgars preserved their speech and identity until the late 8th century. The Y haplogroup Q, common in Western Asia and Central Asia, was also found among this sample population, suggesting that in the past could have hosted a settlement from Anatolia. Also, it is about 0.6% in continental Italy, but it rises to 2.5% (6/236) in Sicily, where it reaches 16.7% (3/18) in Mazara del Vallo region, followed by 7.1% (2/28) in Ragusa, 3.6% in Sciacca, and 3.7% in Belvedere Marittimo.

== Genetic composition of Italian mtDNA ==
In Italy as elsewhere in Europe the majority of mtDNA lineages belong to the haplogroup H. Several independent studies conclude that haplogroup H probably evolved in West Asia c. 25,000 years ago. It was carried to Europe by migrations c. 20–25,000 years ago, and spread with population of the southwest of the continent. Its arrival was roughly contemporary with the rise of the Gravettian culture. The spread of subclades H1, H3 and the sister haplogroup V reflect a second intra-European expansion from the Franco-Cantabrian region after the last glacial maximum, c. 13,000 years ago.

Recent studies have shown that Italy played an important role in the recovery of "Western Europe" at the end of the Last glacial period. The study which was focused on the mitochondrial U5b3 haplogroup discovered that this female lineage had in fact originated in Italy and around 10,000 years ago it expanded from the Peninsula towards Provence and the Balkans. In Provence, probably between 9,000 and 7,000 years ago, it gave rise to the haplogroup subclade U5b3a1. This subclade U5b3a1 later came from Provence to the island of Sardinia by way of obsidian merchants, because it is estimated that 80% of the obsidian which is found in France comes from Monte Arci in Sardinia, reflecting the close relationship which once existed between these two regions. Still about 4% of the female population of Sardinia belongs to this haplotype.

A 2013 study by Alessio Boattini et al. found 0 of African L haplogroup in the whole Italy out of 865 samples. The percentages for Berber M1 and U6 haplogroups were 0.46% and 0.35%, respectively. A 2014 study by Stefania Sarno et al. found 0 of African L and M1 haplogroups in mainland Southern Italy out of 115 samples. Only two Berber U6 out of 115 samples were found, one from Lecce and one from Cosenza.

A close genetic similarity between Ashkenazim and Italians has been noted in genetic studies, possibly due to the fact that Ashkenazi Jews have a significant European admixture (30–60%), much of it Southern European, a lot of which came from Southern Italy when Jewish diaspora males of Middle Eastern origin migrated to Europe and found wives among local women who then converted to Judaism. More specifically, Ashkenazi Jews could be modeled as being 50% Levantine and 50% European, with an estimated mean South European admixture of 37.5%. Most of it (30.5%) seems to derive from a Southern Italian source.

A 2017 analysis of maternal haplogroups from ancient and modern samples indicated a substantial genetic similarity among the modern inhabitants of Central Italy and the area's ancient pre-Roman inhabitants of Picene settlement of Novilara in the province of Pesaro, and evidence of substantial genetic continuity in the region from pre-Roman times to the present with regard to mitochondrial DNA.

A mtDNA study, published in 2018 in the journal American Journal of Physical Anthropology, compared ancient and modern samples from Tuscany, from prehistory, the Etruscan age and Roman age, Renaissance, and present-day samples. The study concluded that the Etruscans appear as a local population, intermediate between the prehistoric and the other samples, placing in the temporal network between the Eneolithic Age and the Roman Age. A very large mtDNA study from 2013 indicates, based on maternally-inherited DNA from 30 bone samples taken from tombs dating from the eight century to the first century BC from Tuscany and Lazio, that the Etruscans were a native population. The ancient (30 Etruscans, 27 Medieval Tuscans) and modern DNA sequences (370 Tuscans) show that the Etruscans can be considered ancestral to Medieval and, especially in the subpopulations from Casentino and Volterra, of modern Tuscans. These results are largely in line with a previous genetic study from 2004 based on mitochondrial DNA (mtDNA) from 28 bone samples taken from tombs dating from the seventh century to the third century BC from Veneto, Tuscany, Lazio and Campania. This study found that the ancient DNA extracted from the Etruscan remains had some affinities with modern European populations including Germans, English people from Cornwall, and Tuscans in Italy.

A genetic analysis of maternal haplogroups published in 2018 examined DNA extracted from 15 Iron Age (7th – 4th c. BCE) and 30 Roman period (1st – 4th c. CE) individuals buried at Iron Age Botromagno and Roman period Vagnari, now part of Gravina in Puglia. The study supports previous hypotheses that the ancestors of the Iron Age Iapygians may have originated in the eastern Balkan region, or derive shared ancestry with a common source population from eastern Europe, and suggests that as the Romans occupied the region, they populated their Imperial properties with people from central Italy (possibly from the region of Latium, and the surrounding environs of Rome).

A 2020 analysis of maternal haplogroups from ancient and modern samples in the central Italian region of Umbria finds a substantial genetic similarity among modern Umbrians and the area's pre-Roman inhabitants, and evidence of substantial genetic continuity in the region from pre-Roman times to the present. Both modern and ancient Umbrians were found to have high rates of mtDNA haplogroups U4 and U5a, and an overrepresentation of J (at roughly 30%). The study also found that, "local genetic continuities are further attested to by six terminal branches (H1e1, J1c3, J2b1, U2e2a, U8b1b1 and K1a4a)" also shared by ancient and modern Umbrians.

== Autosomal ==
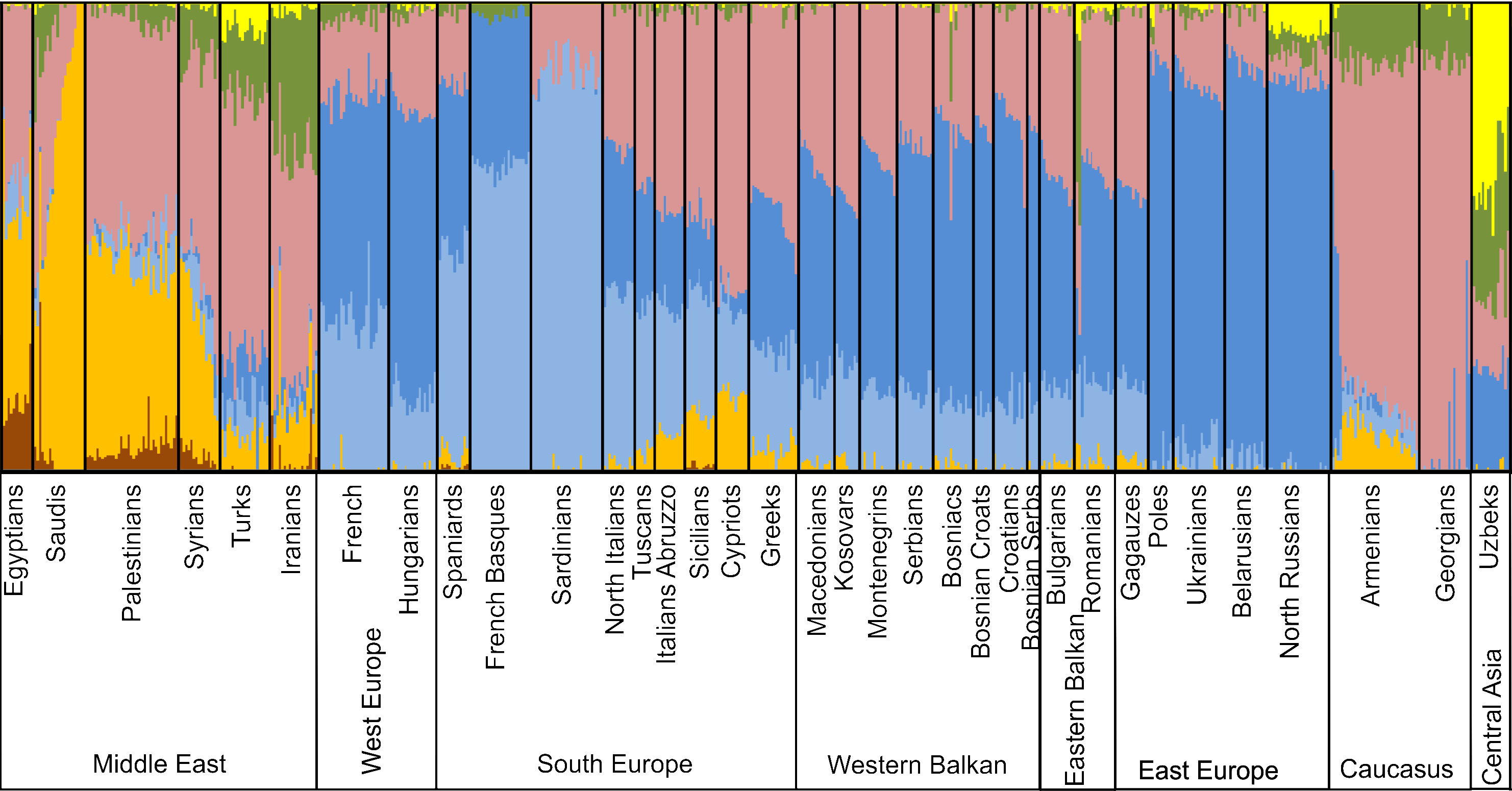
Admixture plots of modern West Eurasian populations based on seven components: South/West European North/East European Caucasus West Asian South Asian East Asian North African/Sub-Saharan African

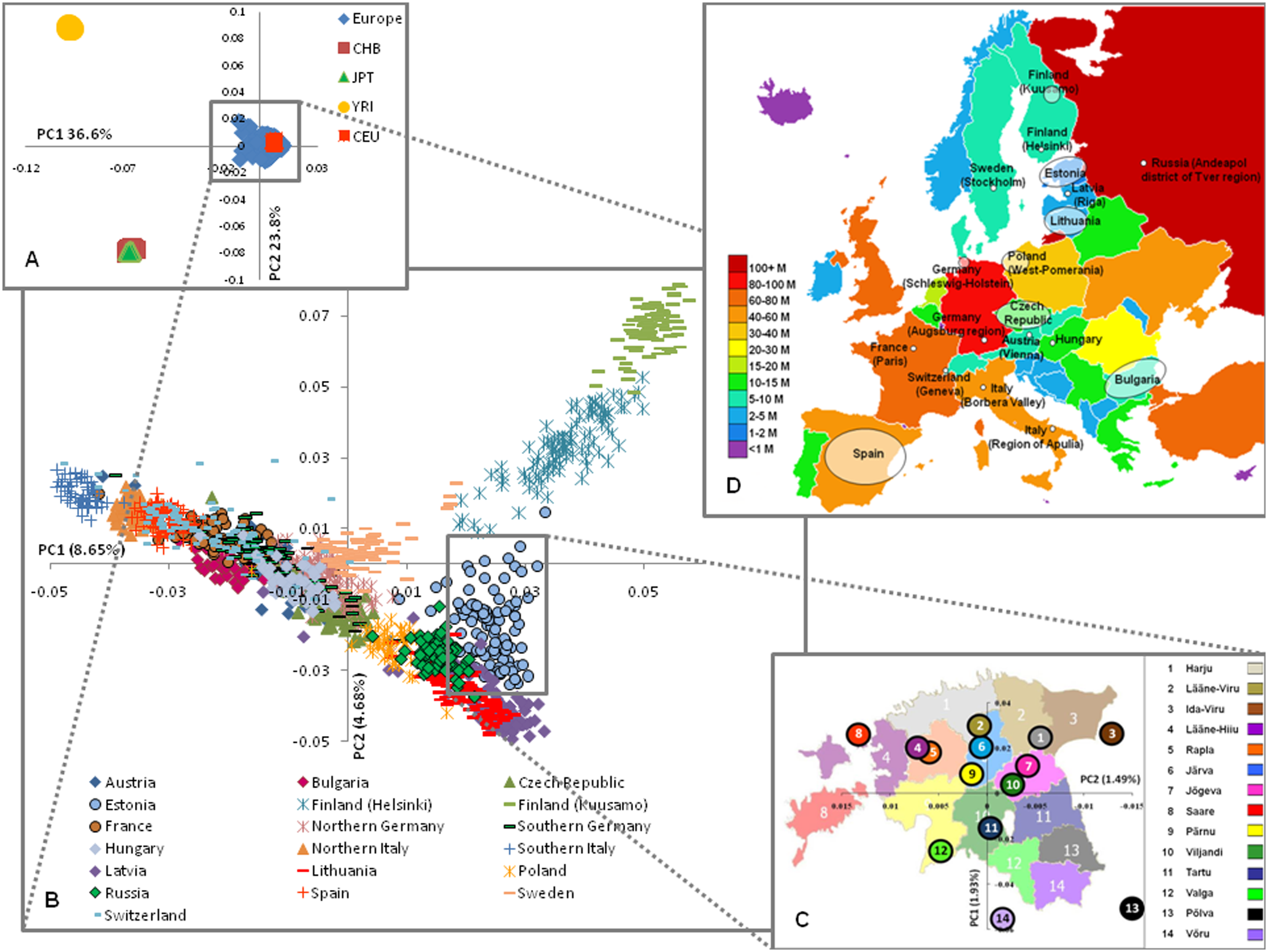
The European genetic structure (based on 273,464 SNPs). Three levels of structure as revealed by PC analysis are shown: A) inter-continental; B) intra-continental; and C) inside a single country (Estonia), where median values of the PC1&2 are shown. D) European map illustrating the origin of sample and population size. CEU – Utah residents with ancestry from Northern and Western Europe, CHB – Han Chinese from Beijing, JPT – Japanese from Tokyo, and YRI – Yoruba from Ibadan, Nigeria.

Wade et al. (2008) determined that Italy is one of the last two remaining genetic islands in Europe, the other being Finland. This is due in part to the presence of the Alpine mountain chain which, over the centuries, has prevented large migration flows.

Recent genome-wide studies have been able to detect and quantify admixture like never before. Li et al. (2008), using more than 600,000 autosomal SNPs, identify seven global population clusters, including European, Middle Eastern and Central/South Asian. All the Italian samples belong to Central-Western group with minor influences dating to Neolithic period.

López Herráez et al. (2009) typed the same samples at close to 1 million SNPs and analyzed them in a Western Eurasian context, identifying a number of subclusters. This time, all of the European samples show some minor admixture. Among the Italians, Tuscany still has the most, and Sardinia has a bit too, but so does Lombardy (Bergamo), which is even farther north.

A 2011 study by Moorjani et al. found that many southern Europeans have inherited 1–3% Sub-Saharan ancestry, although the percentages were lower (0.2–2.1%) when reanalyzed with the 'STRUCTURE' statistical model. An average admixture date of around 55 generations/1100 years ago was also calculated, "consistent with North African gene flow at the end of the Roman Empire and subsequent Arab migrations"

A 2012 study by Di Gaetano et al. used 1,014 Italians with wide geographical coverage. It showed that the current population of Sardinia can be clearly differentiated genetically from mainland Italy and Sicily, and that a certain degree of genetic differentiation is detectable within the current Italian peninsula population.

By using the ADMIXTURE software, the authors obtained at K = 4 the lowest cross-validation error. The HapMap CEU individuals showed an average Northern Europe (NE) ancestry of 83%. A similar pattern is observed in French, Northern Italian and Central Italian populations with a NE ancestry of 70%, 56% and 52% respectively. According to the PCA plot, also in the ADMIXTURE analysis there are relatively small differences in ancestry between Northern Italians and Central Italians while Southern Italians showed a lower average admixture NE proportion (44%) than Northern and Central Italy, and a higher Caucasian ancestry of 28%. The Sardinian samples display a pattern of crimson common to the others European populations but at a higher frequency (70%). The average admixture proportions for Northern European ancestry within current Sardinian population is 14.3% with some individuals exhibiting very low Northern European ancestry (less than 5% in 36 individuals on 268 accounting the 13% of the sample).

A 2013 study by Peristera Paschou et al. confirms that the Mediterranean Sea has acted as a strong barrier to gene flow through geographic isolation following initial settlements. Samples from (Northern) Italy, Tuscany, Sicily and Sardinia are closest to other Southern Europeans from Iberia, the Balkans and Greece, who are in turn closest to the Neolithic migrants that spread farming throughout Europe, represented here by the Cappadocian sample from Anatolia. But there hasn't been any significant admixture from the Middle East or North Africa into Italy and the rest of Southern Europe since then.

Ancient DNA analysis reveals that Ötzi the Iceman clusters with modern Southern Europeans and closest to Italians (the orange "Europe S" dots in the plots below), especially those from the island of Sardinia. Other Italians pull away toward Southeastern and Central Europe consistent with geography and some post-Neolithic gene flow from those areas (e.g. Italics, Greeks, Etruscans, Celts), but despite that and centuries of history, they're still very similar to their prehistoric ancestor.

A 2013 study by Botigué et al. 2013 applied an unsupervised clustering algorithm, ADMIXTURE, to estimate allele-based sharing between Africans and Europeans. Regarding Italians, the North African ancestry does not exceed 2% of their genomes. On average, 1% of Jewish ancestry is found in Tuscan HapMap population and Italian Swiss, as well as Greeks and Cypriots. Contrary to past observations, Sub-Saharan ancestry is detected at <1% in Europe, with the exception of the Canary Islands.

Haak et al. (2015) conducted a genome wide study of 94 ancient skeletons from Europe and Russia. The study argues that Bronze Age steppe pastoralists from the Yamna culture spread Indo-European languages in Europe. Autosomic tests indicate that the Yamnaya-people were the result of admixture between two different hunter-gatherer populations: Eastern Hunter-Gatherers from the Russian Steppe and either Caucasus Hunter-Gatherers or Chalcolithic Iranians (who are very similar). Wolfgang Haak estimated a 27% ancestral contribution of the Yamnaya in the DNA of modern Tuscans, a 25% ancestral contribution of the Yamnaya in the DNA of modern Northern Italians from Bergamo, excluding Sardinians (7%), and to a lesser extent Sicilians (12%).

A 2016 study Sazzini et al., confirms the results of previous studies by Di Gaetano et al. (2012) and Fiorito et al. (2015) but has much better geographical coverage of samples, with 737 individuals from 20 locations in 15 different regions being tested. The study also for the first time includes a formal admixture test that models the ancestry of Italians by inferring admixture events using all of the Western Eurasian samples. The results are very interesting in light of the ancient DNA evidence that has come out in the last couple years:

In addition to the pattern described in the main text, the SARD sample seemed to have played a major role as source of admixture for most of the examined populations, especially Italian ones, rather than as recipient of migratory processes. In fact, the most significant f3 scores for trios including SARD indicated peninsular Italians as plausible results of admixture between SARD and populations from Iran, Caucasus and Russia. This scenario could be interpreted as further evidence that Sardinians retain high proportions of a putative ancestral genomic background that was considerably widespread across Europe at least until the Neolithic and that has been subsequently erased or masked in most of present-day European populations.

Sarno et al. (2017) concentrate on the genetic impact brought by the historical migrations around the Mediterranean on Southern Italy and Sicily, and conclude that the "results demonstrate that the genetic variability of present-day Southern Italian populations is characterized by a shared genetic continuity, extending to large portions of central and eastern Mediterranean shores", while showing that "Southern Italy appear more similar to the Greek-speaking islands of the Mediterranean Sea, reaching as far east as Cyprus, than to samples from continental Greece, suggesting a possible ancestral link which might have survived in a less admixed form in the islands", also precises how "besides a predominant Neolithic-like component, our analyses reveal significant impacts of Post-Neolithic Caucasus- and Levantine-related ancestries." A news article associated with the Max Planck Society, reviewing the results, while beginning by stating that "populations along the eastern Mediterranean coast share a genetic heritage that transcends nationality", also points out how this study is interesting on the debates concerning the diffusion of the Indo-European languages family in Europe, as, while showcasing the influence from the Caucasus, there's no genetic marker associated with the Pontic–Caspian steppe, "a very characteristic genetic signal well represented in North-Central and Eastern Europe, which previous studies associated with the introduction of Indo-European languages to the continent."

Raveane et al. (2019) analyzed an extensive genomic dataset, including 1,616 individuals from all 20 Italian administrative regions, as well as ancient and modern samples from Europe and the Mediterranean. A sharp north-south division in cluster distribution was detected, with the separation between northern and southern areas shifted northward along the peninsula. The study identified three main genetic clusters in Italy: Northern Italy (including Northern Italy and Tuscany), Southern Italy (including Central-Southern regions, the South, and Sicily), and Sardinia. It discovered in a genome-wide study on modern-day Italians a contribution of Caucasus Hunter-Gatherers from the third millennium Anatolian Bronze Age, predominantly in Southern Italy. Furthermore, patterns of regional variation showed geographical structure in Southern Italy, Northern Italy, and Sardinia, in line with previous studies. Even more detailed structure was observed between subregional clusters, caused by geography and distance, and historical admixture possibly associated with events at the end of the Roman Empire and during subsequent periods.

Antonio et al. (2019) studied historical populations from various time periods in Latium and Rome. They found that, despite the linguistic differences, the Latins and the Etruscans showed no significant genetic differences. Their autosomal DNA was a mixture in similar proportions of Western Hunter-Gatherers (Mesolithic), Early European Farmers (Neolithic), and Western Steppe Herders (Bronze Age).

A 2022 genome-wide study of more than 700 individuals from the South Mediterranean area (102 from Southern Italy), combined with ancient DNA from neighbouring areas, found high affinities of South-Eastern Italians with modern Eastern Peloponnesians, and a closer affinity of ancient Greek genomes with those from specific regions of South Italy than modern Greek genomes. The study also discovered common genetic sources shared between South Italy and Peloponnese, which can be modeled as a mixture of Anatolian Neolithic and Iranian Chalcolithic ancestries.

A 2023 study examined the Balkan samples from the Roman era, finding surprisingly little ancestry contribution from peoples of Italic descent. (Note: Olalde; et al. (2023-12-07) [received 2023-06-23]. "A genetic history of the Balkans from Roman frontier to Slavic migrations". Cell. 186 (25): 5472–5485. doi:10.1016/j.cell.2023.10.018. eISSN 1097-4172. PMC 10752003. PMID 38065079. Preprint published as Olalde; et al. (2021-09-04). "Cosmopolitanism at the Roman Danubian Frontier, Slavic Migrations, and the Genomic Formation of Modern Balkan Peoples". bioRxiv 10.1101/2021.08.30.458211v1. Academic commentary:. Community commentary:˙˙˙˙˙˙˙˙˙˙˙˙˙˙. News:.)

Baker et al. (2024) used implement typology to divide the Gravettian technocomplex into nine distinct groups, including two closely related groups in Italy, comparing these with the archaeogenetic evidence, (Note: Baker, Jack; Courtenay, Lloyd A.; d'Errico, Francesco; Rigaud, Solange; Pereira, Daniel (2024-01-29) [received 2023-04-26]. "Evidence from personal ornaments suggest nine distinct cultural groups between 34,000 and 24,000 years ago in Europe". Nature Human Behaviour. 8 (3): 431–444. doi:10.1038/s41562-023-01803-6. eISSN 2397-3374. PMID 38287173. Academic commentary:. Community commentary:. News:˙˙˙˙˙.) most notably from Allentoft et al. (2022). (Note: Allentoft, Morten E.; Altinkaya, Isin; et al. (2024-01-11) [received 2022-05-02]. "Population genomics of post-glacial western Eurasia". Nature. 625 (7994): 301–311. Bibcode:2024Natur.625..301A. doi:10.1038/s41586-023-06865-0. eISSN 1476-4687. PMC 10781627. PMID 38200295. Preprint first published as Allentoft, Morten E.; Sikora, Martin; Refoyo-Martínez, Alba; Irving-Pease, Evan K.; Fischer, Anders; Barrie, William; Ingason, Andrés; Stenderup, Jesper; Sjögren, Karl-Göran; Pearson, Alice; Sousa Da Mota, Bárbara; Schulz Paulsson, Bettina; Halgren, Alma; MacLeod, Ruairidh; Jørkov, Marie Louise Schjellerup; Demeter, Fabrice; Sørensen, Lasse; Nielsen, Poul Otto; Henriksen, Rasmus A.; Vimala, Tharsika; McColl, Hugh; Margaryan, Ashot; Ilardo, Melissa; Vaughn, Andrew; Fischer Mortensen, Morten; Nielsen, Anne Birgitte; Ulfeldt Hede, Mikkel; Johannsen, Niels Nørkjær; Rasmussen, Peter; Vinner, Lasse; et al. (2024). "Population genomics of post-glacial western Eurasia". Nature. 625 (7994): 301–311. Bibcode:2024Natur.625..301A. bioRxiv 10.1101/2022.05.04.490594v1. doi:10.1038/s41586-023-06865-0. PMC 10781627. PMID 38200295. Data:˙˙. Academic commentary:˙. Community commentary:˙˙˙˙˙˙˙˙˙˙˙˙˙. News:˙˙˙˙˙.: Split off from the above paper: Pease, Irving; et al. (2024-01-11) [received 2022-09-17]. "The selection landscape and genetic legacy of ancient Eurasians". Nature. 625 (7994): 312–320. Bibcode:2024Natur.625..312I. doi:10.1038/s41586-023-06705-1. eISSN 1476-4687. PMC 10781624. PMID 38200293.)

A 2024 study analysed the genomic ancestry and social dynamics of Western Hunter-Gatherers, including several from Italy. (Note: Alaçamlı, Erkin; Bernhardsson, Carolina; Bouquin, Denis; Chetty, Darshan; Dina, Christian; Edlund, Hanna; Garmond, Nicolas; Günther, Torsten; Jakobsson, Mattias; Marchand, Grégor; Simões, Luciana G.; Peyroteo-Stjerna, Rita (2024-02-26). "Genomic ancestry and social dynamics of the last hunter-gatherers of Atlantic France". Proceedings of the National Academy of Sciences. 121 (10) e2310545121. Bibcode:2024PNAS..12110545S. doi:10.1073/pnas.2310545121. eISSN 1091-6490. PMC 10927518. PMID 38408241. Data:. Academic commentary:. Community commentary:˙˙˙. News:˙˙˙˙.)

Another 2024 study sequenced human-animal co-burials from the Late Iron Age necropolis of the Seminario Vescovile in Verona.

== See also ==
- Demographics of Italy
- European ethnic groups
- Genetic history of Europe

== Sources ==
- Amorim, Carlos Eduardo G. (11 September 2018). "Understanding 6th-century barbarian social organization and migration through paleogenomics". Nature Communications. 9 (3547) 3547. Nature Research. Bibcode:2018NatCo...9.3547A. bioRxiv 10.1101/268250. doi:10.1038/s41467-018-06024-4. PMC 6134036. PMID 30206220.
- Aneli, Serena; Saupe, Tina; Montinaro, Francesco; Solnik, Anu; Molinaro, Ludovica; Scaggion, Cinzia; Carrara, Nicola; Raveane, Alessandro; Kivisild, Toomas; Metspalu, Mait; Scheib, Christiana; Pagani, Luca (2022). "The genetic origin of Daunians and the Pan-Mediterranean southern Italian Iron Age context". Molecular Biology and Evolution. 39 (2) msac014. doi:10.1093/molbev/msac014. PMC 8826970. PMID 35038748.
- Heraclides, Alexandros; Bashiardes, Evy; Fernández-Domínguez, Eva; Bertoncini, Stefania; Chimonas, Marios; Christofi, Vasilis; King, Jonathan; Budowle, Bruce; Manoli, Panayiotis; Cariolou, Marios A. (2017). "Y-chromosomal analysis of Greek Cypriots reveals a primarily common pre-Ottoman paternal ancestry with Turkish Cypriots". PLOS ONE. 12 (6) e0179474. Bibcode:2017PLoSO..1279474H. doi:10.1371/journal.pone.0179474. ISSN 1932-6203. PMC 5473566. PMID 28622394.
- Marcus, Joseph H.; et al. (February 24, 2020). "Genetic history from the Middle Neolithic to present on the Mediterranean island of Sardinia". Nature Communications. 11 (939). Nature Research: 939. Bibcode:2020NatCo..11..939M. doi:10.1038/s41467-020-14523-6. PMC 7039977. PMID 32094358.
- O'Sullivan, Niall (September 9, 2018). "Ancient genome-wide analyses infer kinship structure in an Early Medieval Alemannic graveyard". Science Advances. 4 (9) eaao1262. American Association for the Advancement of Science. Bibcode:2018SciA....4.1262O. doi:10.1126/sciadv.aao1262. PMC 6124919. PMID 30191172.
- Saupe, Tina; et al. (2021-06-21). "Ancient genomes reveal structural shifts after the arrival of Steppe-related ancestry in the Italian Peninsula". Current Biology. 31 (12): 2576–2591.e12. Bibcode:2021CBio...31E2576S. doi:10.1016/j.cub.2021.04.022. hdl:11585/827581. ISSN 0960-9822. PMID 33974848. S2CID 234471370.
- Vai, Stefania (19 January 2019). "A genetic perspective on Longobard-Era migrations". European Journal of Human Genetics. 27 (4). Nature Research: 647–656. doi:10.1038/s41431-018-0319-8. PMC 6460631. PMID 30651584.
