= Melanotic neuroectodermal tumor of infancy =

- Other names: MNTI
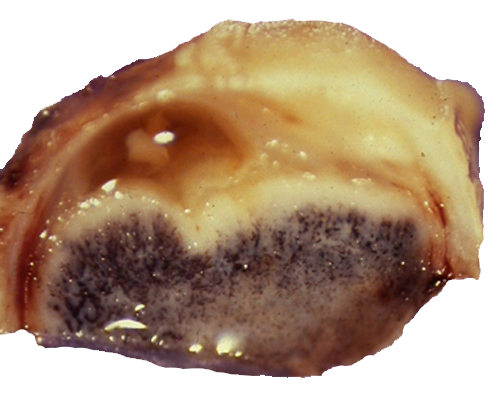
- A bone resection sample showing the pigmentation below the surface in a melanotic neuroectodermal tumor of infancy
- Specialty: Oncology

Melanotic neuroectodermal tumor of infancy is a very rare oral cavity tumor that is seen in patients usually at or around birth. It must be removed to be cured. Definitions: A rare, biphasic, neuroblastic, and pigmented epithelial neoplasm of craniofacial sites, usually involving the oral cavity or gums.

== Signs and symptoms ==
Most patients present with a very rapidly growing mass that often gives a bluish appearance in the mouth. This is because the pigmentation in the cells appears blue through the overlying epithelium (mucosa). By imaging studies, there is usually a large expansive radiolucent (clear) mass without well defined borders. Calcifications within the mass may be seen. More than 70% involve the maxilla (usually maxillary anterior alveolar ridge), while the mandible and skull are affected less often. There is often an elevated vanilmandelic acid level.

== Pathogenesis ==
It is considered to be a developmental anomaly, and thus is congenital in presentation. It is thought to be derived from neural crest, which is one of the embryologic tissue types. The reason for this postulation is based on the expression of melanotransferrin (melanoma-specific peptide that may play role in iron metabolism).

== Diagnosis ==
=== Macroscopic ===
Usually there is a smooth, firm mass, with mottled white-gray to blue-black cut surfaces. The overall size ranges from 1–10 cm with a mean size 3.5 cm.

=== Microscopic ===
The tumor is usually very well circumscribed but not encapsulated. There are two cell types present (biphasic), arranged in alveolar or tubular configurations.

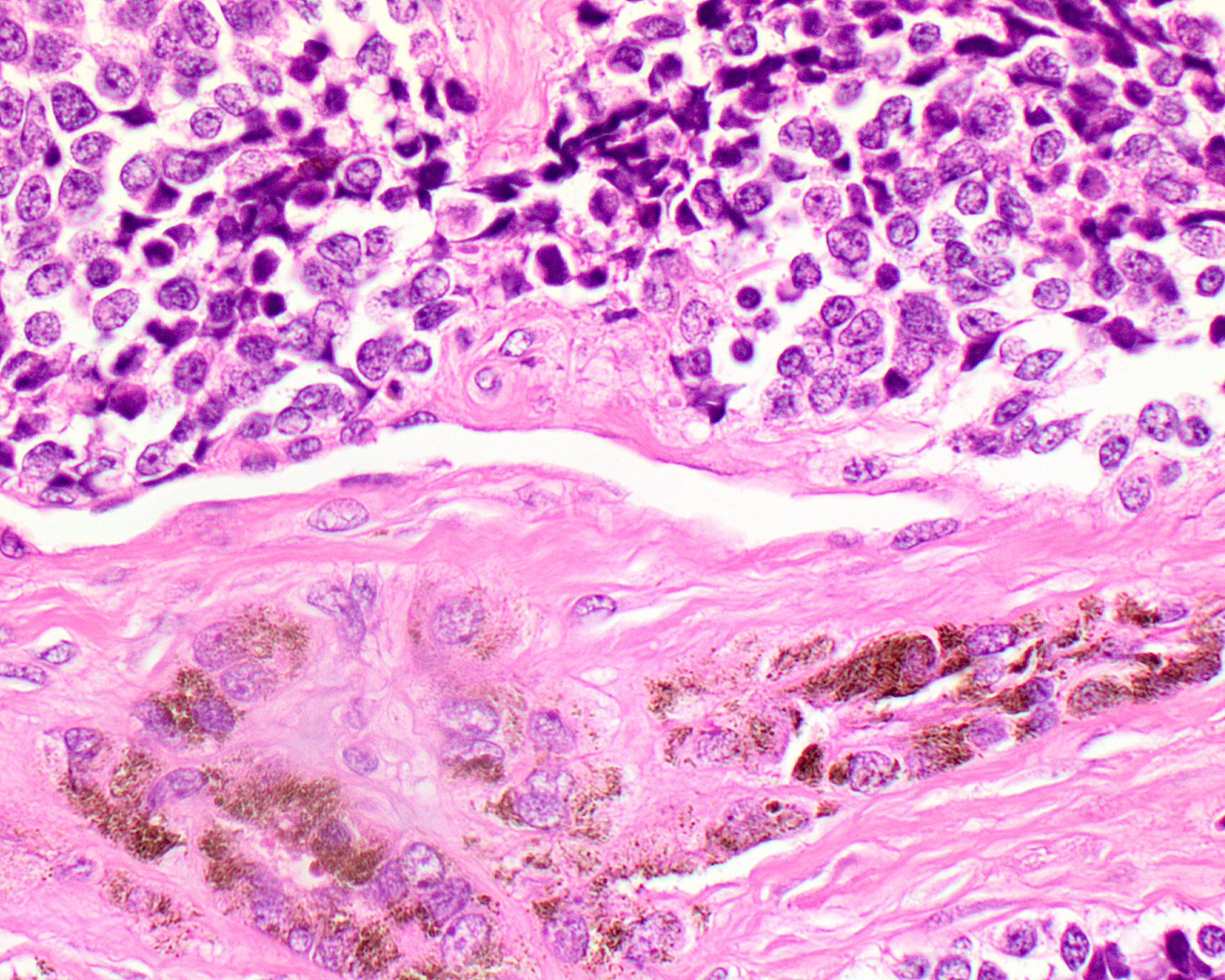
A high power of melanotic neuroectodermal tumor of infancy showing pigmented large epithelioid cells and smaller primitive cells (hematoxylin and eosin stain).

There are centrally located, small, darkly staining cells comprising the majority of cells. These cells have a fibrillary cytoplasm surrounding round nuclei with coarse and heavy nuclear chromatin. These cells are surrounded by much larger polygonal cells that have open nuclear chromatin and abundant opaque cytoplasm that has granular melanin pigment.

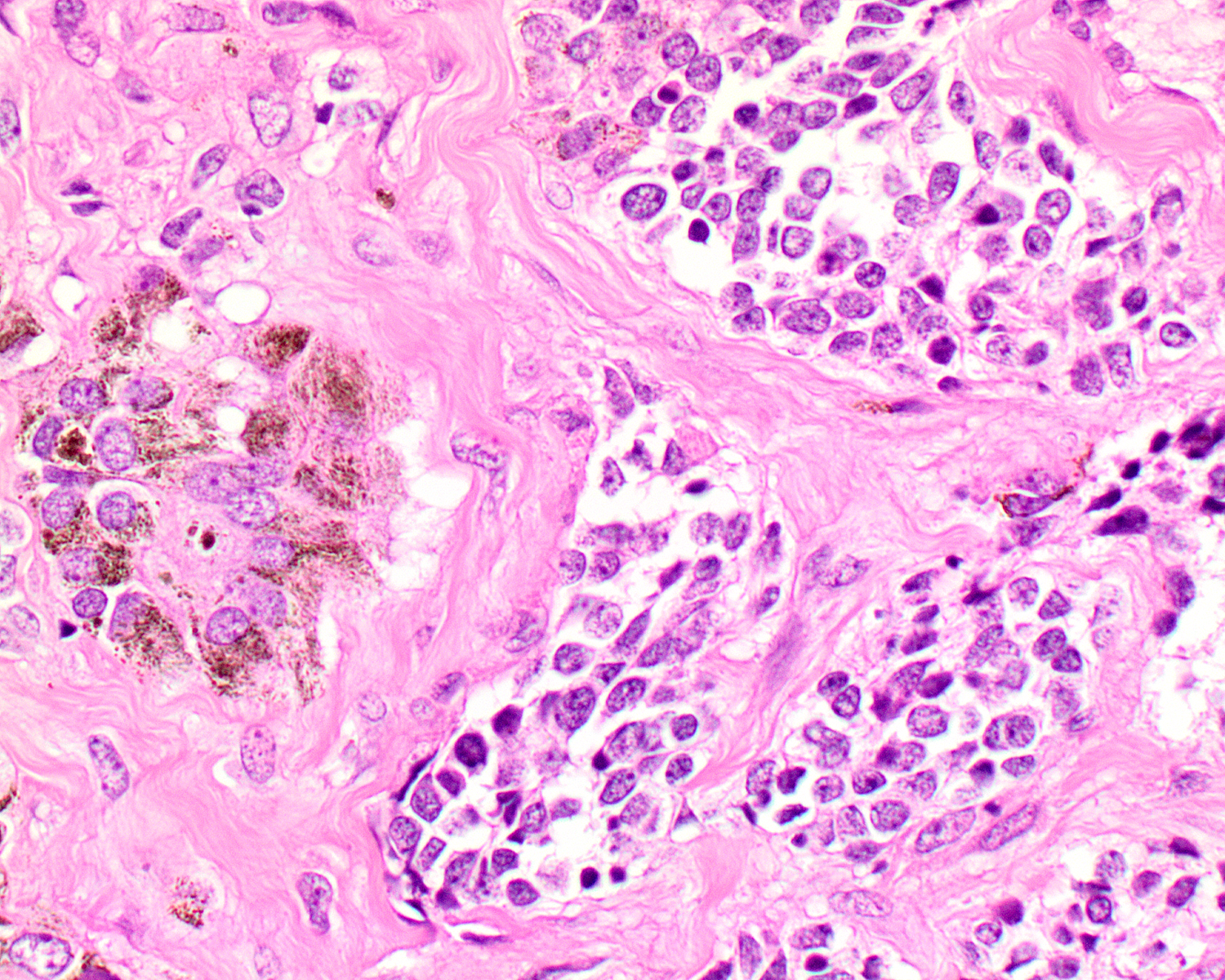
A high power of melanotic neuroectodermal tumor of infancy showing pigmented large epithelioid cells and smaller primitive cells in alveolar nests (hematoxylin and eosin stain).

There is usually no hemorrhage, necrosis or increased mitoses.

=== Immunohistochemistry ===
The lesional cells will show cross reactivity with several different families of immunohistochemistry markers (polyphenotypic), including neural, melanocytic, and epithelial.

- Large tumor cells: Keratin, vimentin, HMB-45, NSE, CD57
- Small tumor cells: Synaptophysin, GFAP, NSE, CD57
- There is usually a variable expression of EMA and S100 protein.

=== Differential diagnoses ===
It is important in this age group to exclude other tumors that can have a similar appearance, such as rhabdomyosarcoma, lymphoma, Ewing sarcoma (primitive neuroectodermal tumor), or even a melanoma (although they are very very rare in infants).

== Management ==
Even though there is often a very dramatic and rapidly enlarging, destructive tumor, there is usually a benign clinical course after complete local excision (usually by partial maxillectomy) with clear or free surgical margins. In rare cases, chemotherapy may be used for recurrent or residual tumors. Overall, the outcome is good, although it is quite unpredictable, with about 30% of patients have a recurrence. In about 10% of cases, metastasis may be seen (lymph nodes, liver, bone and soft tissue).

== Epidemiology ==
This tumor is extremely rare, with fewer than 500 cases reported worldwide. More than 95% of patients are less than 1 year of age at presentation, with about 80% less than 6 months. Females are affected more often than males (2:1).
