= Melanotransferrin =

Protein-coding gene in the species Homo sapiens

MELTF

Identifiers
- Aliases: MELTF, CD228, MAP97, MTF1, MTf, MFI2, melanotransferrin
- External IDs: OMIM: 155750; MGI: 1353421; GeneCards: MELTF

Gene location (Human)
Chr.	Chromosome 3 (human)
Band	3q29	Start	196,980,590 bp
Band	3q29	End	197,029,835 bp

Gene location (Mouse)
Chr.	Chromosome 16 (mouse)
Band	16|16 B2	Start	31,697,628 bp
Band	16|16 B2	End	31,717,838 bp
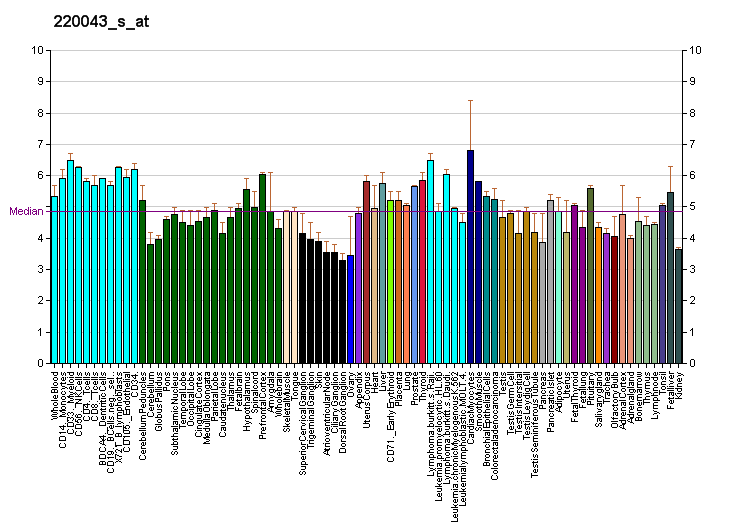
RNA expression pattern
Bgee	Human / Mouse (ortholog); Top expressed in: tibia; parotid gland; decidua; tendon of biceps brachii; renal medulla; parietal pleura; cartilage tissue; endothelial cell; amniotic fluid; germinal epithelium / Top expressed in: vestibular sensory epithelium; stria vascularis; epithelium of small intestine; trachea; migratory enteric neural crest cell; utricle; vestibular membrane of cochlear duct; intercostal muscle; ankle joint; condyle; More reference expression data
BioGPS	More reference expression data
Gene ontology
Molecular function	iron ion binding; protein binding; metal ion binding
Cellular component	cell surface; anchored component of plasma membrane; anchored component of membrane; integral component of plasma membrane; extracellular exosome; membrane; extracellular region; extracellular space; plasma membrane; endoplasmic reticulum lumen
Biological process	positive regulation of extracellular matrix disassembly; iron ion homeostasis; negative regulation of substrate adhesion-dependent cell spreading; regulation of cell population proliferation; positive regulation of plasminogen activation; ion transport; regulation of cell growth; C-terminal protein lipidation; post-translational protein modification; transport; iron ion transport
Sources:Amigo / QuickGO
Orthologs
Databases	NCBI: entry; OMA: entry
Species	Human	Mouse
Entrez	4241	30060
Ensembl	ENSG00000163975	ENSMUSG00000022780
UniProt	P08582	Q9R0R1
RefSeq (mRNA)	NM_005929; NM_033316	NM_013900
RefSeq (protein)	NP_005920; NP_201573	NP_038928
Location (UCSC)	Chr 3: 196.98 – 197.03 Mb	Chr 16: 31.7 – 31.72 Mb
PubMed search
- Wikidata
View/Edit Human	View/Edit Mouse

Melanotransferrin is a protein that in humans is encoded by the MFI2 gene. MFI2 has also recently been designated CD228 (cluster of differentiation 228).

The protein encoded by this gene is a cell-surface glycoprotein found on melanoma cells. The protein shares sequence similarity and iron-binding properties with members of the transferrin superfamily. The importance of the iron binding function has not yet been identified. This gene resides in the same region of chromosome 3 as members of the transferrin superfamily. Alternative splicing results in two transcript variants. It is part of neural crest tissue, often present in melanotic neuroectodermal tumor of infancy.
