= Josef Victor Rohon =

Austrian paleontologist and neuroanatomist

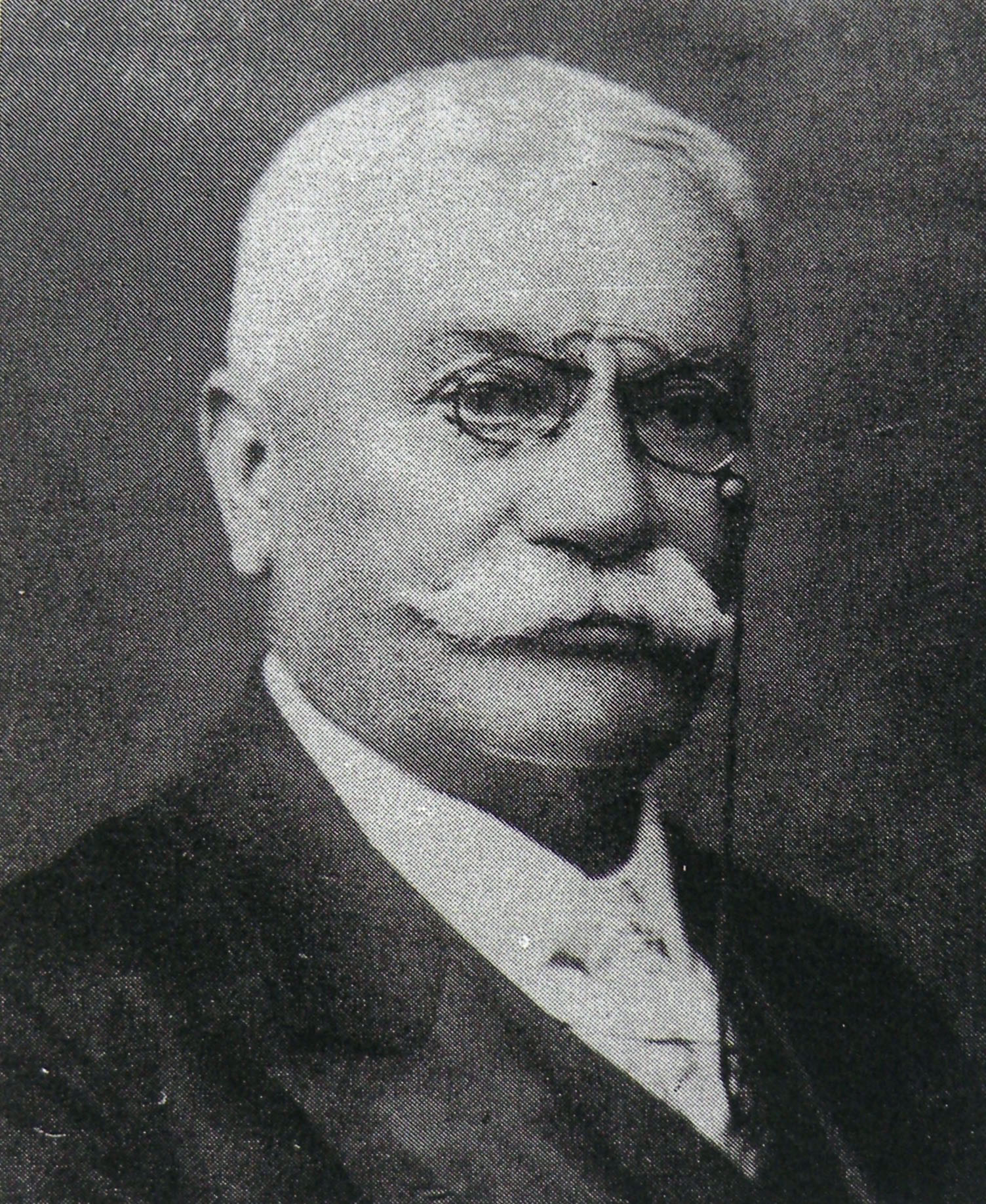
Josef Victor Rohon (1845–1923)

Josef Victor Rohon (7 May 1845, in Temes-Buttyin – 15 March 1923) was an Austrian paleontologist and neuroanatomist.

He studied medicine, zoology, and neuroanatomy at the University of Vienna, where he was influenced by Theodor Meynert (1833–1892), Carl Claus (1835–1899), Hans Kundrat (1845–1893), and Eduard Albert (1841–1900). In 1884 he graduated magna cum laude at Munich, where he spent the ensuing years conducting paleontological research. At Munich, he worked closely with Karl Alfred von Zittel (1839–1904), performing research that included anatomical studies of conodonts.

In the spring of 1888, he relocated to St. Petersburg, where he served as a private tutor until 1895. Afterwards, he was an associate professor of histology (later for embryology) at the Karl-Ferdinands-Universität in Prague. In February 1903, he attained a full professorship of histology and embryology.

His name is associated with "Rohon-Beard cells", defined as large mechanosensory neurons found in the dorsal spinal cord of fishes and amphibians. Rohon-Beard cells are present only in the embryonic and young larval (tadpole) stages.

== Selected writings ==
- Das Centralorgan des Nervensystems der Selachier, 1877 - The central organ of the nervous system of Selachians.
- Über den Ursprung des Nervus vagus bei Selachiern mit Berücksichtigung der Lobi electrici von Torpedo, 1878 - On the origin of the vagus nerve in Selachians with consideration of the Lobi Electrici of torpedo fish.
- Untersuchungen über Amphioxus lanceolatus, 1882 - Studies of amphioxus.
- Über den Ursprung des Nervus acusticus bei Petromyzonten, 1882 - On the origin of the acoustic nerve of Petromyzontiformes
- Zur Anatomie der Hirnwindungen bei den Primaten, 1884 - Anatomy involving the gyri of primates.
- Über unter-Silurische Fische 1889 - On Lower Silurian fish.
- Über fossile Fische vom Oberen Jenissei 1889 - On fossil fish of the Upper Yenisei.
- Die Dendrodonten des Devonischen Systems in Russland 1889 - Dendrodonten from the Devonian in Russia.
