= European Society of Human Genetics =

Non-profit organization

- Formation: 1967
- Type: Non-profit professional association
- Purpose: Promote genetic research and practice
- Location: Vienna, Austria
- Region served: Europe
- President: Professor Stanislas Lyonnet
- Website: www.eshg.org/home

The European Society of Human Genetics (ESHG) is a non-profit organization that promotes research, facilitates communication and encourages best practice in applications of human and medical genetics, particularly in Europe. The society organizes the annual European Human Genetics Conference and publishes the European Journal of Human Genetics.

== Sources ==
- "ABOUT THE SOCIETY". Nature Publishing Group.
- "The European Society of Human Genetics". The European Society of Human Genetics.
