= Rohon–Beard cell =

Specialized neurons with mechanoreceptive properties

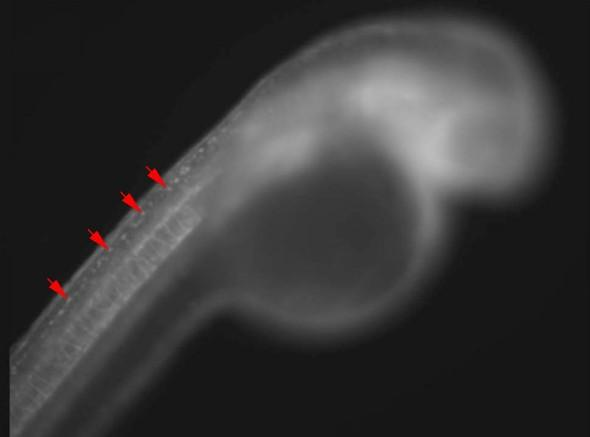
Zebrafish embryo 48 hours after fertilization. The arrows indicate four Rohon–Beard neurons.

Rohon–Beard cells are specialized primary neurons with mechanoreceptive properties. They occur during the embryonic stage of development and are found in the dorsal part of the spinal cord in fishes and amphibians. John Beard and Joseph Victor Rohon first described these cells, independently of each other. Sigmund Freud also described them as part of his Medical studies on Lampreys (Petromyzon planeri)

Rohon–Beard neurons develop on the border between the ectoderm epidermal (surface) and neuroectoderm, first in the order of receptor neurons.

The old paradigm described Rohon–Beard cells as transient during the course of ontogenetic development (e.g. in zebrafish during the first two to four weeks of development, at the late larval, early juvenile stage to be, replaced by a dorsal root ganglion of spinal nerves) and being eliminated by apoptosis. However, recent work re-examined the question and determined that the entire complement of Rohon-Beard neurons does not disappear in zebrafish, and persist until at least juvenile stages. Furthermore, Rohon-Beard neurons did not show any signs of canonical programmed cell death.

== See also ==
- Neural crest
