= Neurocristopathy =

Neural crest disease

Neurocristopathy is a diverse class of pathologies that may arise from defects in the development of tissues containing cells commonly derived from the embryonic neural crest cell lineage. The term was coined by Robert P. Bolande in 1974.

After the induction of the neural crest, the newly formed neural crest cells (NCC) delaminate from their tissue of origin and migrate from the entire neural axis of the vertebrate embryo to specific locations where they will give rise to different cell derivatives. The formation of this cell population therefore requires a timely and spatially controlled interplay of inter- and intra-cellular signals. An alteration in the occurrence and timing of these signals leads to a set of syndromes called Neurocristopathies (NCP), which comprises a broad spectrum of congenital malformations affecting an appreciable percentage of newborns. Moreover, since NCC migrate along the embryo, they are susceptible to subtle changes in the environment both during their migration and upon arrival at their destination. This means that even little modifications, either genetically or environmentally caused, in the external cues that modulate NCC migration have a deep effect on the normal migration and differentiation of these cells, thus becoming a causative factor for the development of NCP.

Recently, a new classification for this group of diseases has been proposed. This new criteria takes into account the axial origin of the NC population that contributes to the derived tissue affected in a particular NCP. According to this, some diseases have a single axial origin, i.e., they arise from an alteration in the development of only one NC population (e.g. cranial NCP, such as Auriculo Condylar Syndrome). However, other NCP arise from a defect in two or more NC populations (such as the CHARGE syndrome).

Accepted examples of NCP are piebaldism, Waardenburg syndrome, Hirschsprung disease, Ondine's curse (congenital central hypoventilation syndrome), pheochromocytoma, paraganglioma, Merkel cell carcinoma, multiple endocrine neoplasia, neurofibromatosis type I, CHARGE syndrome, familial dysautonomia, DiGeorge syndrome, Axenfeld-Rieger syndrome, Goldenhar syndrome (a.k.a. hemifacial microsomia), craniofrontonasal syndrome, congenital melanocytic nevus, melanoma, and certain congenital heart defects of the outflow tract. Recently, many diseases have been incorporated as NCP, mainly based on the finding of new NC derivatives. In particular, Multiple sclerosis has been suggested as being neurocristopathic in origin.

The usefulness of the definition resides in its ability to refer to a potentially common etiological factor for certain neoplasms and/or congenital malformation associations that are otherwise difficult to group with other means of nosology. Moreover, the classification of NCP is intended to help physicians understand the causal mechanism that drives the formation of a certain NCP, and therefore the selection of the correct diagnostic test and therapies.
