= European Journal of Human Genetics =

- Discipline: Human genetics
- Language: English
- Edited by: Alisdair McNeill

Publication details
- History: 1993-present
- Publisher: Nature Publishing Group on behalf of the European Society of Human Genetics
- Frequency: Monthly
- Impact factor: 5.1 (2024)

Standard abbreviations
- ISO 4: Eur. J. Hum. Genet.

Indexing
- CODEN: EJHGEU
- ISSN: 1018-4813 (print); 1476-5438 (web)
- LCCN: sn93038105
- OCLC no.: 730022557

Links
- Journal homepage; Online access; Online archive

The European Journal of Human Genetics is a monthly peer-reviewed scientific journal published by the Nature Publishing Group on behalf of the European Society of Human Genetics. It covers all aspects of human genetics.

== Abstracting and indexing ==
The journal is abstracted and indexed in:

- BIOSIS Previews
- Biotechnology Citation Index
- Current Contents/Life Sciences
- EMBASE/Excerpta Medica
- MEDLINE/Index Medicus
- Science Citation Index
- Scopus

According to the Journal Citation Reports, the journal had a 2024 impact factor of 4.1.
