= Rovigo =

- Comune
- Città di Rovigo
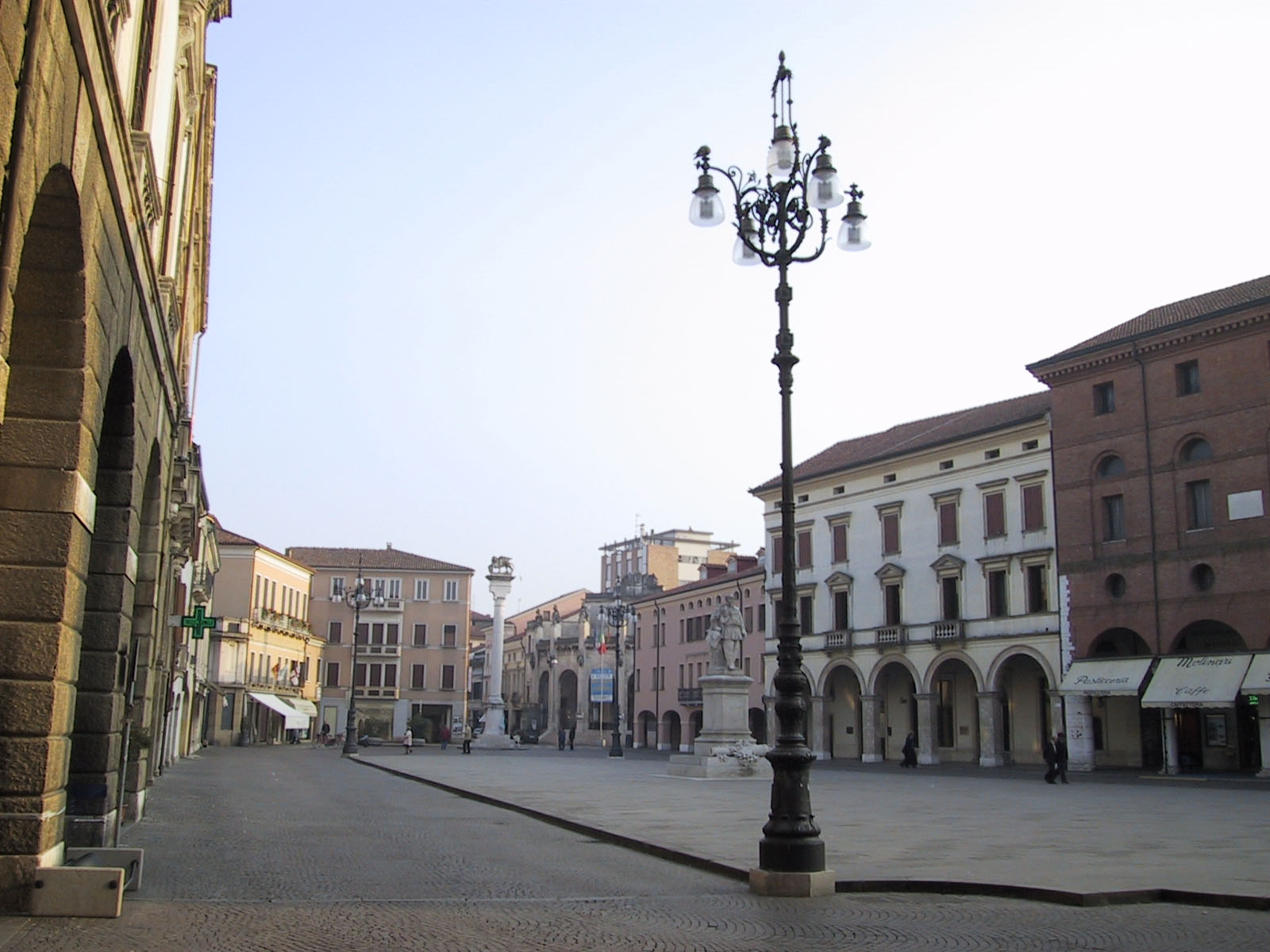
- Piazza Vittorio Emanuele II.

- Flag Coat of arms

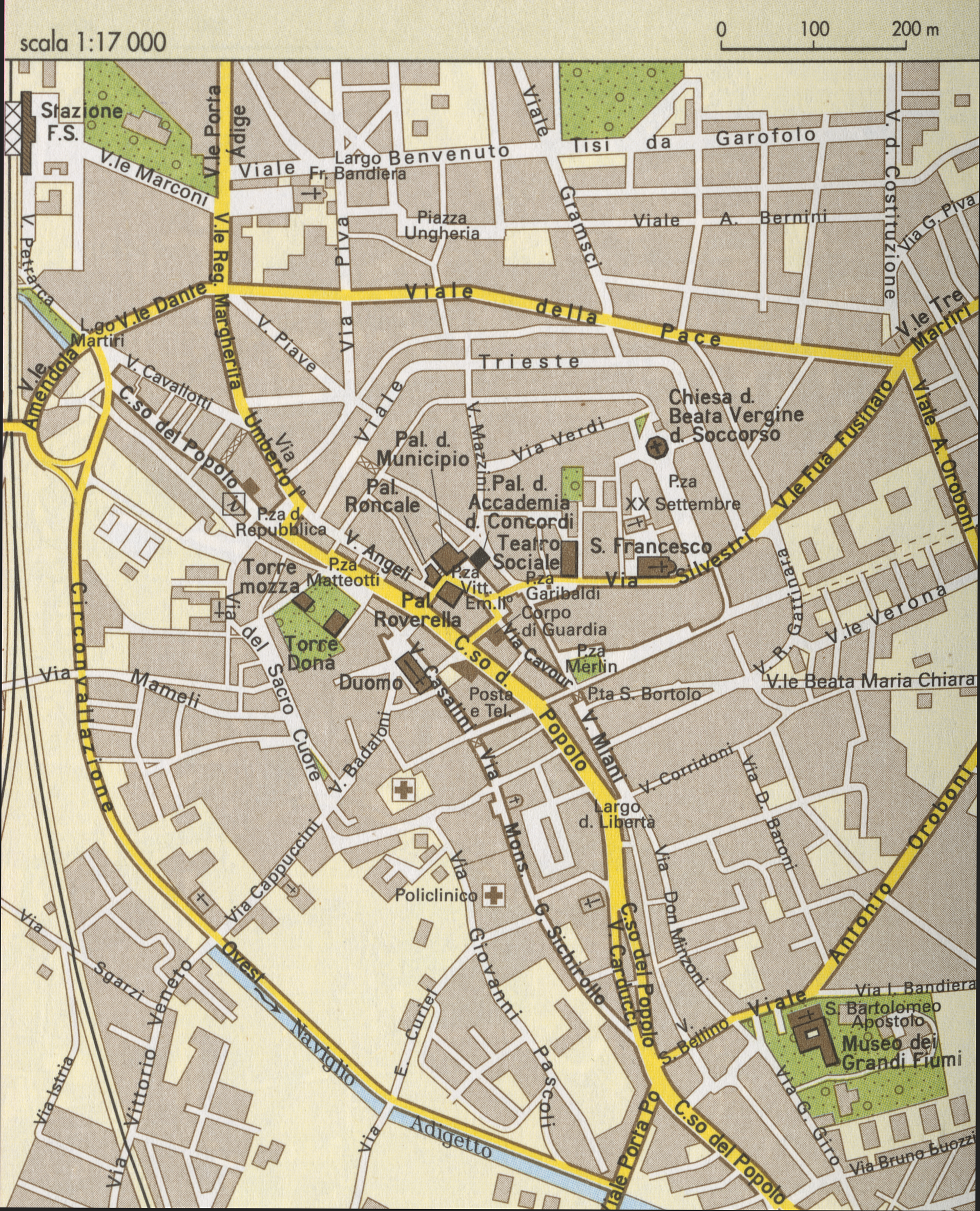
- Map of city centre

- Location within Italy Location within Veneto
- Coordinates: 45°4′13″N 11°47′26″E
- Country: Italy
- Region: Veneto
- Province: Rovigo (RO)
- Frazioni: see list

Government
  - Mayor: Valeria Cittadin (centre-left independent)

Area
  - Total: 108.81 km^{2} (42.01 sq mi)
- Elevation: 7 m (23 ft)

Population (31 May 2022)
  - Total: 50,279
  - Density: 462.08/km^{2} (1,196.8/sq mi)
- Demonym: Rodigini
- Time zone: UTC+1 (CET)
  - Summer (DST): UTC+2 (CEST)
- Postal code: 45100
- Dialing code: 0425
- Patron saint: St. Bellinus of Padua
- Saint day: November 26
- Website: Official website

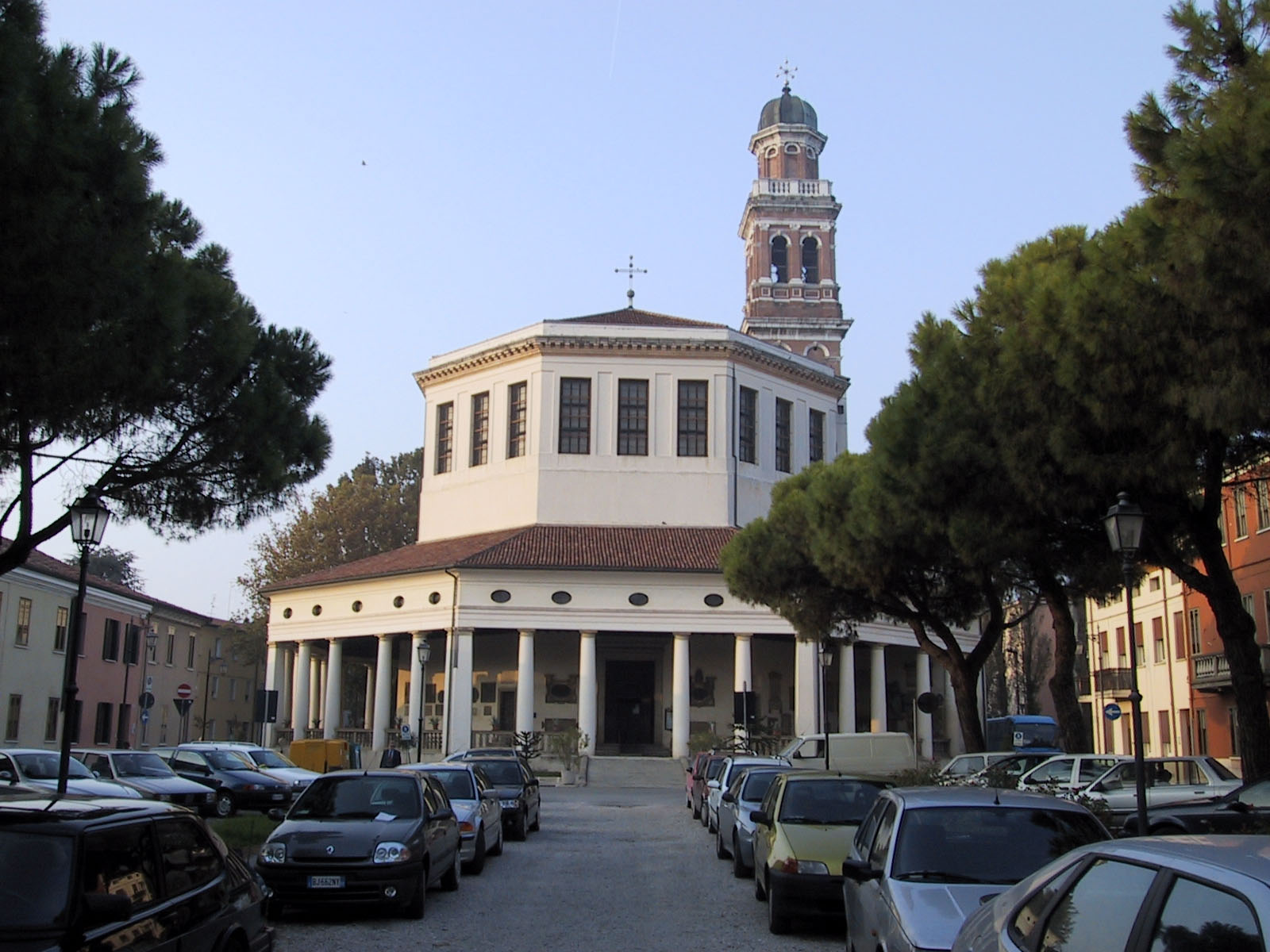
Church "La Rotonda".

Rovigo (Italian pronunciation: [roˈviːɡo], Venetian: [ɾoˈviɡo]; Emilian: Ruig) is a city and commune in the region of Veneto, Northeast Italy, the capital of the eponymous province.

== Geography ==
Rovigo stands on the low ground known as Polesine, 80 kilometres (50 mi) by rail southwest of Venice and 40 kilometres (25 mi) south-southwest of Padua, and on the Adigetto Canal. The comune of Rovigo extends between the rivers Adige and Canal Bianco, 40 kilometres (25 mi) west of the Adriatic Sea, except the frazione of Fenil del Turco that extends south of the Canal Bianco.

Polesine is the name of the low ground between the lower courses of the rivers Adige and Po and the sea; the derivation of the name is much discussed, generally applied only to the province of Rovigo, but is sometimes extended to the nearby towns of Adria and Ferrara.

== History ==
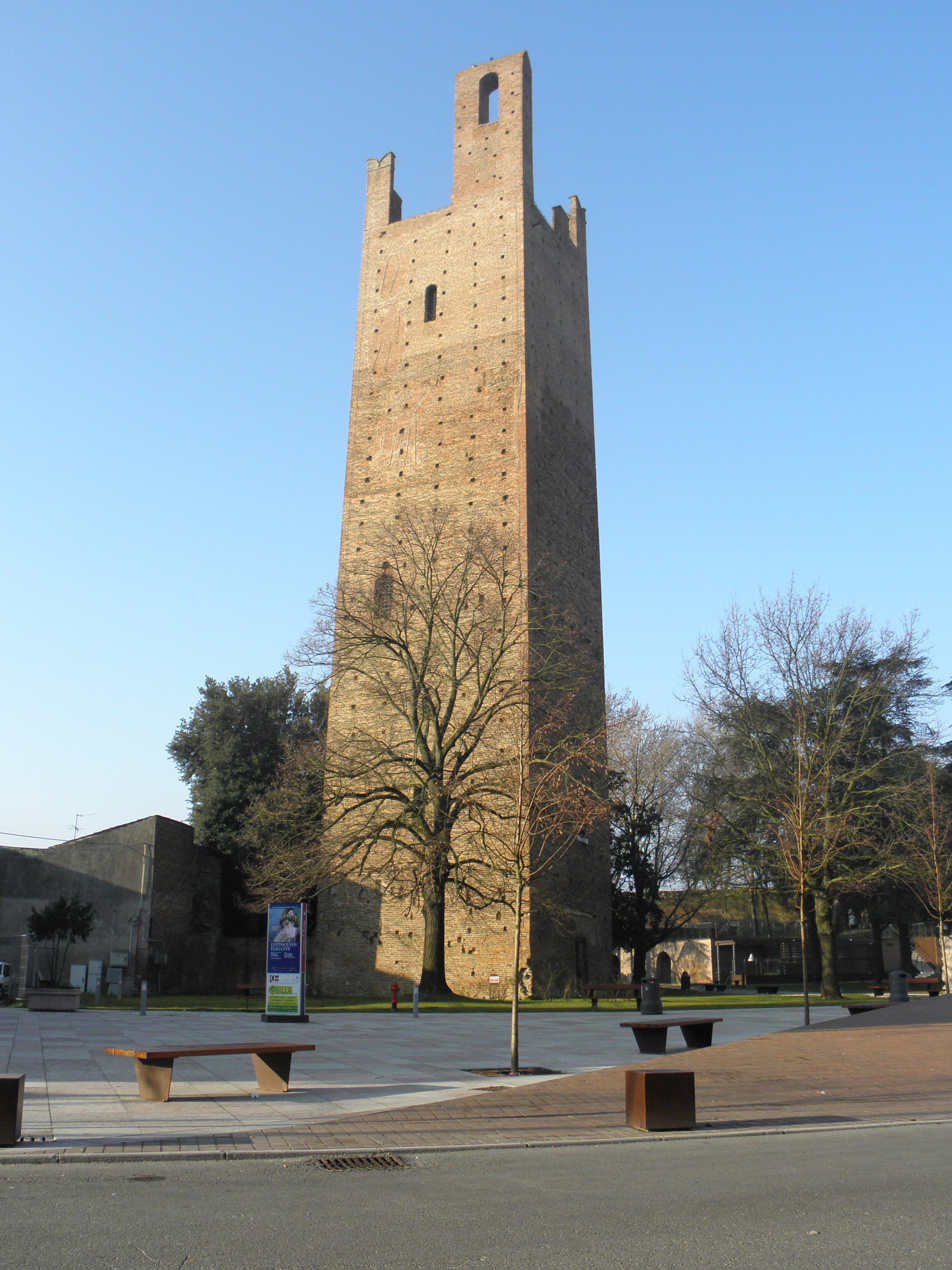
The "Donà" tower.

Rovigo (both Rodigium and Rhodigium in Latin script) appears to be first mentioned in a document from Ravenna dating April 24, 838; the origin of the name is uncertain. In 920 it was selected as his temporary residence by the bishop of Adria, Paolo Cattaneo, after the destruction of his city by Hungarian marauders; the fortifications he ordered were already finished in 945. The viscounts of Rovigo built a line of brick walls in the 1130s in the name of the House of Este. The current Torre Donà is a remnant of the castle built some time in between; it is 66 m high and it may have been the highest brick tower at that time if the date of construction is correct.

In 1194 Rovigo became a formal possession of Azzo VI d'Este, duke of Ferrara, who took the title of conte (count) of Rovigo. The Este authority ended in 1482, when the Venetians took the place by siege and retained possession of it by the peace of 1484. Although the Este recovered the city during the War of the League of Cambrai, the Venetians, returning in 1514, retained possession until the French Revolution. In 1806 Napoleon I Bonaparte created it a duché grand-fief for general Anne Jean Marie René Savary. The Austrians in 1815 made it a royal city.

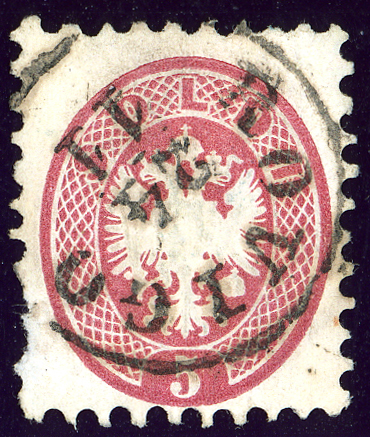
Stamp of Lombardy and Venetia, 5 soldi issue 1864, cancelled at ROVIGO

With the fall of the 1815–1866 Kingdom of Lombardy–Venetia, Rovigo was annexed to the Kingdom of Italy in 1866; in the same year it was connected by railway to Padua, Ferrara, Verona (through Legnago), and Chioggia (through Adria). In the 1900s the first modern industries were established, the most important of which was a sugar refinery. In 1927 the territory of the comune was extended including close municipalities. In 1937 the course of the Adigetto Canal was diverted to the west edge of the town and a large avenue called Corso del Popolo was built in place of the former course. In the years 1943–1945 Rovigo was part of the Italian Social Republic and it has been in Italy since 1946. In the 1950s and 1960s Rovigo had a dramatic development and it had the highest urbanization rate among the towns in the Veneto region after World War II.

== Main sights ==
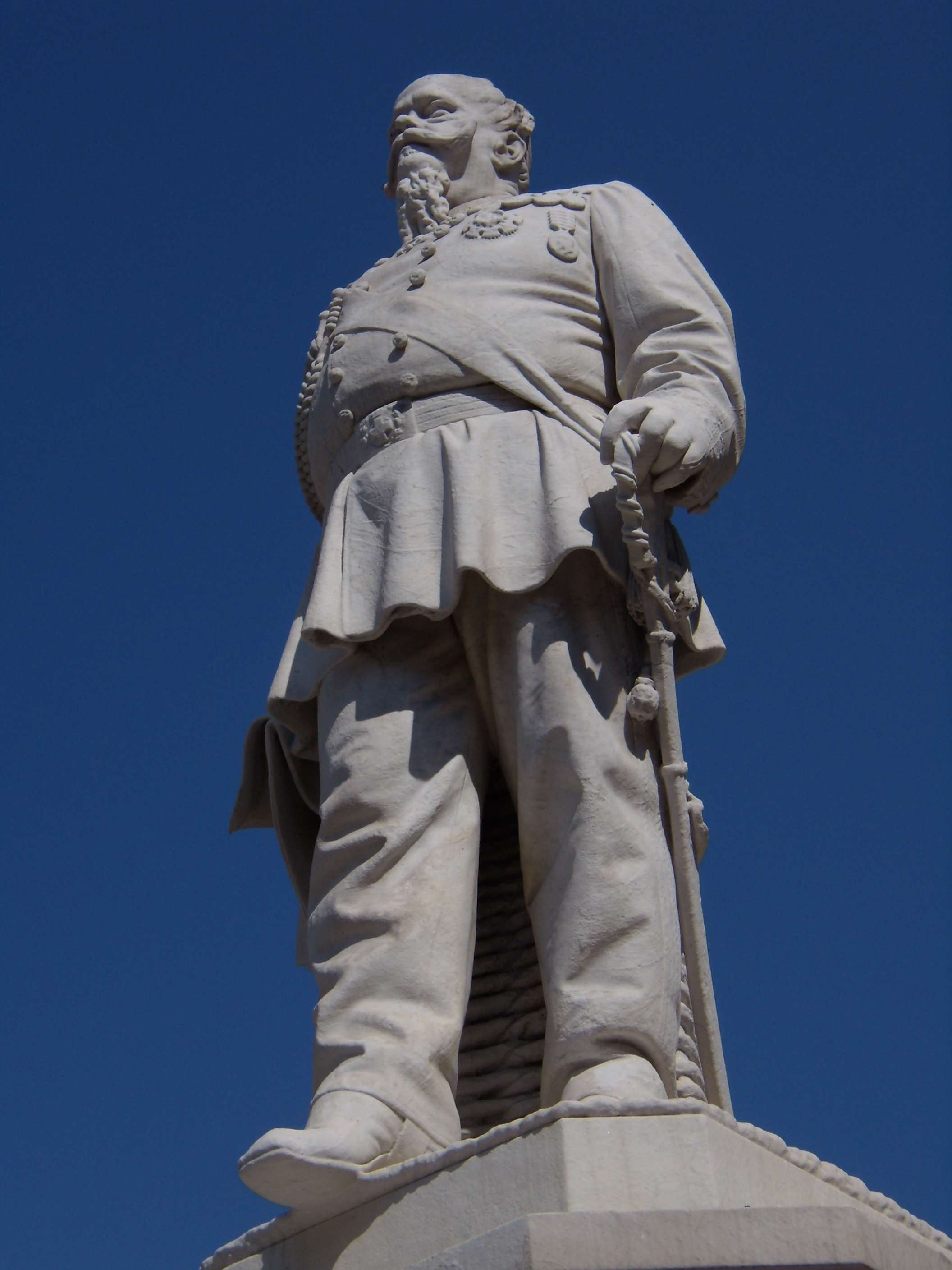
Giulio Monteverdi: Monument to Victor Emmanuel II

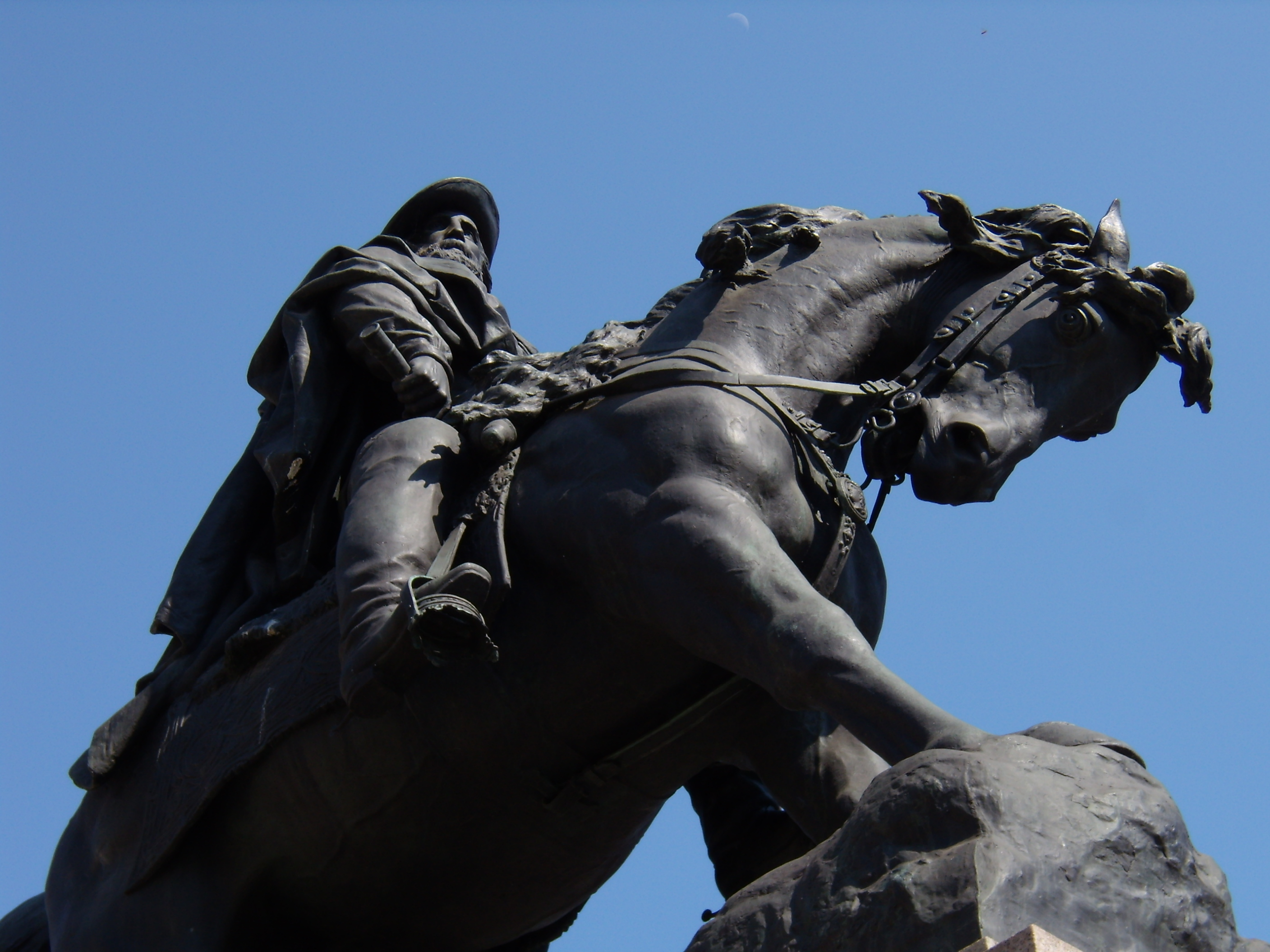
Ettore Ferrari: Monument to Giuseppe Garibaldi

The architecture of the town bears the stamp both of Venetian and of Ferrarese influence. Main sights include :

- Rovigo Cathedral (Duomo, dedicated to Martyr Pope Steven I), the co-cathedral in the bishopric of Adria–Rovigo; it was originally built before the 11th century, but rebuilt in 1461 and again in 1696. The art works of the interior includes a Resurrection of Christ by Palma the Younger.
- Ruins of the Castle (10th century), of which two towers remain
- Madonna del Soccorso: church best known as La Rotonda. If was built between 1594 and 1606 by Francesco Zamberlan of Bassano, a pupil of Palladio, to house a miraculous image of a sitting Madonna with Child carrying a rose. The edifice has octagonal plan, surrounded by a portico, begun in 1594. The original construction had a cupola, which was later substituted by a simple ceiling for static reasons. The fine campanile, standing at 57 m, was built according to plans by Baldassarre Longhena (1655–1673). The walls of the interior of the church are wholly covered by 17th centuries paintings by prominent provincial and Venetian artists, including Francesco Maffei, Domenico Stella, Giovanni Abriani, Alessandro Varotari (il Padovanino), Pietro Vecchia, Pietro Liberi, Antonio Zanchi and Andrea Celesti.
- Immacolata Concezione : Church dating to 1213.
- San Francesco: church in Gothic-Romanesque style but with extensive intervention from the 19th century. The belfry is from 1520. In the interior are several Saints sculptures by Tullio Lombardo (1526).
- The Town hall, which contains a library including some rare early editions, belonging to the Accademia de Concordi, founded in 1580, and a fair picture gallery enriched with the spoils of the monasteries.
- Palazzo Roverella, largely restored but still example of Renaissance architecture, now serves as town art gallery.
- Palazzo Roncale: Renaissance palace (1555) by Michele Sanmicheli
- Palazzo Venezze (1715)
- Pinacoteca dei Concordi ("Concordi Gallery") houses important paintings, including a Madonna with Child and Christ with the Cross by Giovanni Bellini, a Flagellation of Christ by Palma the Elder, a Venus with the Mirror by Jan Gossaert, and portraits by Tiepolo and Alessandro Longhi.

== Villages nearby ==
Barchessa Candiani, Basso Cavallo, Boara Polesine, Boaria San Marco, Borsea, Braga-Cantonazzo, Buso, Busovecchio, Ca'Bianca, Ca'Matte, Ca'Lunga, Campagna Terzi, Campagnazza, Cantonazzo, Capolavia, Ca'Rangon, Ceregnano, Concadirame, Corte Lazzarini, Fenile Morosina, Fenil del Turco, Granzette, Grignano Polesine, Grompo, Grumolo, Le Cassette, Le Giarelle, Le Sorbolaro, L'Olmo, Lusia, Mardimago, Roverdicrè, San Sisto, Santa Libera, Santa Rita, Sant'Apollinare, Sarzano, Spianata and Villadose.

== Twin towns – sister cities ==
Rovigo is twinned with:

- Bedford, United Kingdom
- Tulcea, Romania
- Viernheim, Germany

== Schools and universities ==
Rovigo Conservatory of Music

ITS Viola Marchesini

== Sport ==
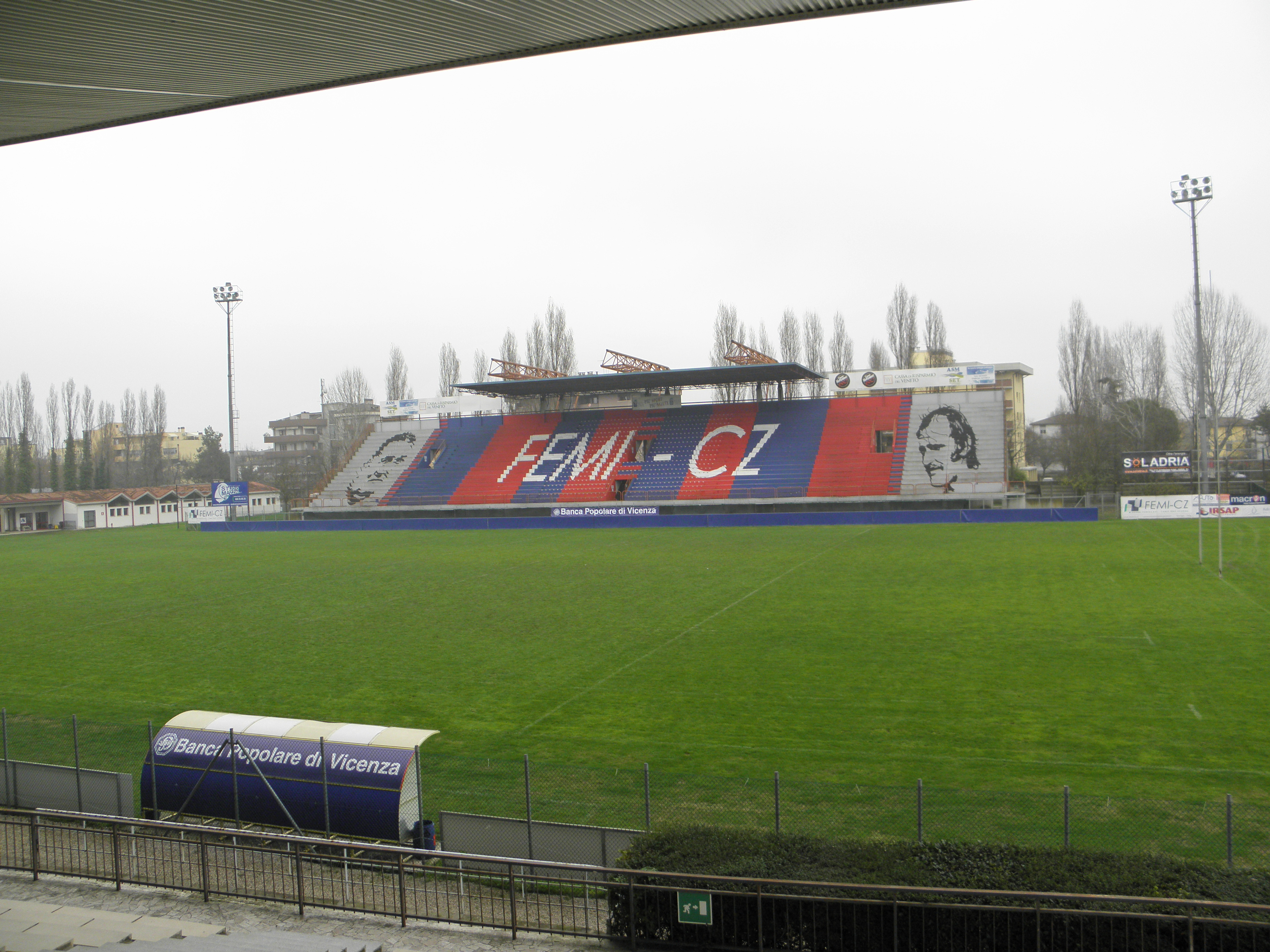
The "Isidoro Quaglio" tribune of Mario Battaglini Stadium, in Rovigo.

Rovigo is home of Rugby Rovigo, the city's rugby team has won the Top10 competition 13 times. The team has attracted many famous from around the rugby world, including Naas Botha and the coach Carwyn James.

Other practiced sports include football/soccer, swimming, handball, baseball and roller hockey. The "Rosso Blu" as the baseball team is known is at the level of Serie "A" competition. Notable American players who have played for Rovigo Baseball include: Nathan Cardella (Fresno, Ca.) and Mark Peracchi (San Francisco, Ca).

Rovigo is the first Italian city to have a Gaelic football club. Ascaro Rovigo Gaelic Football Club was founded on June 2, 2011. President and founder of Rovigo GAA Raffaello Franco went to Ireland for his honeymoon that year where he watched a football game at Croke Park – he returned home with an O'Neills ball and a dream to set up a GAA club in Italy. Within two years the resulting club's football team of about 90% Italian players are going from strength to strength as they embrace every code that the GAA has to offer. The team colours are red and blue.

== Transportation ==
Rovigo railway station, opened in 1866, forms part of the Padua–Bologna railway, and is also a junction station for two other lines. Heading eastwards, towards Adria and Chioggia, is the Rovigo–Chioggia railway, and heading west, towards Legnago and Verona, is the Verona–Legnago–Rovigo railway.

== See also ==
- Baseggio Family
- Roman Catholic Diocese of Adria-Rovigo

== Sources ==
- Various (1988). Rovigo. Ritratto di una Città. Rovigo: Minelliana.
