= Polesine =

Geographic and historic area in north-east Italy

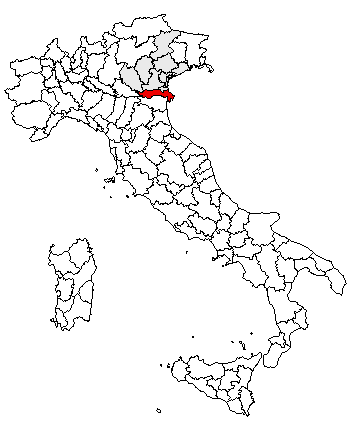
This map highlights the location of what is nowadays Polesine in Italy.

Polesine (Italian: [poˈleːzine]; unified Venetian script: Połéxine [poˈɰezine]; Ferrarese: Pulésan) is a geographic and historic area in the north-east of Italy whose limits varied through centuries; it had also been known as Polesine of Rovigo for some time.

Nowadays it corresponds with the province of Rovigo in the viewpoint of political geography. In the viewpoint of physical geography it is a strip of land about 100-km long and 18-km wide located between the lower courses of the Adige and the Po rivers, limited to the east by the Adriatic Sea and leaving the western limit undefined.

== Geography ==
The eastern portion of Polesine corresponds to the delta of the Po, and it is constantly expanding eastward because of the detritus sediment phenomenon.

The Po and the Adige are the first and the third biggest rivers of Italy as for rate of flow, yet another river flows across Polesine between these two main rivers: the Canal Bianco; this means that by far most of the fresh water of Italy flows into the sea through Polesine. Due to this large amount of water it has to deal with, it has many canals for drainage.

The biggest city is Rovigo (51,000 inhabitants), followed by Adria (20,000 people). Other important centres are Porto Viro, Lendinara, Porto Tolle, Badia Polesine, Occhiobello and Taglio di Po. Important agricultural centres are Arquà Polesine, Loreo, Polesella and Lusia.

== Etymology ==
Polesine is a Venetian term from Medieval Latin pollicĭnum or policĭnum, meaning "swamp" or "wetland"; this is because this territory was a swamp when it was given the name. This happened after the disasters in the Venetian hydrography that followed the decline of the Roman Empire.

== History ==
=== Mythological origins of Polesine ===
Polesine's origins are connected with the myth of Phaeton, the young god who drowned with the Sun chariot in the river Eridano (the former name of the river Po). In Crespino, a small village in Polesine, there is a square (the chief one of the town) dedicated to Phaeton, to commemorate the old legend and the oral tradition saying that Phaeton died in the tract of the river Po crossing Crespino.

=== Ancient times ===
The Adige river flowed more to the north than nowadays and the main course of the Po river was more to the south (more or less it was the current Po of Volano channel). This means that in ancient times the area lying between the two rivers was much larger than the current area named Polesine.

The Veneti founded a settlement at Adria in the 12th century BC on a former channel of the Po. At that time the main stream of the Po, the Adria channel, flowed into the sea in this area; nowadays it is the lower course of the Canal Bianco river. The Adria channel was then recognized to be the lower course of the Mincio river, that was flowing into the Adriatic sea in ancient times.

The Villanovan culture, named for an archaeological site at the village of Villanova, flourished in this area from the tenth until as late as the sixth century BC. The foundation of the Etruscan city of Atria (today Adria) dates from 530 to 520 BC. The sea was later given the name Adriatic after the city's name.

Etruscans and Venetians inhabited the area during the 6th and 5th centuries BC, then it was conquered by the Romans. Etruscans and Romans decontaminated the area by digging canals for drainage.

Some historians think that the battle of the Raudine Plain of 101 BC could have been fought in this area.

=== Medieval and Modern history ===
After the fall of Rome and the disasters in the hydrography of the whole Veneto, traditionally referred to as the breach at Cucca in 589, Adria and its port lost their significance. In the meantime Rovigo was founded and fortified later in the 10th century, and provided of a city wall in the 12th century; it became the new centre of the area.

In 1152, another disaster changed the hydrography of Polesine: a breach opened in the banks of the Po at Ficarolo and the new main course started flowing much closer to the Adige. The rulers of the whole area (except for the new delta of the Po) were the Este; the area was formerly named County of Gavello, but two centuries after the disaster and due to the decline of the Abbey of Gavello it started being named County of Rovigo.

Progression of Polesine since 1484. Yellow area is the Territory of Polesine established in 1484 inside the Mainland State of the Republic of Venice after the War of Ferrara; red area is part of the lands that had been detached from the Papal States and was annexed to Polesine in 1815 to establish the Provincie of Rovigo inside the Kingdom of Lombardy–Venetia; greenish area is the other part of the lands that had been detached from the Papal States in 1815 but at first was annexed to the Province of Venice inside the Kingdom of Lombardy–Venetia; green and greenish areas together were detached in 1851 from the Province of Venice and annexed to the Province of Rovigo. Lighter land has recent formation, roughly from 1604 onwards.

In 1484, after the end of the War of Ferrara, the Republic of Venice took possession of the area north of the Tartaro-Canalbianco, named "Polesine of Rovigo" by the Este because of its characteristic of being an island between rivers; other lands outside the proper named "Polesine of Rovigo" were also annexed, including the areas of Adria, Polesella and Guarda Veneta. All these areas established the Territory of Polesine inside the Domini di Terraferma (Mainland State) of the Republic of Venice.

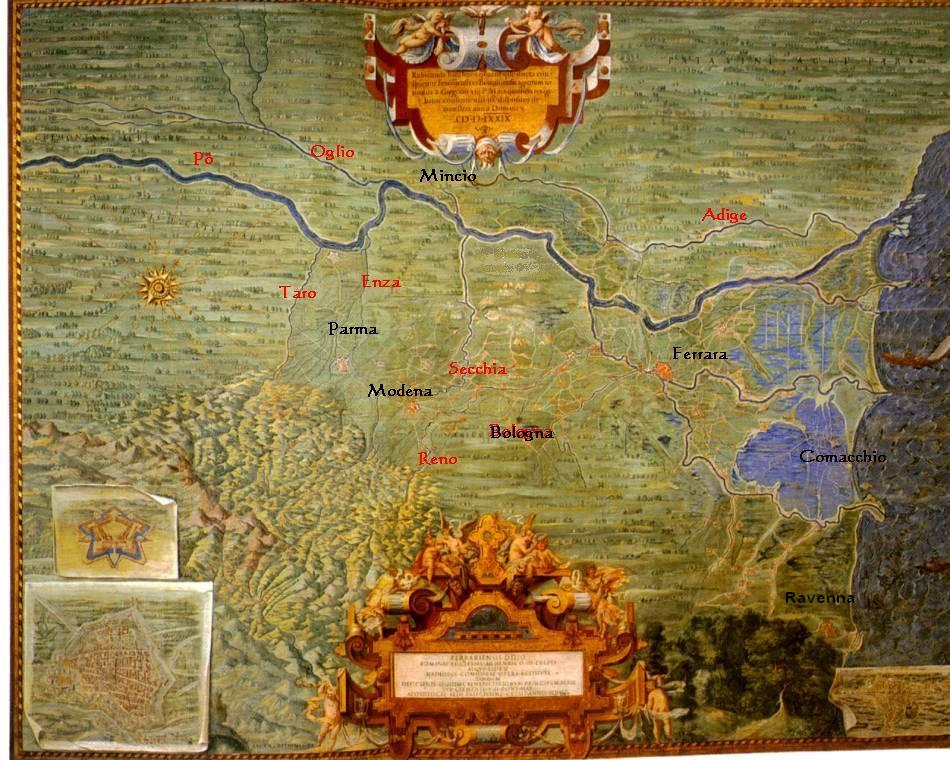
Polesine (located at the north-east in this map) and Emilia-Romagna in 1585. It can be noted that the main course of the Po was northern before the "cutting of Porto Viro" of 1604.

The Este claimed again the possession of the whole Polesine during the war of the League of Cambrai, but after a short occupation in 1508-1511 the frontiers were back to those of 1484.

Between 1602 and 1604, an agreement between the Republic of Venice and the Papal States that then ruled over the southern part of the Po delta allowed the digging of a new final course for the Po known as the "cutting of Porto Viro"; the toponym Taglio di Po means exactly "cutting of Po" and refers to this event, that has been the last change in the main course of the river until today.

=== Contemporary history ===
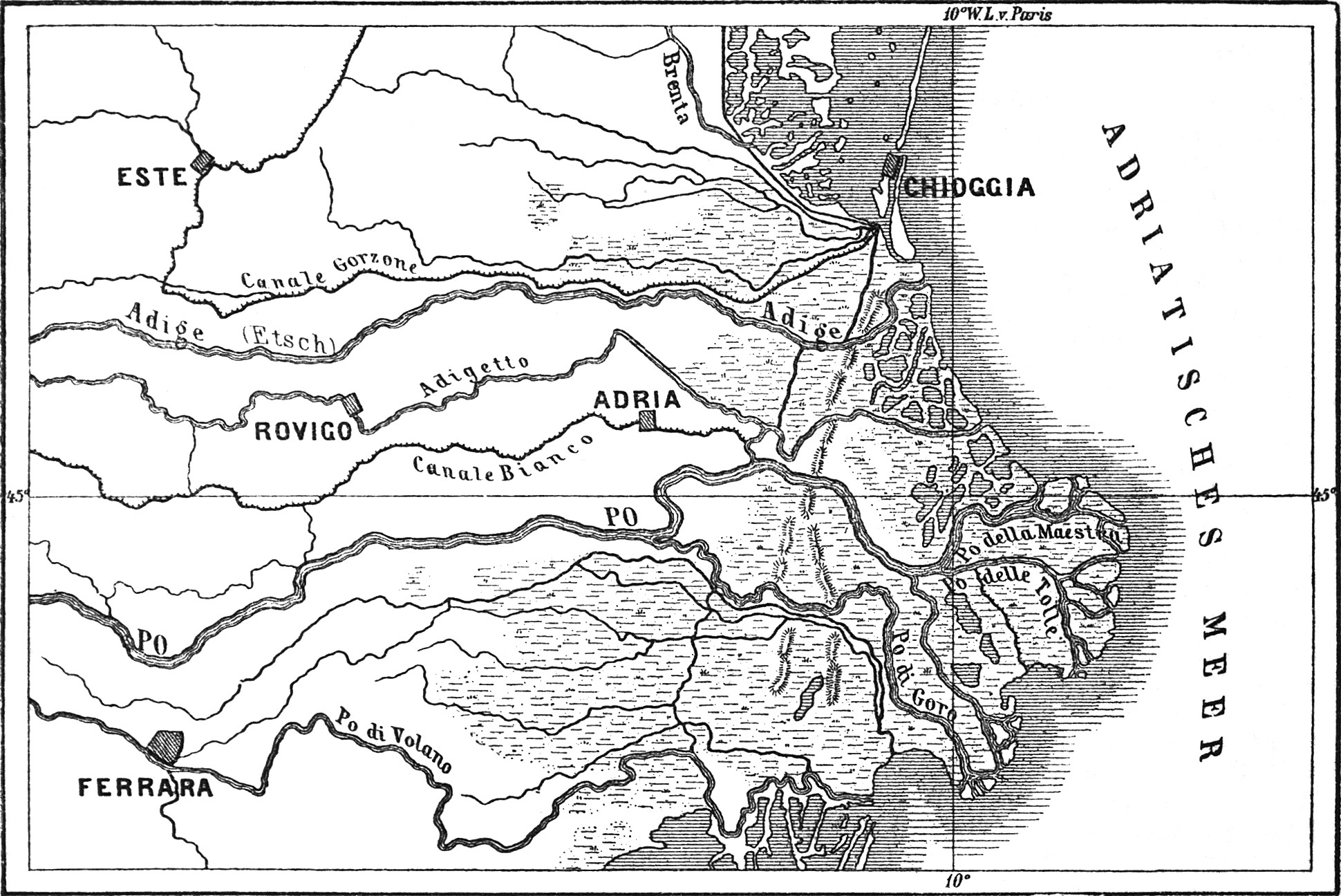
The middle and east parts of Polesine in 1885. You can note that the main courses of the Adige and the Po are those of nowadays.

After the Congress of Vienna in 1815 all the lands to the north of the Po were included into the Kingdom of Lombardy–Venetia; part of these lands, the western and central lands, were annexed to the Territory of Rovigo to establish the Province of Rovigo in the Kingdom of Lombardy–Venetia. The eastern lands were at first annexed to the Province of Venice; on 1851 the whole Po delta was detached from the Province of Venice and attached to the Province of Rovigo, thus giving the Polesine the extension it has nowadays.

== The floods ==
Due to the large amount of water passing through Polesine, many floods happened during the centuries. The main floods had been:

- 589 (Adige): the disaster mentioned above as the breach at Cucca, that changed the main course of the Adige;
- 950 (Adige): a breach opened at Pinzone, nowadays Badia Polesine, and the river diverted into the former course of the Tartaro;
- 1152 (Po): the disaster mentioned above as the breach at Ficarolo, that changed the main course of the Po;
- 1438 (Adige): again the main course of the river changed; it no more passed through Rovigo, and it has started flowing in the bed it has nowadays;
- 1882 (Adige): the territory between the Adige and the Canalbianco was flooded; 63,000 people left the country and emigrated to South America.
- 1951 (Po): two thirds of Polesine was flooded, compelling 150,000 people to evacuate the entire area.

== Geological formation of the area ==
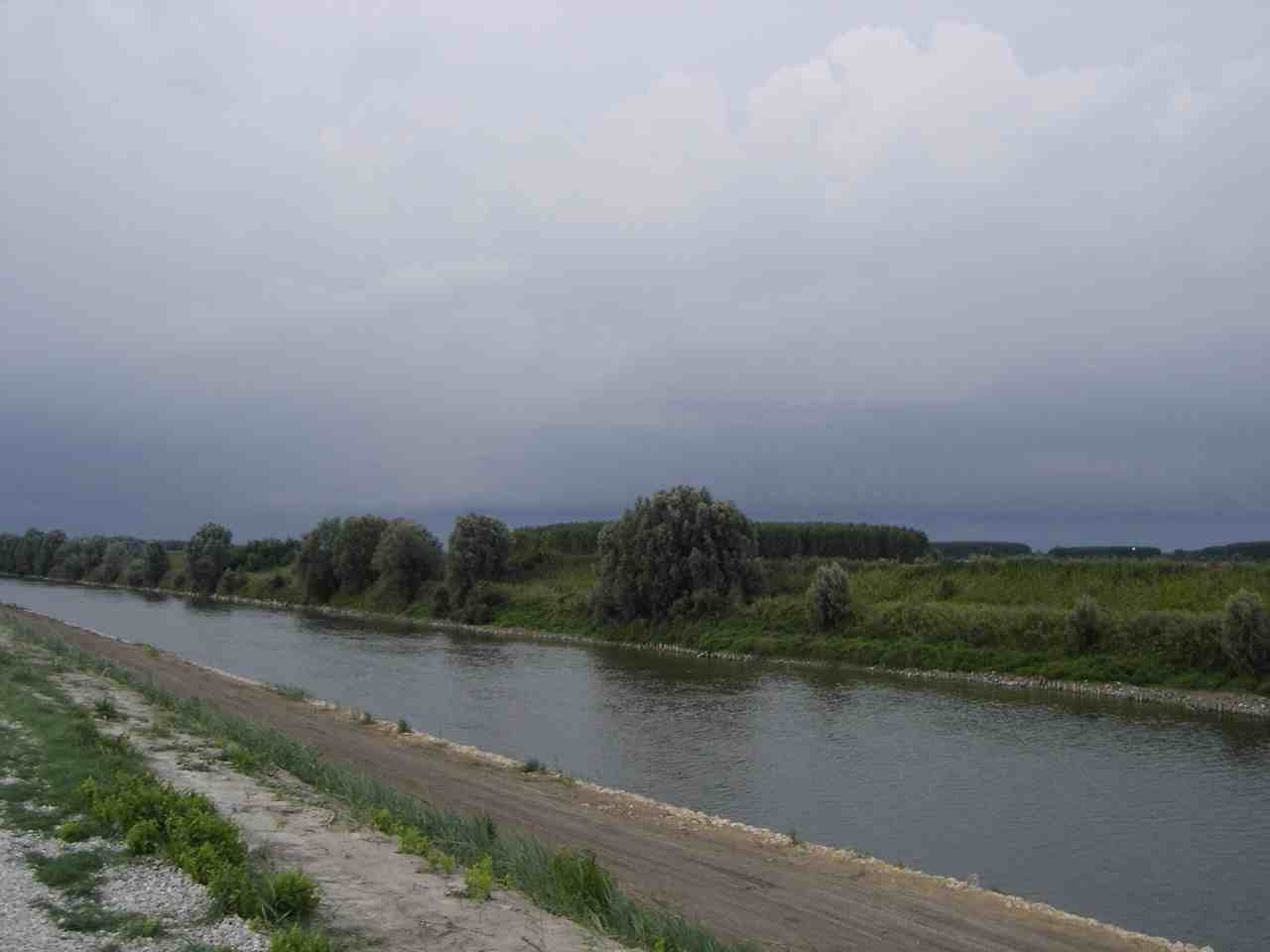
The Adige river as it enters the Polesine near Badia Polesine.

Actual Polesine territory is, geologically speaking, of recent formation, created by drifts taken by rivers Po and Adige, and subsequently from human modifications. In fact, men reclaimed and decontaminated the area before embanking the biggest waterways.

First origins goes up to the Pliocene epoch. Contemporary to the rising of Alps and Apennine Mountains, the entire Padania was filled by a long inlet (the Adriatic depression) and the seabed of this huge ditch was full of troughs and elevations.

At the end of the last glaciation (10.000 years ago), most of Padania actual territory was just formed. Landscape's last mutation was due to the raising of the sea level and the ice melting.

In 1604, river Po's natural course was artificially modified and after this work actual delta was formed. Floods frequently happened in Polesine filled the depressions of the area with several bundles of sediments consisting in sand, clay and silt.
