= Atrian =

Atrian may refer to

- Atrian, a member of the extraterrestrial species on the U.S. TV series Star-Crossed
- Atrian, someone from the planet Atrios in the fourth Doctor Who story The Armageddon Factor
- Adrian or Atrian, relating to Adria, a town in Italy
- Atrian, relating to Atri, Abruzzo or the ancient Adria in Italy
- Adria (river), a river in Italy
- Atrian Ladore, a participant in Athletics at the 2002 Micronesian Games
