= Sant'Apollinare, Rovigo =

Sant'Apollinare
- Frazione
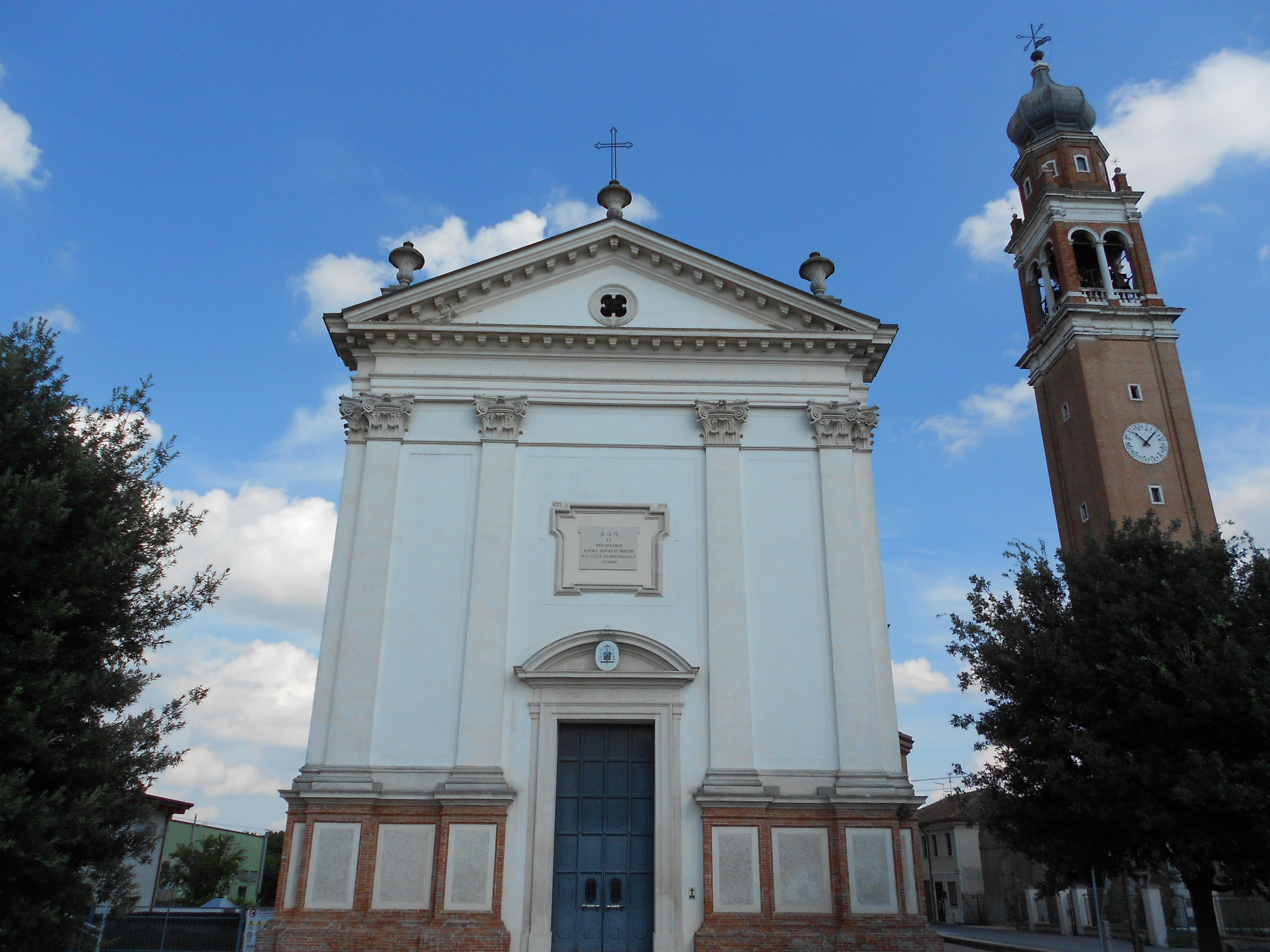
- Chiesa Arcipetrale di Sant'Apollinare, Rovigo
- Interactive map of Sant'Apollinare
- Country: Italy
- Region: Veneto
- Province: Rovigo
- Comune: Rovigo

Area
  - Total: 17,968 km^{2} (6,937 sq mi)

Sant'Apollinare is a frazione of the city Rovigo, located in the region Veneto, Italy.

== History ==
Together with the frazione Fenil del Turco it once was an autonomous comune called "Sant'Apollinare con Selva" after a deliberation on 18 March 1867. In 1927 the municipality was suppressed and included in the municipality of Rovigo together with other districts, such as: Boara Polesine, Borsea, Buso Sarzano, Concadirame and Grignano di Polesine.

== Landmarks ==
=== Religious architecture ===
- Chiesa arcipretale di Sant'Apollinare. It has the dignity of being a minor cathedral.
- Oratorio di San Pietro

=== Civilian architecture ===
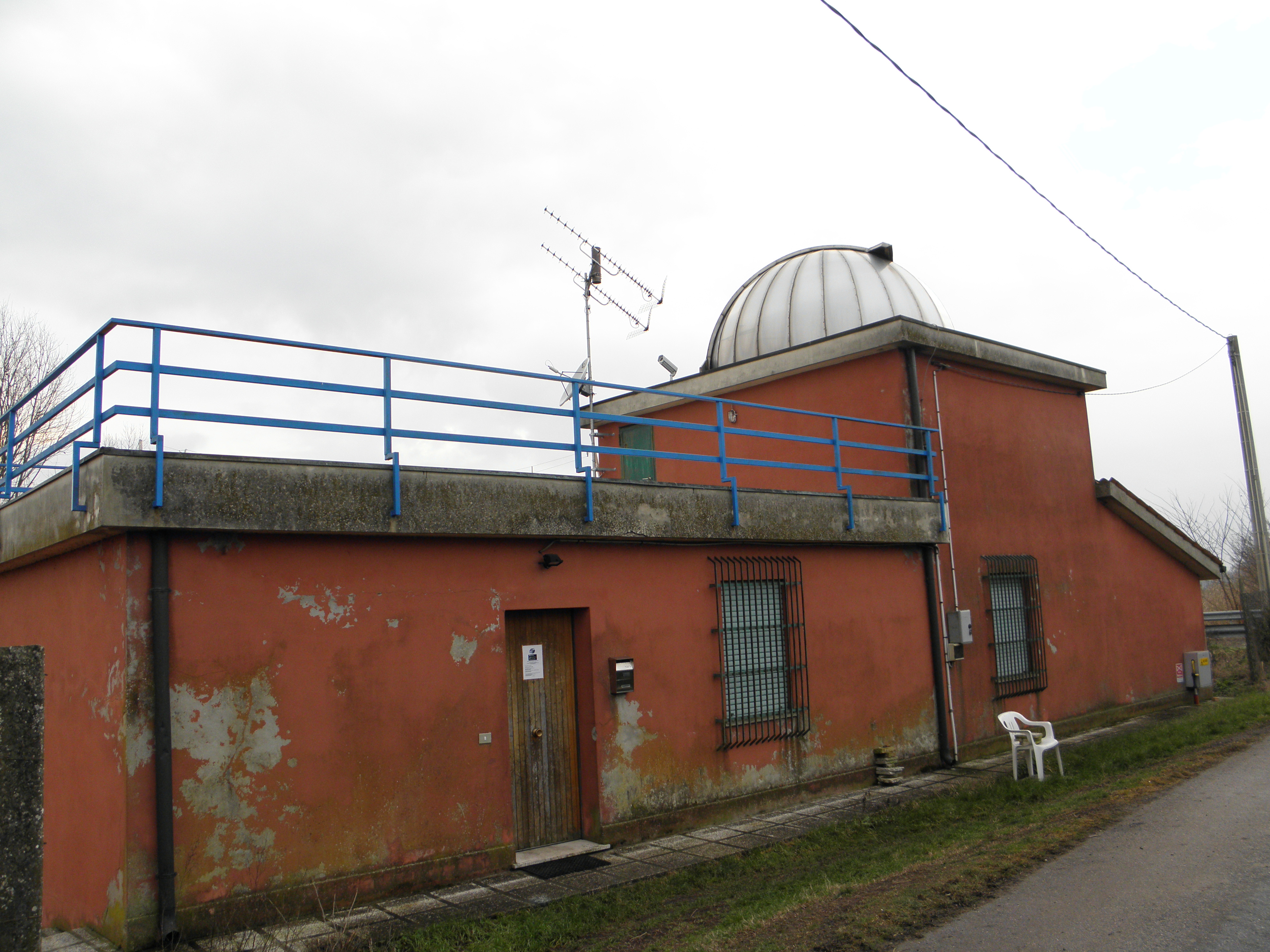
Observatory "Vanni Bazzan".

The astronomical observatory "Vanni Bazzan", managed by Gruppo Astrofili Polesani (G.A.P.), is located not far from the center of the district and offers shows of various kinds and night sky viewing. The observatory is equipped with a reflecting telescope with Newton configuration of 410mm diameter and focal length of 1900mm (f≈1:5). The observatory also has a reflecting telescope with 250mm lens and focal length of 2050mm (f=1:10).

A Radio telescope "Spyder 230" of 2300mm diameter was implemented in November 2016 to study radio sources.

On the terrace of the observatory there are other available portable telescopes both of the reflecting and refracting type, to observe constellations or to help observers understand the night sky better.

== Infrastructures and transportation ==
Close to the center of Sant'Apollinare there is an aerodrome called "Aviosuperficie Sant'Apollinare" used for touristic traffic and headquarters of aeronautic festivals.

== Bibliography ==
- Gabrielli, Alberino (1993). Comunità e chiese nella diocesi di Adria-Rovigo (in Italian). Roma: Ciscra.
- Raccolta ufficiale delle leggi e dei decreti del Regno d'Italia, v.19 (in Italian). Stamperia reale. 1867.
