= Grignano =

Grignano can refer to the following places in Italy:

- Grignano (Brembate), the only frazione of Brembate
- Grignano (Castellina in Chianti), frazione of Castellina in Chianti
- Grignano (Prato), frazione of Prato
- Grignano (Trieste), frazione of Trieste
- Grignano Polesine, frazione of Rovigo
