= Reitia =

Ancient goddess of the Veneti of northeast Italy

Reitia (Venetic: 𐌓𐌄:𐌉:𐌕𐌉:𐌀) was a goddess, one of the best known deities of the Adriatic Veneti of northeastern Italy.

While her place in the Venetic pantheon cannot be known for certain, the importance of her cult to Venetic society is well attested in archaeological finds. A large body of votive offerings on pottery and metal objects has been found at a Venetic shrine in Baratella, near Este. In Venetic, she is given the epithets Śahnate "the Healer" and Pora "the good and kind."

She was a deity of writing; Marcel Detienne interprets the name Reitia as "the one who writes" (compare Proto-Germanic *wreitan- 'to write'). Inscriptions dedicating offerings to Reitia are one of our chief sources of knowledge of the Venetic language. The Romans identified her with Diana and under her Greek name Artemis. Roman-era inscriptions from Northern Italy and the Alpine region show Diana and the Greek Artemis taking Reitia's place as healer, a function only observed in that area, as in an incomplete inscription on a roll-up silver sheet found in Austria, dated to the 2nd century A.D., which reads:

For migraines. Antaura came out of the ocean; she cried like a deer; she moaned like a cow. Artemis Ephesia met her: "Antaura, where are you bringing the headache? Not to the . . ."

On the other hand, Strabo tells how the people of Northern Italy worshipped Artemis above all other gods, hinting at her syncretism to the local Raetia.

== Other instances of the name ==
Reitia Chasma, a geological feature on the planet Venus, is named after Reitia.

== Bibliography ==
- Rex E. Wallace, "Venetic", in Roger D. Woodard, ed., The ancient languages of Europe (Cambridge, 2008; ISBN 0-521-68495-1), p. 124.
- Joachim Meffert, Die paläovenetische Votivkeramik aus dem Reitia-Heiligtum von Este-Baratella , 1998
- Marcel Detienne, The writing of Orpheus: Greek myth in cultural context (Johns Hopkins, 2002; ISBN 0-8018-6954-4), p. 126
- Adolphus Zavaroni, Ancient North Italian Inscriptions from Este, 2001
- Harald Meller, Die Fibeln aus dem Reitia-Heiligtum von Este (Ausgrabungen 1880-1916) / Le Fibule del Santuario di Reitia a Este (Scavi 1880-1916) (Nünnerich-Asmus Verlag, 2012; ISBN 978-3-943904-07-9)
- Sonja Ickler, Die Ausgrabungen im Reitia-Heiligtum von Este 1987-1991 / Gli Scavi 1987-1991 (Nünnerich-Asmus Verlag, 2013; ISBN 978-3-943904-17-8)
- R. Kotansky, ‘Incantations and prayers for salvation on inscribed Greek amulets’, in C.A. Faraone and D. Obbink (eds), Magika Hiera (New York 1991), pp. 112–13.
- M. MacLeod and B. Mees, 'runic amulets and magic objects', pp. 16–17
