= Baseggio Family =

Italian painter

The Baseggio Family included wood sculptors, painter, and an architect active mainly near Rovigo.

Giuseppe Baseggio (c. 1727 in Rovigo – August 2, 1775 in Senigallia) was an Italian wood sculptor, active in Northern Italy, mainly in Ferrara and Rovigo. He was part of a large family of artists, who included his father a wood sculptor, Sante Baseggio the Elder (died 1766), his brother the painter Massimino (1737-1813), and his son, the sculptor Sante Baseggio il Giovane. The elder Sante was born in Venice and moved to Rovigo, where he completed the statues of San Bartolomeo and San Benedetto in the church of the Madonna dei Sabbioni, as well as the wooden decoration of the main entrance of the church of the Madonna del Soccorso. From Rovigo he moved to Ferrara.

As a young man, Giuseppe after a few years in Ferrara moved back to his native Rovigo. There he completed the pulpit of the church of San Francesco and the statue of the Immaculate Conception for the church of the Concezione. Along with his brother, a painter of quadratura, he completed a number of processional statues and floats for local confraternities.

Of Giuseppe's three children: Antonio was an engineer, his daughter Anna was a Franciscan nun, but his youngest, Sante the younger (Ferrara, November 1, 1749-?) entered the main family trade of wood working. He had some training in Rome. He labored mainly in Rovigo from 1758 til after 1793. In this town, he helped fashion wooden decorations for the Convent of San Bartolomeo, furniture for the House of Milanovich, and in 1788, helped restore the façade of Teatro Roncale, now Manfredini. He also worked on the interior seating and stage. He created a baldacchino over the main altar of the parish church of Fratta. In 1792, he submitted a wooden model design for the construction of the future La Fenice theater in Venice; however, ultimately Giovanni Antonio Selva’s design was chosen.

Finally, one of Antonio Baseggio's children, also named Sante (1794-1861), was an engineer and architect in Rovigo. He appears to have worked (and is sometimes confused ) with his uncle, in the design and construction of the palazzo dell'Accademia dei Concordi (1814) and the neoclassical Teatro sociale (1818-1819, reconstructed after a fire in 1904).
