= Grignano Polesine =

Italian housing subdivision

Coordinates: 45°02′31″N 11°45′01″E

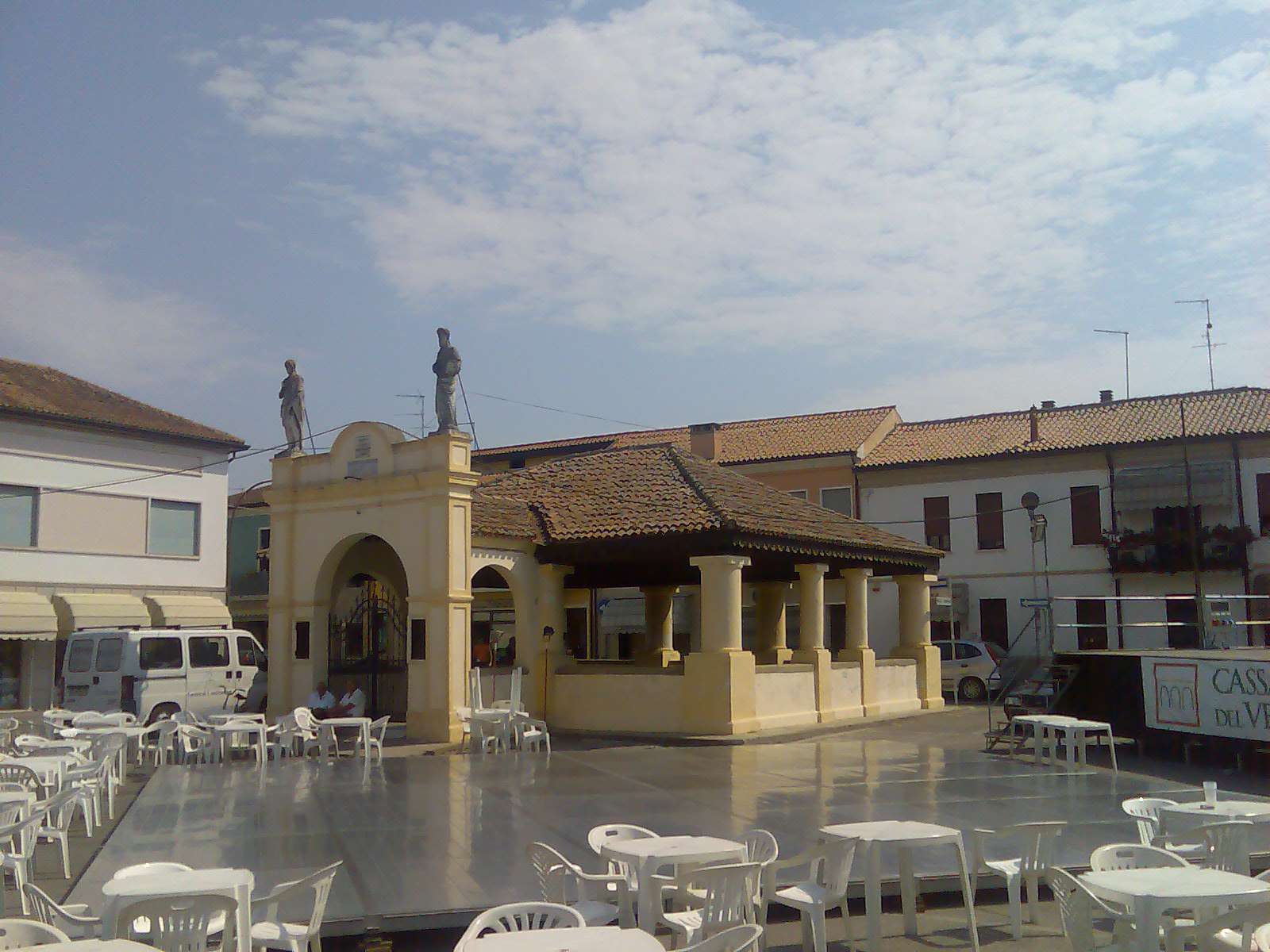
The Pavajon

Grignano Polesine is a frazione of Rovigo with 3,000 inhabitants. It is approximately 8 km south of the town centre.

With the name of Grignano di Polesine, assumed in 1867 after the precedent Grignano, it became an autonomous comune until 1927, when it became a frazione of Rovigo together with Boara Polesine, Borsea, Buso, Concadirame and Sant'Apollinare con Selva. The number of inhabitants, according to the past censi, was of 2,491 in 1871, 2,734 in 1881, 2,642 in 1901, 2,949 in 1911 and 3,186 in 1921.

== History ==
The first evidences of the originary built-up area of Grignano are documented by some papers of 938, related to a donation by the marquess Almerico and his wife Franca, in which they left all the possessions in the territory of Adria, the latters contained the village of Gragnano (the actual Grignano), together with other small agglomerates like Arquà Polesine, Borsea and Crespino, still present in the Polesine.

== Monuments and points of interest ==
- Chiesa Parrocchiale di Santa Maria Assunta e San Benedetto (Parish church of Santa Maria Assunta and San Benedetto)
- Chiesa di San Rocco (The Church of San Rocco)
- Il Pavajon

Each August, a town festival is held.
