= Adriatic Veneti =

Ancient people in modern-day Veneto

Ethnolinguistic map of Italy in the Iron Age, before the Roman expansion and conquest of Italy. Veneti are in brown.

The Veneti (sometimes also referred to as Venetici, Ancient Veneti or Paleoveneti to distinguish them from the modern-day inhabitants of the Veneto region, called Veneti in Italian) were an Indo-European people who inhabited northeastern Italy, in an area corresponding to the modern-day region of Veneto, from the middle of the 2nd millennium BC and developing their own original civilization along the 1st millennium BC.

The Veneti were initially attested in the area between Lake Garda and the Euganean Hills; later they expanded until they reached borders similar to those of the current Veneto region. According to the archaeological finds (which also agree with the written sources), the western borders of their territory ran along Lake Garda, the southern ones followed a line that starts from the Tartaro river, follows the Po and reaches Adria, along the extinct branch of the Po of Adria, while the eastern ones reached up to the Tagliamento river.

== Ethnonym ==
According to Julius Pokorný, the ethnonym Venetī (singular *Venetos) is derived from Proto Indo-European root *wen- 'to strive, to wish for, to love'. As shown by the comparative material, Germanic languages had two terms of different origin: Old High German Winida 'Wende' points to Pre-Germanic *Wenétos, while Lat.-Germ. Venedi (as attested in Tacitus) and Old English Winedas 'Wends' call for Pre-Germanic *Wenetós. The latter, according to Tacitus, who would have been familiar with Adriatic Veneti, connects the Vistula Veneti with the Slavs. Etymologically related words include Latin venus, -eris 'love, passion, grace'; Sanskrit vanas- 'lust, zest', vani- 'wish, desire'; Old Irish fine (< Proto-Celtic *venjā) 'kinship, kinfolk, alliance, tribe, family'; Old Norse vinr, Old Saxon, Old High German wini, Old Frisian, Old English wine 'friend'.

== Language ==
The ancient Veneti spoke Venetic, an extinct Indo-European language which is evidenced in approximately 300 short inscriptions dating from the 6th to 1st centuries BC. Venetic appears to share several similarities with Latin and the other Italic languages, but also has some affinities with other Indo-European languages, especially Germanic and Celtic.

Venetic should not be confused with Venetian, a Romance language presently spoken in the Veneto region.

== Geography ==
The extent of the territory occupied by the ancient Veneti before their incorporation by the Romans is uncertain. It included cities of the modern Veneto such as Este, Padua, Vicenza, Asolo, Oderzo, Montebelluna, Vittorio Veneto, Cadore, as well as other areas around the Po Delta. Venetic territory was incorporated into Cisalpine Gaul, and under Augustus was organized as the tenth region (Regio X Venetia et Histria) of Roman Italy. Regio X stretched geographically from the Arsia River in the east in Istria to the Abdua in the current Italian region of Lombardy and from the Alps to the Adriatic Sea.

== History ==
=== Classical sources ===
Middle Iron Age groups and cultures in North Central Italy.

Herodotus (c. 484–425 BC) at one point mentions the Veneti of the Adriatic (Histories V.9) and at another refers in passing to the "Eneti in Illyria" (Histories I.196) whose supposed marriage customs, he claims, mirrored those of the Babylonians. This led early scholars to seek to link the Veneti with the Illyrians. Their Illyrian origin is further strengthened by their close relationship with the inhabitants of the coastal regions of the Adriatic. Karl Pauli, a late 19th-century expert on the Venetic language, declared that the language was more closely related to that of the Illyrians than to any other language, even though knowledge of Venetic is limited to personal names, nouns, and verbs used in dedicatory formulae. There are even fewer remains of an Illyrian language which have been connected to the region and may indicate an Illyrian. However, this identification of the Adriatic Veneti as Illyrians has been discredited by many linguists. Hans Krahe and later Anton Mayer showed that Herodotus was not referring to the Adriatic Veneti, but to an Illyrian tribe that lived in the borderlands of northern historical Macedonia. Later linguistic and paleontological studies further solidified their findings.

Roman historian Titus Livius (59 BC–AD 17), himself a native of the Venetic town of Patavium, wrote that after the fall of Troy, the Trojan prince Antenor became the leader of the Paphlagonians after they all had been expelled from their homeland. Together, they migrated to the northern end of the Adriatic coast where they established a settlement, and conquered and merged with indigenous people known as the Euganei. The story connects the Veneti with the Paphlagonian Eneti, mentioned by Homer (750 BC).

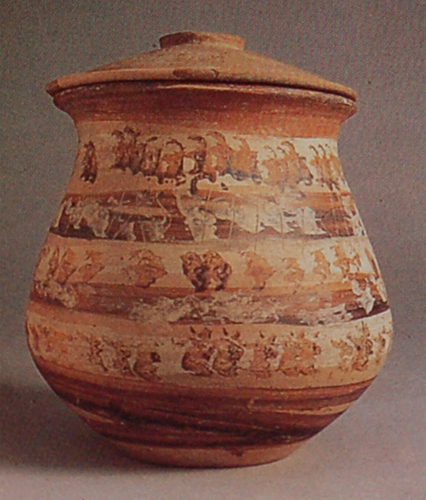
Venetic vase

Virgil (70-19 BC), in his epic the Aeneid, relates the same tradition. A commentary on Virgil's Aeneid by the grammarian Maurus Servius Honoratus (fl. c. AD 400) is said to imply a link between the Veneti and the Vindelici who are related to Liburnians from the Istrian Coast. However, the reference to the Veneti in Virgil seems to place them in the "innermost realm of the Liburnians" which must have been the goal at which Antenor is said to have arrived. This however implies only that the ancient Liburnians may have once encompassed a wide swath of the Eastern Alps, from Vindelicia, through Noricum, to the Dalmatian coast before the coming of the Veneti.

Pliny the Elder (AD 23–79) mentions that Cornelius Nepos (100–24 BC) implied that the Paphlagonian Eneti (Heneti) were ancestors of the Veneti of Italy. He lists the towns of Ateste, Acelum, Patavium, Opitergium, Belunum, and Vicetia as belonging to the Veneti.

By the 4th century BC the Veneti had been so Celticized that Polybius wrote that the Veneti of the 2nd century BC were identical to the Gauls except for their language. The Greek historian Strabo (64 BC–AD 24), on the other hand, conjectured that the Adriatic Veneti descended from Celts who in turn were related to the later Celtic tribe of the same name who lived on the coast of Brittany and fought against Julius Caesar. He further suggested that the identification of the Adriatic Veneti with the Paphlagonian Enetoi led by Antenor—which he attributes to Sophocles (496–406 BC)—was a mistake due to the similarity of the names. Strabo also gives information on the then-current domains of the Veneti.

=== Pre-Roman period ===
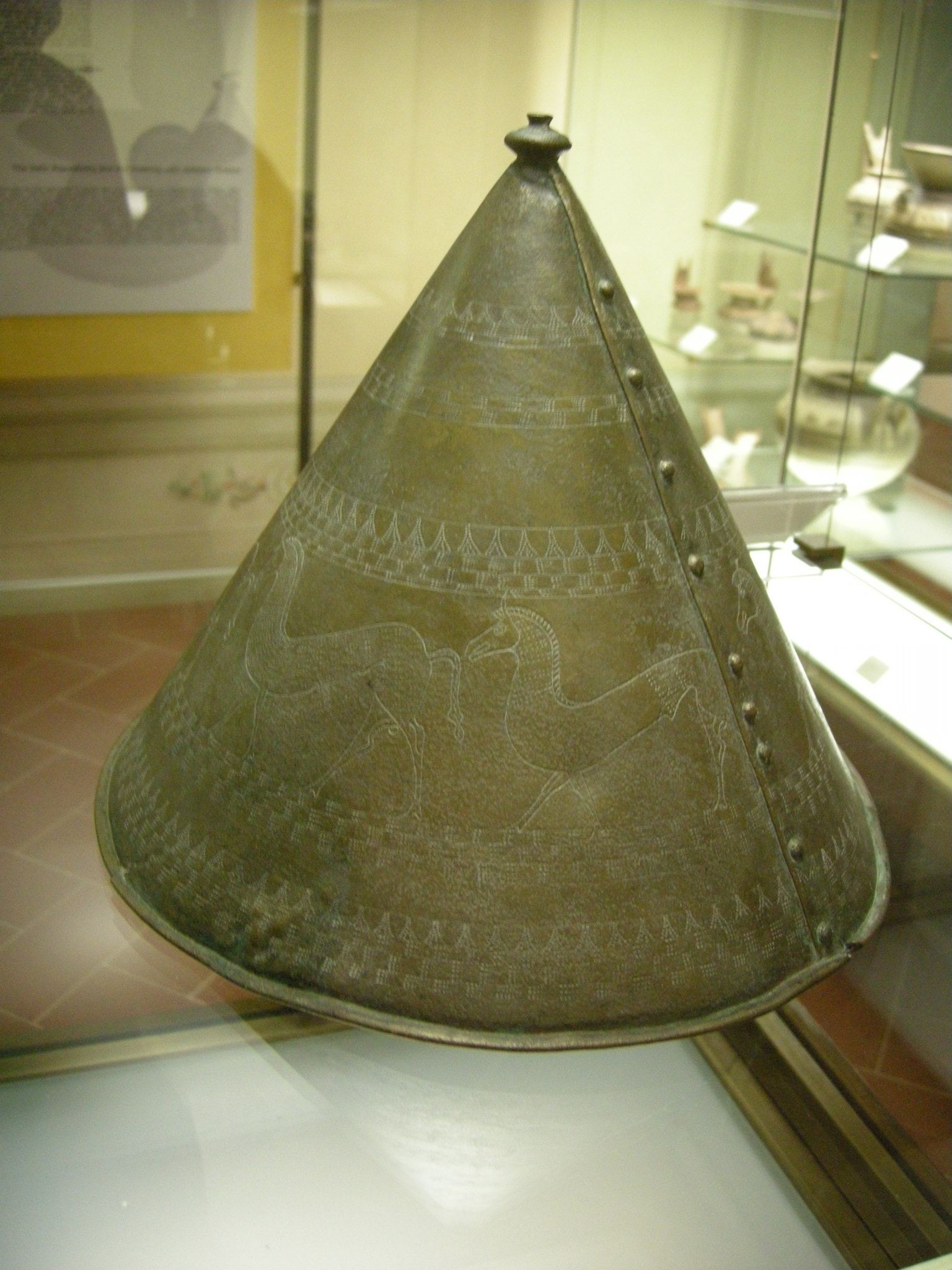
Venetic helmet

The territory of the Veneti came to the notice of the Greeks in the 4th c. BC. Strabo records that Dionysius I of Syracuse (c. 432–367 BC), desiring the famed horses of the Veneti, founded trading colonies along the Adriatic coast. The Sicilian tyrant favored the town of Adria as a trading partner, helping it build canals which linked it to the sea and broke the trading monopoly of Spina.

In 303/302 BC the Lacedaemonian prince Cleonymus of Sparta led a fleet of mercenaries up the Brenta River intending on sacking Patavium. However, the Veneti fought back and the Spartan ships were captured and destroyed.

The Veneti were in recurring conflict with the Celtic peoples who then occupied most of Northwestern Italy, although they maintained peaceful relations with the Cenomani Celts who had settled in and eventually absorbed the areas of Brescia and Verona.

=== Roman period ===
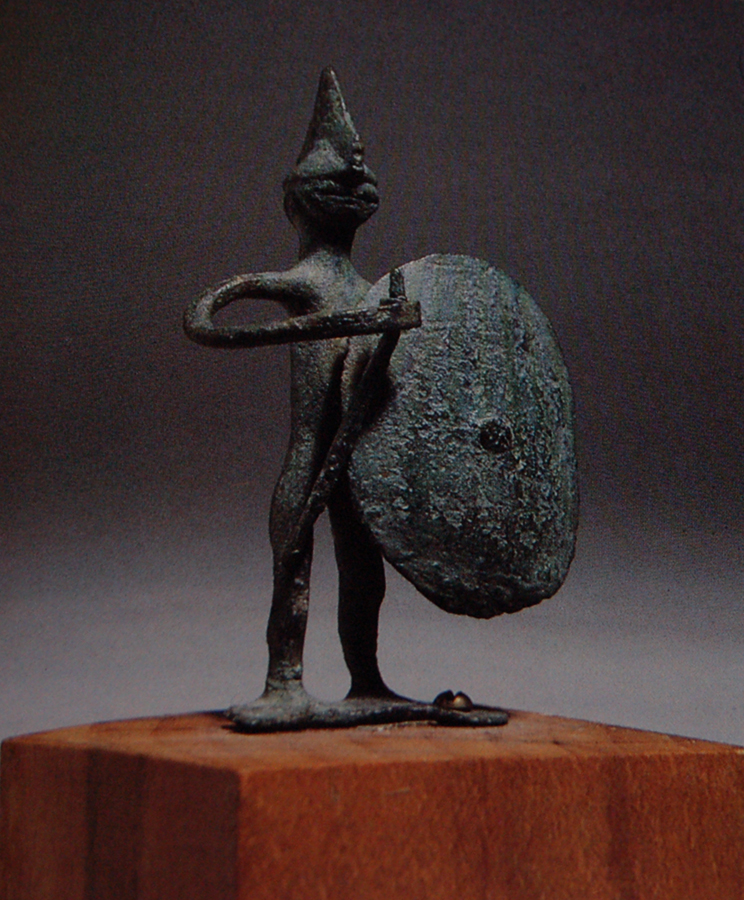
Venetic warrior

The Veneti seem to have begun contact with Rome in the third century BC. They established amicitia with Rome against the Gauls c. 238 BC. During the Second Punic War, the Veneti were again allied with the Romans against the Celts, Iberians, and the Carthaginian expedition (218–203 BC) led by Hannibal. Livy records that they sent soldiers to fight along with the Romans at the battle of Cannae.

With the foundation of the Latin colony of Aquileia by Rome in 181 BC and laying of the Via Postumia in 148 BC followed by the Via Annia in 131 BC, Roman influence among the Veneti increased. The Veneti seem to have voluntarily and gradually adopted the Latin language, Roman architecture, Roman city planning, and Roman religion. Votive offerings sometimes appear in the Venetic language written with the Roman alphabet or in Venetic with a Latin translation. Roman consuls were asked to adjudicate border disputes between Este and Padua in 141 and again in 135 BC and also a border dispute between Este and Vicenza. In 175 BC, Padua requested the aid of Rome in putting down a local civil war. The Veneti were given Latin rights after the Social War in the Lex Pompeia de Transpadanis and Roman citizenship in 49 BC in the Lex Roscia. Roman colonies established at Este, Concordia, and Trieste between 49 BC and 14 AD and at Oderzo and Zuglio during the reign of Claudius further contributed to the absorption of the Veneti into Roman culture.

== Beliefs ==
The equivalent of Apollo was Belenus in Veneto and Noricum. He had an oracle in the city of Aquileia and was worshipped as the divine protector of the town. Belenus was also connected with springs, which may suggest chthonic and medicinal powers. Belenus was most likely of Celtic origin, and the dominant god of the Norici.

== Archaeology ==
=== Periodization ===
	Dates	Description
Este I.	c. 900–750 BCE	Veneti settle the Po Valley where they encounter the Proto-Villanovan culture
Este II.	c. 750–575 BCE	Ossuary fibulae and bronze artifacts attest to growing dominance in the region with two main centers at Este and Padua, respectively
Este III.	c. 575–350 BCE	Venetic expansion throughout the Veneto and Friuli to the Adige, into the Piave Valley, and to Belluno
Este IV.	c. 350–182 BCE	Decline of Venetic culture; Veneti maintain their language and customs but are heavily influenced by Celts and Etruscans
Este V.	182 BCE–onward	Alliance with Rome leads to gradual Romanization

=== Findings ===
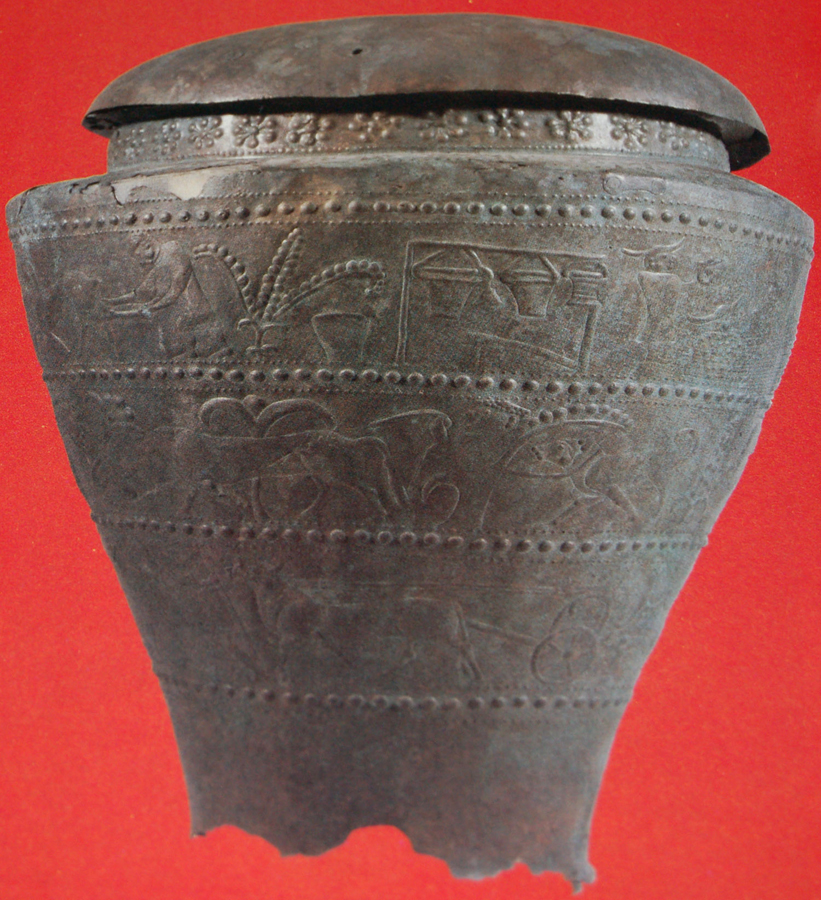
Venetic situla

Information about Venetic society can be deduced from artifacts, tombs, and religious votive objects. There were village heads. Wealthy landowners were buried with amber jewelry. The Veneti traded actively on the Amber Road.

There were horsemen and fishermen, and members involved in animal husbandry. In the 7th century BC merchants at Este used bronze coins, while by the 3rd century BC silver money was in use, especially at Padua. Farmers cultivated grain and grapes. Artisans produced ceramic and bronze objects, and wove wool cloth. Artifacts show that among the sports enjoyed were boxing and boat races.

During the fifth and fourth centuries BCE, Celtic migration into Italy increased significantly, primarily affecting the northwestern regions of the peninsula, but also extending into the Veneto. Celtic neighbours influenced aspects of Venetic dress, artistic expression, metalwork, and other material traditions. Some funerary sculpture and iconographic motifs show clear connections with the Celtic world. The Veneti also maintained extensive contact with Etruscan, Greek, and other central European communities.

The presence of Celtic names in the region, some of which appear to have been adapted to or combined with Venetic naming traditions, suggest intermarriage and cultural interaction between Celtic and Venetic communities. Examples of Celtic or mixed Celtic-Venetic names are attested at Altinum, Padua, and Este. Furthermore, an inscription from Altinum referring to a deity has been interpreted as evidence of a Celtic cult in the area.

== Studies ==
Many archaeological excavations are still under way in the Veneto today at sites such as Este, Padua, Oderzo, Adria, Vicenza, Verona and Altinum. Studies have explored the vast influence of the Greeks in the Adriatic and their interaction with the Veneti, particularly focusing on the Euboeans, Phocaeans and Corinthians. Furthermore, studies have also been done on Etruscan activity in the region and their strong links to the Veneti.

Modern surveys on the Veneti and other Ancient Italic peoples, including the Venetic inscriptions from Este, were published by A. L. Prosdocimi, A. M. C. Bianchi and L. Capuis.

=== Related tribes ===
Other tribes originally thought to have been Illyrians and shown to be actually related to the Veneti are: Histri, Carni, Catari, Catali, Liburni, Lopsi, Secusses, Venetulani.

== See also ==
- Veneti (disambiguation)
- Veneti (Gaul)
- Reitia
- Ancient peoples of Italy
- Prehistoric Italy
