= Venetic language =

Extinct Indo-European language of northeast Italy

Venetic
- Native to: Italy
- Region: Veneto
- Ethnicity: Adriatic Veneti
- Era: attested 6th–1st century BCE
- Language family: Indo-European: Italic (?) or para-Celtic (?); Venetic
- Writing system: Old Italic (Venetic alphabet), Latin

Language codes
- ISO 639-3: xve
- Glottolog: vene1257

Venetic (/vɪˈnɛtɪk/ vin-ET-ik) is an extinct centum Indo-European language that was spoken by the Veneti people in ancient times in northeast Italy (Veneto and Friuli) and part of modern Slovenia, between the Po Delta and the southern fringe of the Alps, associated with the Este culture. Venetic is generally considered a distinct branch of the Indo-European family, although its exact relationship to languages such as Latin, Germanic, Celtic, and other Italic languages is debated.

Its speakers are identified with the ancient people called Veneti by the Romans and Enetoi by the Greeks. It became extinct around the 1st century when the local inhabitants assimilated into the Roman sphere. Its wide distribution area led to the formation of several local varieties, such as Alpine Venetic, Este Venetic, and Padua Venetic.

The language is attested by over 300 short inscriptions dating from the 6th to the 1st century BCE. The inscriptions use a variety of the Northern Italic alphabet, similar to the Etruscan alphabet, introduced between 550 and 450 BC. The Latin alphabet used by the Romans, on the other hand, began to appear alongside the Venetic alphabet around 100 BC. Inscriptions dedicating offerings to Reitia constitute one of the primary sources of knowledge of the Venetic language.

== Linguistic classification ==
Ethnolinguistic map of Italy in the Iron Age, before the Roman expansion and conquest of Italy. Venetic is in brown.

The precise position of Venetic within the Indo-European language family remains debated. Venetic shows notable affinities with several languages of the northern Adriatic, and a possible relationship with Liburnian language has been proposed, although the limited evidence for Liburnian makes the nature of this relationship uncertain.

Venetic is sometimes classified as closely related to Proto-Italic within a Proto-Italo-Venetic group, while other classifications place it within the Italic language family. In particular, Eric P. Hamp argued in 1954 that Venetic was more closely affiliated with the Latino-Faliscan group than with the Osco-Umbrian/Sabellic group. However, some linguists suggest, in view of the divergent verbal system, that it was not part of Italic proper, but split off from the core of Italic early.

Since Venetic also shared similarities with other Western Indo-European branches (particularly Celtic languages and Germanic languages), some linguists prefer to consider it an independent Indo-European branch, that separated relatively early from the lineage leading to Proto-Italic, or from a broader Italo-Celtic–related western Indo-European continuum. Venetic may also have been related to the Illyrian languages once spoken in the western Balkans, but this hypothesis is rejected by most specialists today.

The linguist Hans Kuhn hypothesized, based in particular on toponymy, hydronymy, anthroponymy, and substrate vocabulary, that the population of the so-called Nordwestblock (the prehistoric linguistic and cultural area comprising parts of present-day Netherlands, Belgium, northern France, and northwestern Germany) was neither strictly Germanic nor Celtic, but rather spoke a language closely related to Venetic, or perhaps a northern variant of the same broader linguistic group.

Gvozdanović argues that Venetic preserves characteristics making it significantly similar to Celtic, particularly regarding grammatical structure and the inflectional system, while occupying an intermediate position between Celtic and Italic in certain aspects of its phonological system. However, the phonological similarities could have developed through prolonged contact among speakers of Venetic, Celtic, and Italic languages. Phonological similarities to Rhaetian have also been pointed out.

In 2016, Celtologist Peter Schrijver argued that Venetic and Italic together form one sub-branch of an Italo-Celtic branch of Indo-European, the other sub-branch being Celtic.

== Decline ==
During the period of Latin-Venetic bilingual inscriptions in the Roman script, i.e. 150–50 BCE, Venetic became flooded with Latin loanwords. The shift from Venetic to Latin resulting in language death is thought by scholarship to have already been well under way by that time.

== Features ==
Venetic had about six, possibly seven, noun cases and four conjugations (similar to Latin). About 60 words are known, but some were borrowed from Latin (liber.tos. < libertus) or Etruscan. Many of them show a clear Indo-European origin, such as vhraterei < PIE *bʰréh₂trey = to the brother.

== Phonological development ==
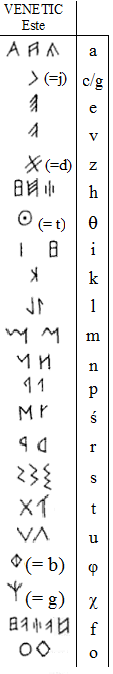
Venetic alphabet

- Venetic appears to showcase the shift of voiced aspirates to voiceless fricatives word-initially and voiced stops word-medially. Such a development is also probable for Italic, which perhaps implies that Venetic belongs to the Italic clade.
  - Word-initial developments:
    - *bʰ > f. Such a sound change is indicated by terms such as fouxontia, a personal name that may reflect PIE *bʰewg- ("to flee").
    - *dʰ > f. This sound development also likely occurred in Venetic, as indicated by forms such as vhagsto (/faɡsto/, "offered").
    - *gʰ > h. Perhaps attested in the term horeionte ("congratulating, glad"?), which reflects PIE *gʰer-.
  - Word-medial developments:
    - *bʰ > b. Attested in louderobos (dat.pl., "for the children"), from PIE *h₁léwdʰerobʰos.
    - *dʰ > d. Also attested in louderobos.
- Development of labiovelars:
  - *kʷ was preserved, as in Latin. Such a sound development is indicated by forms such as the enclitic -kve ("and"), which is related to Latin -que.
  - *ḱw merges with *kʷ, also as in Latin. Such a sound change is attested in ekvon ("horse"), from PIE *h₁éḱwos ("horse").
  - *gʷ > v, as in Latin. This sound change is attested in vivoi (dat.sg., "alive"), from PIE *gʷih₃wós.
- Venetic may have undergone Thurneysen–Havet's law, a development also found in Italic whereby PIE *owV yielded awV in pretonic position. For evidence of this development in Venetic, the linguist Michael Weiss adduces the personal name hostihavos (< *gʰosti-gʷʰowós) and also the Latin river names Plavis and Dravus, both of which—according to Weiss—may have been borrowed from Venetic. There is some possible counterevidence for the existence of this sound law in Venetic, particularly the terms klovetlo and iustovoi, which both showcase owV sequences. To explain these apparent discrepancies, Weiss that they may have undergone a development of PIE *ew > ow, which is also an Italic sound development.
- Venetic may have undergone the development of PIE *ew > ow, a sound change also attested for Italic. This sound law is primarily supported by forms such as louderobos and louderai (dat.sg.f., "for the daughter"), both of which reflect the PIE root *h₁lewdʰ- ("to grow; people"), as well as vhougonta and vhougontiioi, which may continue PIE *bʰewg- ("to enjoy"). However, there are numerous personal names of Venetic origin attested in Latin inscriptions that appear to showcase preserved *ew sequences, such as Clevius or Leucinae, which contradicts the operation of such a sound law. Weiss notes that the forms klovetlo and iustovoi both appear on late Venetic texts dating to the 2nd and 1st centuries BCE respectively, whereas certain terms that appear to showcase the preservation of *ew—such as tevebos—date to the 5th-4th centuries BCE. On this basis, Weiss suggests that the sound change occurred around the 3rd-2nd centuries BCE, perhaps due to encroaching Romanization, and it may not have affected all dialects of Venetic.

== Language sample ==
A sample inscription in Venetic, found on a bronze nail at Este (Es 45):

Venetic	Mego donasto śainatei Reitiiai porai Egeotora Aimoi ke louderobos
Latin (literal)	Me donavit sanatrici Reitiae bonae Egetora [pro] Aemo liberis-que
English	Egetora gave me to Good Reitia the Healer on behalf of Aemus and the children

Another inscription, found on a situla (vessel such as an urn or bucket) at Cadore (Ca 4 Valle):

Venetic	eik Goltanos doto louderai Kanei
Latin (literal)	hoc Goltanus dedit liberae Cani
English	Goltanus sacrificed this for the free Kanis

== Scholarship ==
The most prominent scholars who have deciphered Venetic inscriptions or otherwise contributed to the knowledge of the Venetic language are Pauli, Krahe, Pellegrini, Prosdocimi, and Lejeune. Recent contributors include Capuis and Bianchi.

== See also ==
- Adriatic Veneti
- Castellieri culture
- Illyrian languages
- Indo-European languages
- Italic languages
- Italo-Celtic
- Liburnian language
- Proto-Celtic language
- Venetian language
- Wave model
