= Adria (river) =

Former river in northern Italy

Coordinates: 45°02′52″N 12°04′01″E

Adria (Greek: Ἀδρίας) was a former channel of the Po river delta, passing by the town of Adria, that ceased in the 1st century BC.

This river was mentioned by Hecataeus, by Theopompus and by Ptolemy. (Note: Ἀτριανὸς ποταμός, that is "Atrian river".)

Hecataeus asserts that the Adriatic sea and the town of Adria were named after this river.

== History ==
Between the 12th and the 9th century BC, the mainstream of the Po followed this channel; its course followed more or less today's system of the Fissero-Tartaro-Canalbianco canals and flowed into the Adriatic Sea by the site of Adria town. At that time, the coastline was far more upriver than nowadays. The first hamlets of Adria were settled by the Veneti; also the settlement of Frattesina, near modern Fratta Polesine, was active by this river during these centuries.

During the 9th or 8th century BC, the main stream of the Po River changed, due to the "breach at Sermide", and followed a channel more to the south, the Spina river. The Etruscans dug canals to drain the "Adrian swamps" (the swamps that surrounded Adria); the Tartaro river was diverted north-east into the Philistina canal. Other canals (the fossiones) were dug parallel to the coastline to allow inland navigation. The town of Adria and its port on the Adria river flourished in the 6th century BC. New settlements were founded on dry land, inland from the sea, up the Adria and lesser streams.

The Adria river was still active while the Greeks settled the area in the 4th century BC, ruled by Dionysius I of Syracuse and his son Dionysius II. The Greeks also maintained the drainage canals, though imposing on them Greek river names. For instance, Philistina is from Philistus. The Adria channel survived the Gauls period, and was still there when the Romans arrived. In the first century AD, Pliny the Elder however does not write of this Adria river; the Adige overflowed into the Tartaro-Philistina and caused a flood in the area that returned to wetlands. The port of Adria was still working thanks to the fossiones and the other canals, still maintained by the Romans. The sources of Pliny most probably referred to a previous state of the territory, so it is almost certain that the Adria channel ceased to exist before or about the 1st century BC.
