= Tartaro-Canalbianco-Po di Levante =

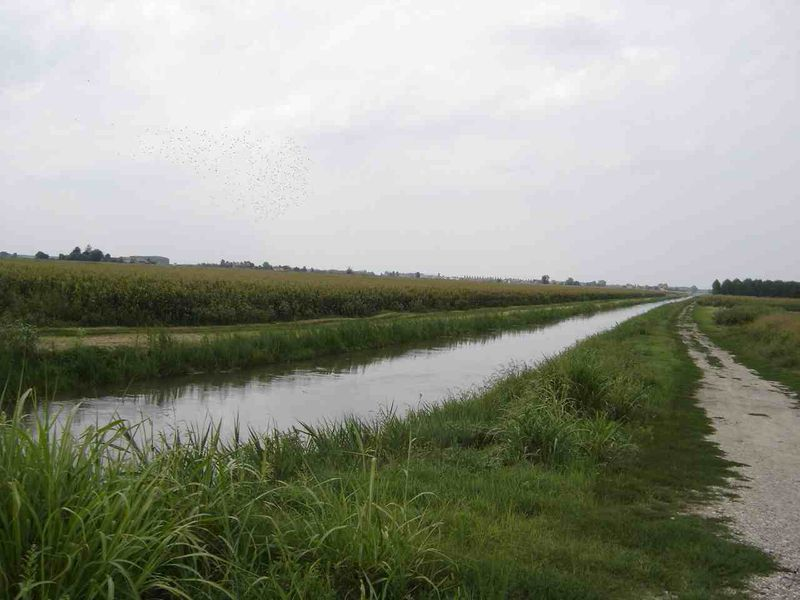
- The river Tartaro near the church of Santa Maria Maggiore at Gazzo Veronese.

Location
- Country: Italy

Physical characteristics
- Source
  - location: Povegliano Veronese, Italy
  - elevation: 47 m (154 ft) msl
- Mouth: Adriatic Sea
  - location: Porto Levante, near Porto Viro
  - coordinates: 45°03′03″N 12°21′50″E
  - elevation: 0 m (0 ft)
- Length: 147 km (91 mi)
- Basin size: 2,885 km^{2} (1,114 sq mi)
- Discharge
  - average: 218.40 m^{3}/s (7,713 cu ft/s)

Tartaro-Canalbianco-Po di Levante (Latin: Tartarus) is a river of north-east Italy. It is the only river whose course runs between the Adige river and the Po river and flows into the Adriatic Sea.

The first part of its course, whose length is 52 kilometres (32 mi) from resurgences to Torretta, flows in the province of Verona and in the province of Mantua and is known by the name of Tartaro. The second part of its course, whose length is 78 kilometres (48 mi) from Torretta to Volta Grimana, flows in the province of Rovigo and is known by the name of Canalbianco or Canal Bianco (meaning White Canal in both Italian and Venetian). The third and final part of its course, whose length is 17 kilometres (11 mi) from Volta Grimana to mouth, flows in the province of Rovigo and is known by the name of Po di Levante (meaning Eastern Po).

The river rises from resurgences in the hills to the southeast of the Lago di Garda and its former lower course roughly followed what is currently the lower course of the Adigetto Canal until the breach at Pinzone in the 10th century.

Since the breach at Pinzone the lower course of the Tartaro has roughly followed what was the former lower course of the Mincio river and, probably, of the ancient Adria river. After the breach at Ficarolo in 1152 the Po river diverted to the north and the Tartaro river became one of its tributaries.

After the Malopera breach in 1438 the Tartaro overflowed and new embankments were built, roughly following the previous natural course; This part of the river has been known by the name of Canalbianco since the canalization of its stream.

The "Porto Viro cut-off" in 1604 diverted the Po river before the confluence of the Tartaro-Canalbianco; since then the former channel of the Po delta named Po di Levante has been the final part of the river.

Currently it flows by the modern Adria; it communicates, by canals, with the Po river and the Adige river.
