= Adria =

- Comune
- Città di Adria
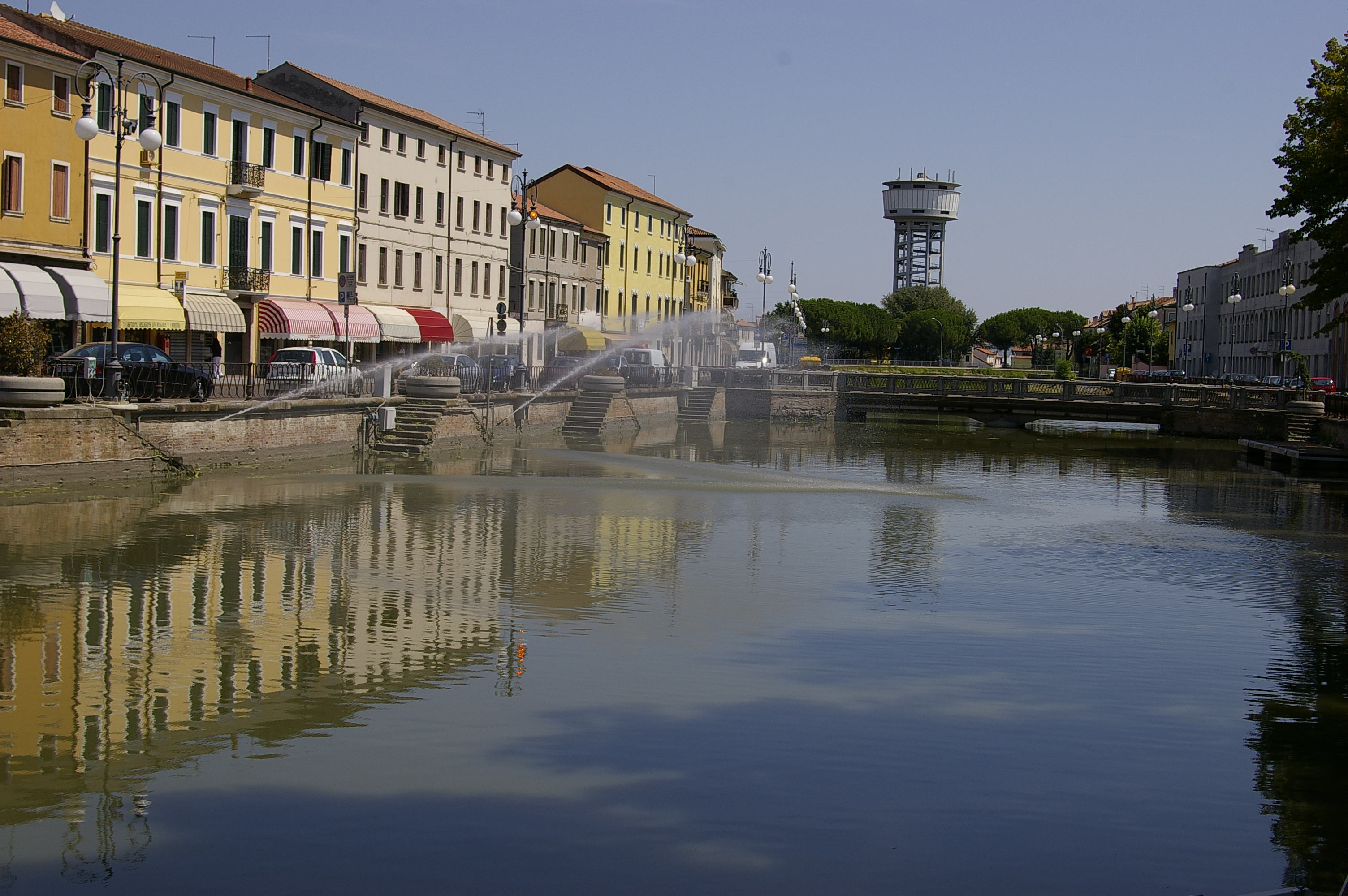
- Canal Bianco

- Coat of arms

- Location of Adria in Italy Adria (Veneto)
- Coordinates: 45°03′N 12°03′E
- Country: Italy
- Region: Veneto
- Province: Rovigo (RO)
- Frazioni: Baricetta, Bellombra, Bottrighe, Ca' Emo, Campelli, Canareggio, Canton, Canton Basso, Capitello, Case Beviacqua, Case Matte, Ca'Tron, Cavanella Po, Cavedon, Chiavica Pignatta, Corcrevà, Curicchi, Fasana Polesine, Fienile Santissimo, Forcarigoli, Isolella, Mazzorno Sinistro, Montefalche, Palazzon, Passetto, Piantamelon, Sabbioni, San Pietro Basso, Tiro A Segno, Valliera, Voltascirocco

Government
  - Mayor: Omar Barbierato

Area
  - Total: 113.5 km^{2} (43.8 sq mi)
- Elevation: 4 m (13 ft)

Population (30 April 2017)
  - Total: 19,543
  - Density: 172.2/km^{2} (446.0/sq mi)
- Demonym: Adriesi
- Time zone: UTC+1 (CET)
  - Summer (DST): UTC+2 (CEST)
- Postal code: 45011
- Dialing code: 0426
- Patron saint: Saints Peter and Paul
- Saint day: 29 June
- Website: Official website

Adria is a town and comune in the province of Rovigo in the Veneto region of northern Italy, situated between the mouths of the rivers Adige and Po. The remains of the Etruscan city of Atria or Hatria are to be found below the modern city, three to four metres below the current level. Adria and Spina were the Etruscan ports and depots for Felsina (now Bologna). Adria may have received its name from the Adriatic Sea or from the river Adria that once passed nearby.

== History ==
=== Ancient era ===
The first settlements built in the area are of Venetic origin, during the twelfth to ninth centuries BC, consisting of stilt houses in the wetlands, that were then still close to the sea. At that time the main stream of the Po, the Adria channel, flowed into the sea in this area. The Villanovan culture, named for an archaeological site at the village of Villanova, near Bologna (Etruscan Felsina), flourished in this area from the tenth until as late as the sixth century BC. The foundations of classical Atria are dated from 530 to 520 BC.

The Etruscans built the port and settlement of Adria after the channel gradually started to run dry. During the later period of the sixth century BC the port continued to flourish. The Etruscan-controlled area of the Po Valley was generally known as Padanian Etruria, as opposed to their main concentration along the Tyrrhenian coast south of the Arno.

Greeks from Aegina and later from Syracuse by Dionysius I colonised the city making it into an emporion. Greeks had been trading with the Veneti from the sixth century BC at least, especially the amber, originally coming from the Baltic sea.

Mass Celtic incursions into the Po valley resulted in friction between the Gauls and Etruscans and intermarriage, attested by epigraphic inscriptions on which Etruscan and Celtic names appear together. The city was populated by Etruscans, Veneti, Greeks and Celts.

Pliny the Elder, a Roman author and fleet commander, wrote about a system of channels in Atria that was, "first made by the Tuscans [i.e. Etruscans], thus discharging the flow of the river across the marshes of the Atriani called the Seven Seas, with the famous harbor of the Tuscan town of Atria which formerly gave the name of Atriatic to the sea now called the Adriatic". Those "Seven Seas" were interlinked coastal lagoons, separated from the open sea by sand spits and barrier islands. The Etruscans extended this natural inland waterway with new canals to extend the navigation possibilities of the tidal reaches of the Po all the way north to Atria. As late as the time of the emperor Vespasian, shallow draft galleys could still be rowed from Ravenna into the heart of Etruria. Under Roman occupation the town ceded importance to Ravenna as the continued siltation of the Po delta carried the seafront further to the east. The sea is now about 22 kilometres (14 miles) from Adria.

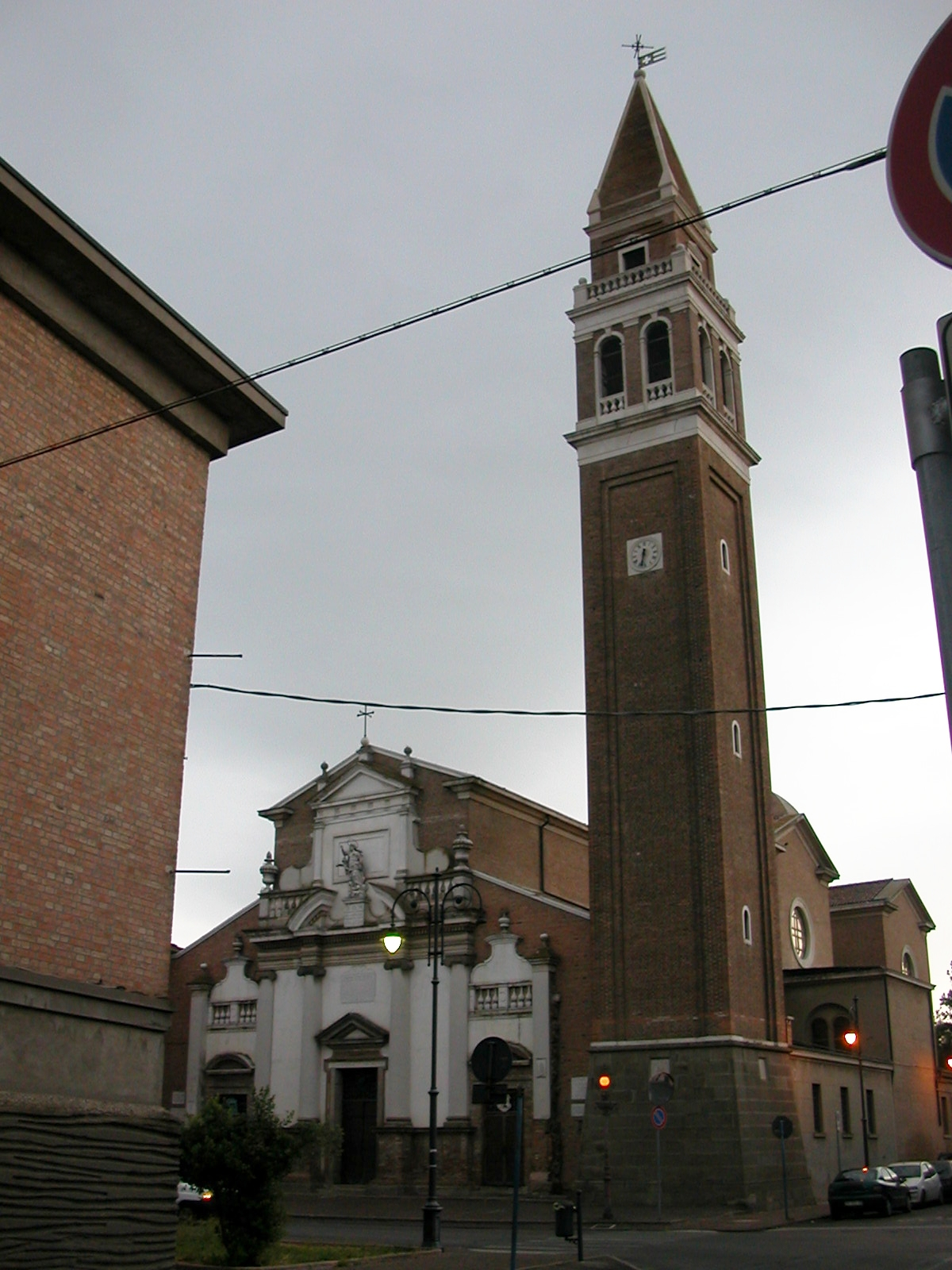
The former cathedral Santa Maria Assunta della Tomba

The first exploration of ancient Atria was carried out by Carlo Bocchi and published as Importanza di Adria la Veneta. The collections of the Bocchi family were given to the public at the beginning of the 20th century and comprise a major part of the city museum collection of antiquities.

There are several ideas concerning the etymology of the ancient toponym Adria/Atria. One theory is that it derives from the Illyrian (Venetic language) word adur "water, sea".

=== Medieval and modern age ===
At the time of the fall of the Western Roman Empire, the port of Adria had lost most of its importance. It finally declined after the total change of the local hydrography in 589, following the catastrophic flood documented by Paul the Deacon, and Adria became a fief of the archdiocese of Ravenna.

After a period as an independent commune, it was a possession of the Este of Ferrara and, in the 16th century, of the Republic of Venice. At that time Adria was a small village surrounded by malaria-plagued marshes. It recovered its importance when Polesine was reclaimed in the same century.

During the Napoleonic Wars it was first under France, then under Austria, to which it was assigned in 1815 after the Congress of Vienna, as part of Lombardy-Venetia.

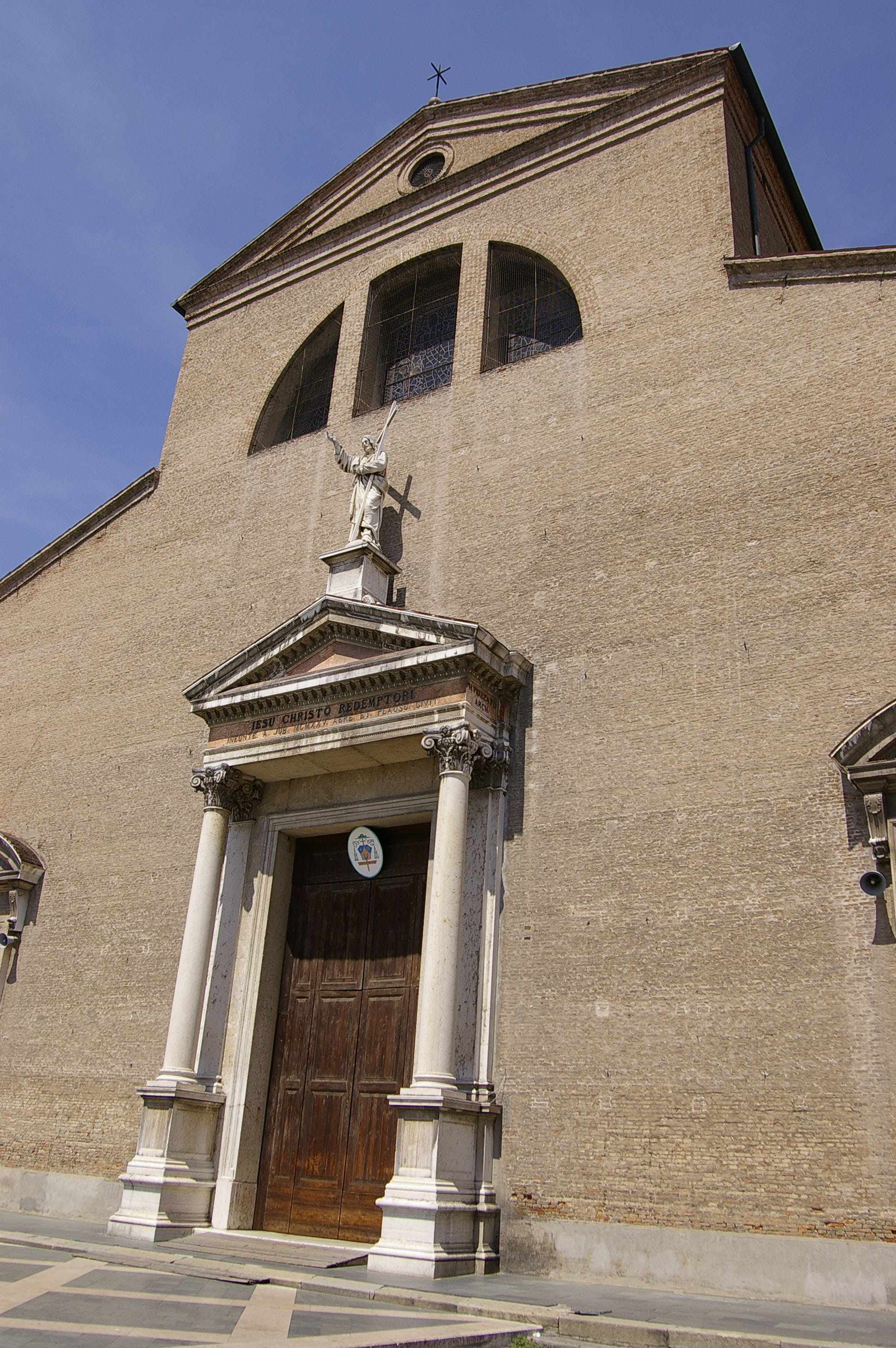
The New Cathedral

== Notable people ==
- Guido Barbujani, population geneticist and evolutionary biologist, born in Adria in 1955
- Giovanni Marinelli (1879-1944), Fascist politician, member of the Grand Council of Fascism and Undersecretary of State for Communications of the Kingdom of Italy from 1941 to 1943

== Main sights ==
- Church of Santa Maria Assunta della Tomba (formerly the cathedral), of medieval origin but rebuilt in 1718. It houses an octagonal baptismal font from the 7th or 8th century, with the carved name of the 3rd bishop of Adria, Bono. Other artworks include several 15th and 16th century paintings, and, in the chapel, a terracotta relief depicting a Dormitio Virginis, attributed to Michele da Firenze.
- Adria Cathedral, the New Cathedral (Cattedrale Nuova dei Santi Petro i Paulo), dedicated to Saints Peter and Paul
- Museo Archeologico Nazionale di Adria

== Twin towns – sister cities ==
Adria is twinned with:

- Ermont, France
- Lampertheim, Germany
- Maldegem, Belgium
- Rovinj, Croatia, since 1982

== See also ==
- Bishopric of Adria
