= History of the Tatars =

History of the Tatars may refer to:

- History of Tatarstan
- History of the Tartars (disambiguation)
