= Aeschremon conchylialis =

Scientific classification
- Domain: Eukaryota
- Kingdom: Animalia
- Phylum: Arthropoda
- Class: Insecta
- Order: Lepidoptera
- Family: Crambidae
- Genus: Aeschremon
- Species: A. conchylialis

Binomial name
- Aeschremon conchylialis (Christoph, 1872)

Synonyms
- Anthophilodes conchylialis Christoph, 1872

Species of moth

Aeschremon conchylialis is a species of moth in the family Crambidae. It is found in Southern Russia.
