= Azelino culture =

Archaeological culture in Russia

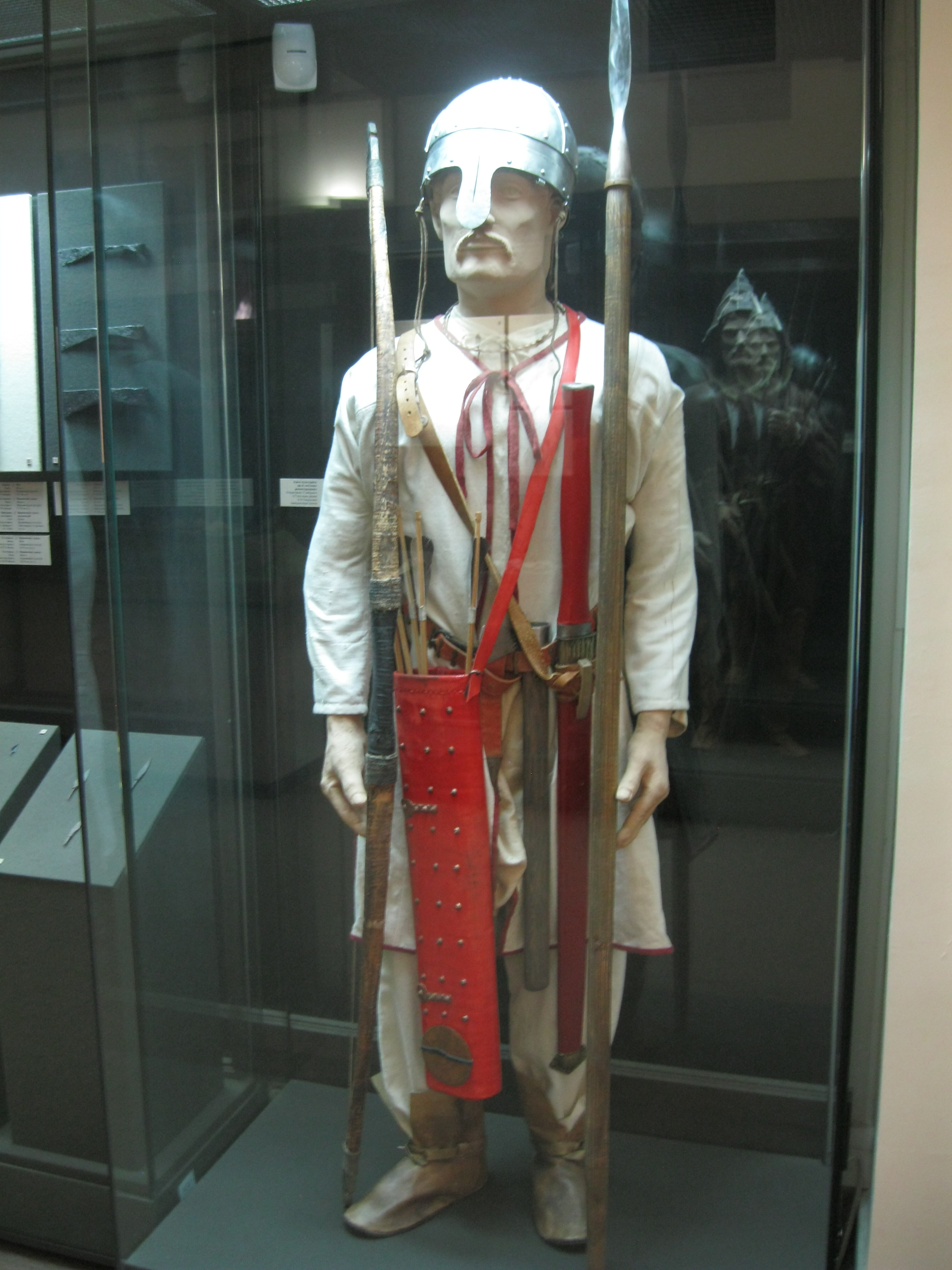
- Reconstruction of Azelino costume, National Museum of Tatarstan
- Geographical range: Volga region
- Period: Late Iron Age
- Dates: 3rd–5th centuries AD
- Preceded by: Ananyino culture; Gorodets culture; Pjanobor culture
- Followed by: Ancient Mari culture Polom culture
- Defined by: V. F. Gening (1963)

The Azelino culture is an archaeological culture associated with the Volga region of Russia. They were located in the western part of the Lower Kama and the Vyatka regions, and were descendants of the Pjanobor culture.

There are around 50 Azelino archaeological sites, primarily consisting of burial grounds. Azelino sites are located along major rivers, and are characterized by specialized arrowheads, apiculture knives, and burials of dogs and riding horses. The Azelino population largely relied on forest resources.

V. F. Gening identified the Azelino culture in 1963, and theorized that the Pjanobor culture had migrated to the Vyatka valley in the 3rd century AD. He defined the Azelino culture as the late Pjanobor sites of the 3rd–5th centuries. Comingling of the Azelino with the existing populations in the Vyatka area, descendents of the Ananyino and perhaps Gorodets cultures, eventually resulted in the ethnogenesis of the Meadow Mari people. The precise role of the Azelino, Gorodets, and Ananyino cultures in Mari ethnogenesis has been subject to academic debate.

Between the 2nd and 4th centuries, the Late Sarmatians, eastern Kyiv culture, and the Lbische culture migrated into the region. At the same time, Azelino settlement became more widespread. Late Sarmatian artifacts also became widely used in the Azelino culture.

A burial site near the village of Stary Uzyum in Tatarstan has been identified with the later Azelino culture and dated to the 6th century.

According to archaeologist R. D. Goldina, Gening was incorrect in his assessment of Azelino as a distinct culture from Pjanobor.
