= Iron Age Europe =

Last stage of the prehistoric period and the first of the protohistoric periods

In Europe, the Iron Age is the last stage of the prehistoric period and the first of the protohistoric periods, which initially meant descriptions of a particular area by Greek and Roman writers. For much of Europe, the period came to an abrupt end after conquest by the Romans, though ironworking remained the dominant technology until recent times. Elsewhere, the period lasted until the early centuries AD, and either Christianization or a new conquest in the Migration Period. Iron working was introduced to Europe in the late 11th century BC, probably from the Caucasus, and slowly spread northwards and westwards over the succeeding 500 years. For example, the Iron Age of Prehistoric Ireland begins around 500 BC, when the Greek Iron Age had already ended, and finishes around 400 AD. The use of iron and iron-working technology became widespread concurrently in Europe and Asia.

The start of the Iron Age is marked by new cultural groupings, or at least terms for them, with the Late Bronze Age Mycenaean Greece collapsing in some confusion, while in Central Europe the Urnfield culture had already given way to the Hallstatt culture. In north Italy the Villanovan culture is regarded as the start of Etruscan civilization. Like its successor La Tène culture, Hallstatt is regarded as Celtic. Further to the east and north, and in Iberia and the Balkans, there are a number of local terms for the early Iron Age culture. Roman Iron Age is a term used in the archaeology of Northern Europe (but not Britain) for the period when the unconquered peoples of the area lived under the influence of the Roman Empire.

The Iron Age in Europe is characterized by an elaboration of designs in weapons, implements, and utensils. These are no longer cast but hammered into shape, and decoration is elaborate curvilinear rather than simple rectilinear; the forms and character of the ornamentation of the northern European weapons resemble Roman arms in some respects, while in other respects they are peculiar and evidently representative of northern art.

== Timeline ==
Dates are approximate, consult particular article for details
Prehistoric (or Proto-historic) Iron Age Historic Iron Age

== Eastern Europe ==
The early first millennium BC marks the Iron Age in Eastern Europe. In the Pontic steppe and the Caucasus region, the Iron Age begins with the Koban and the Chernogorovka and Novocherkassk cultures from c. 900 BC. By 800 BC, it was spreading to Hallstatt culture via the alleged "Thraco-Cimmerian" migrations.

Along with the Chernogorovka and Novocherkassk cultures, on the territory of ancient Russia and Ukraine the Iron Age is, to a significant extent, associated with Scythians, who developed iron culture since the 7th century BC. The majority of remains of their iron-producing and blacksmithing industries from the 5th to 3rd centuries BC was found near Nikopol in Kamenskoye Gorodishche, which is believed to be the specialized metallurgic region of the ancient Scythia.

The Old Iron Age was an era of immense changes in the lands inhabited by the Balts, i.e. the territories from the Vistula Lagoon and the Baltic Sea in the west to the Oka in the east, and between the Middle Dnieper in the south and northern Latvia to the north. In the first century A.D., the Baltic people began mass production of iron from the available limonite, widely available in swamps. The local smiths learned to harden iron into steel, which resulted in tougher weapons than stone or horn instruments.

== Southeast Europe ==
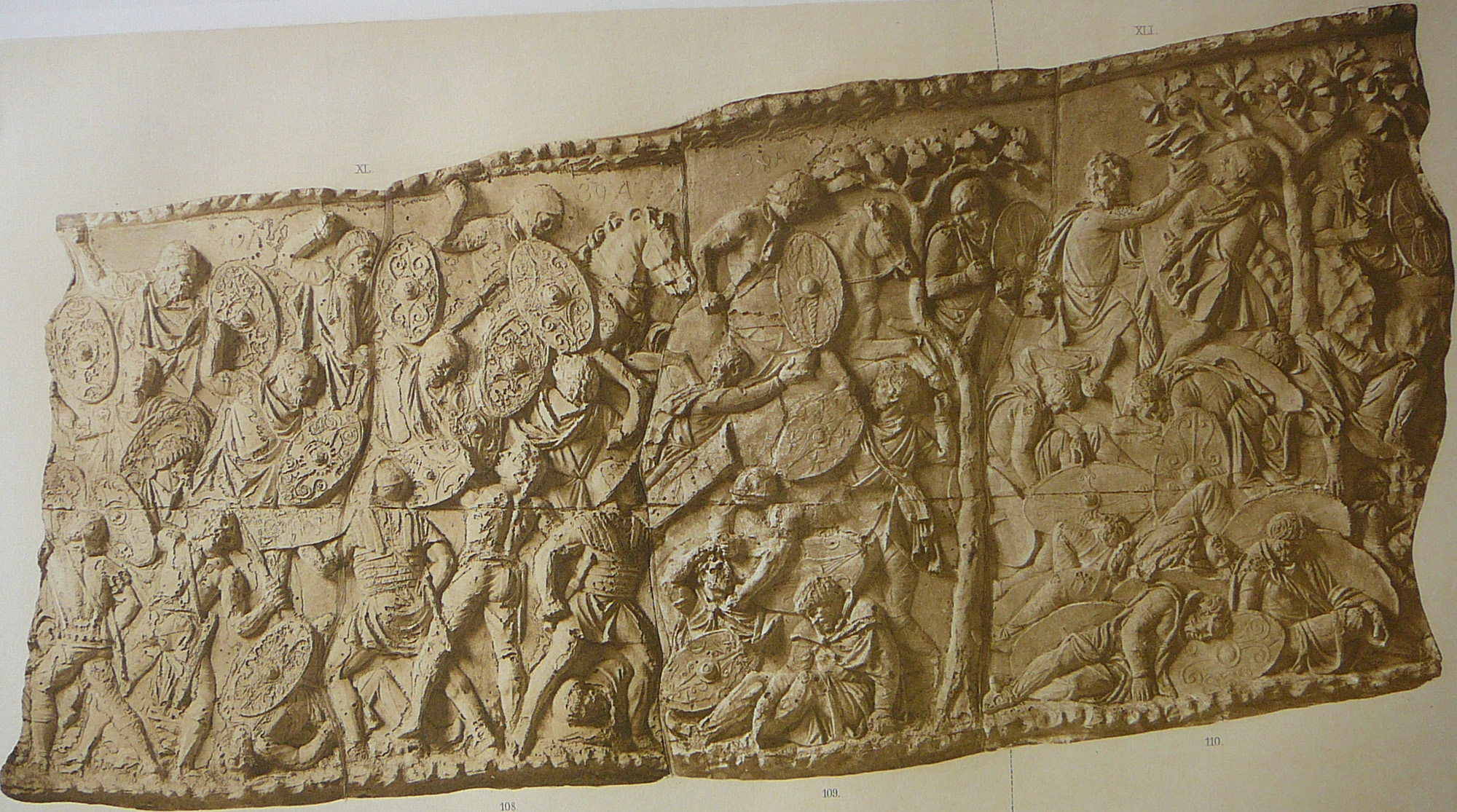
Battle scene between the Roman and Dacian armies, Trajan's Column, Rome

In the Greek Dark Ages, edged iron weapons were widely available, but a variety of explanations fits the available archaeological evidence. From around 1200 BC, the palace centers and outlying settlements of the Mycenaean culture began to be abandoned or destroyed, and by 1050 BC, the recognizable cultural features (such as Linear B script) had disappeared.

The Greek alphabet began in the 8th century BC. It is descended from the Phoenician alphabet. The Greeks adapted the system, notably introducing characters for vowel sounds and thereby creating the first truly alphabetic (as opposed to abjad) writing system. As Greece sent colonists eastwards, across the Black Sea, and westwards towards Sicily and Italy (Pithekoussae, Cumae), the influence of their alphabet extended further. The ceramic Euboean artifact inscribed with a few lines written in the Greek alphabet referring to "Nestor's Cup", discovered in a grave at Pithekoussae (Ischia) dates from c. 730 BC; it seems to be the oldest written reference to the Iliad. The fragmentary Epic Cycles, a collection of Ancient Greek epic poems that related the story of the Trojan War, were a distillation in literary form of an oral tradition developed during the Greek Dark Age. The traditional material from which the literary epics were drawn treats the Mycenaean Bronze Age culture from the perspective of the Iron Age and later Greece.

Notable and autochthonous groups of peoples and tribes of Southeastern Europe organised themselves in large tribal unions such as the Thracian Odrysian kingdom in the east of Southeastern Europe in the 5th century BC. By the 6th century BC the first written sources dealing with the territory north of the Danube appear in Greek sources. By this time the Getae (and later the Daci) had branched out from the Thracian-speaking populations.

== Central Europe ==
Bronze Age Central Europe
Bell Beaker	2600–2200 BC
Bz A	2200–1600 BC
Bz B	1600–1500 BC
Bz C	1500–1300 BC
Bz D	1300–1200 BC
Ha A	1200–1050 BC
Ha B	1050–800 BC
Iron Age Central Europe
Hallstatt
Ha C	800–620 BC
Ha D	620–450 BC
La Tène
LT A	450–380 BC
LT B	380–250 BC
LT C	250–150 BC
LT D	150–1 BC
Roman period
B	AD 1–150
C	AD 150–375

In Central Europe, the Iron Age is generally divided in the early Iron Age Hallstatt culture (HaC and D, 800–450 BC) and the late Iron Age La Tène culture (beginning in 450 BC). The transition from bronze to iron in Central Europe is exemplified in the great cemetery of Hallstatt, discovered near Gmunden in 1846, where the forms of the implements and weapons of the later part of the Bronze Age are imitated in iron. In the Swiss or La Tène group of implements and weapons, the forms are new and the transition complete.

The Celtic culture, or rather Proto-Celtic groups, had expanded to much of Central Europe (Gauls), and, following the Gallic invasion of the Balkans in 279 BC, as far east as central Anatolia (Galatians). In Central Europe, the prehistoric Iron Age ends with the Roman conquest.

From the Hallstatt culture, the Iron Age spreads westwards with the Celtic expansion from the 6th century BC. In Poland, the Iron Age reaches the late Lusatian culture in about the 6th century, followed in some areas by the Pomeranian culture.

The ethnic ascription of many Iron Age cultures has been bitterly contested, as the roots of Germanic, Baltic and Slavic peoples were sought in this area.

== Italy ==
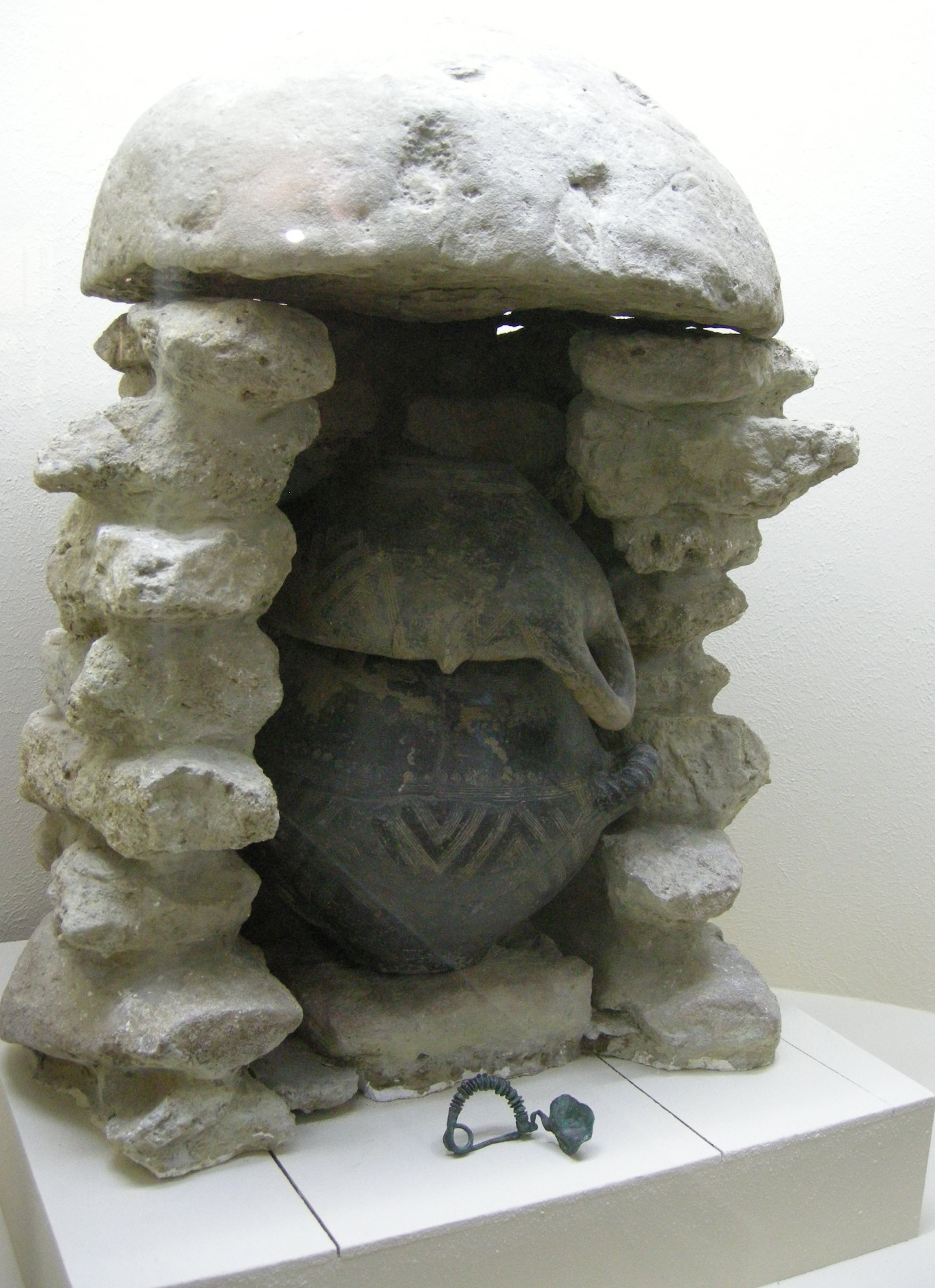
Villanovan Tomb from the 9th century BC. Museo Guarnacci, Volterra

The name of this Iron Age civilization derives from a locality in the frazione Villanova of Castenaso, Città metropolitana di Bologna, in Emilia, where a necropolis was discovered by Giovanni Gozzadini in 1853–1856. It succeeded the Proto-Villanovan culture during the Iron Age in the territory of Tuscany and northern Lazio and spread in parts of Romagna, Campania and Fermo in the Marche. The main characteristic of the Villanovans (with some similarities with the Proto-Villanovan period of the late Bronze Age) were cremation burials, in which the deceased's ashes were housed in bi-conical urns and buried. The burial characteristics relate the Villanovan culture to the Central European Urnfield culture (c. 1300–750 BCE) and the successive Hallstatt culture. The Villanovans were initially devoted to agriculture and animal husbandry, with a simplified social order. Later, specialized craftsmanship activities such as metallurgy and ceramics caused the accumulation of wealth, which resembled the appearance of social stratification.

The Latial culture ranged approximately over ancient Old Latium. The Iron Age Latial culture coincided with the arrival in the region of a people who spoke Old Latin. The culture was likely therefore to identify a phase of the socio-political self-consciousness of the Latin tribe, during the period of the kings of Alba Longa and the foundation of the Roman Kingdom.

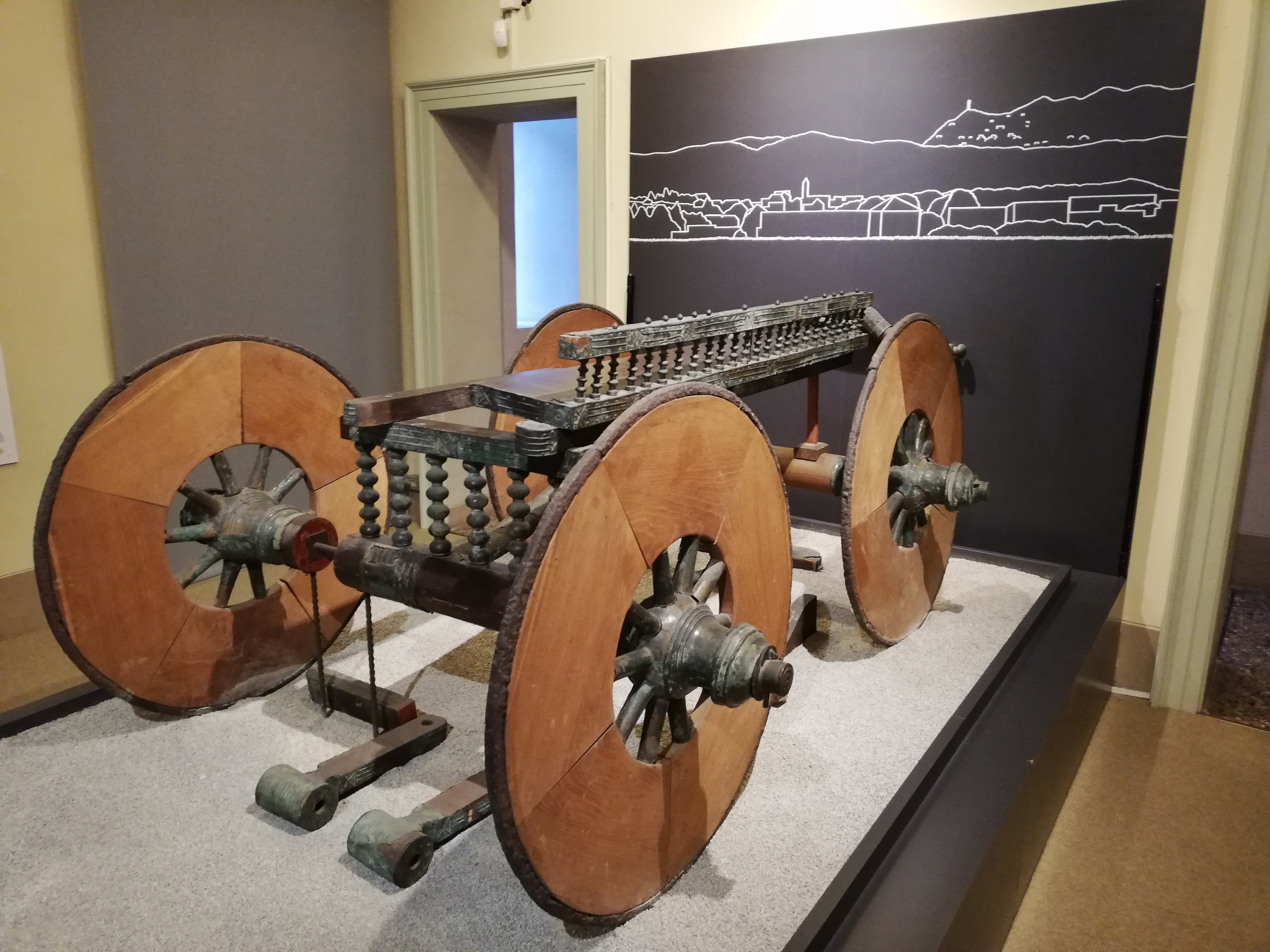
Funerary wagon, Golasecca culture

The Este culture or Atestine culture was an Iron Age archaeological culture existing from the late Italian Bronze Age (10th-9th century BCE, proto-Venetic phase) to the Roman period (1st century BCE). It was located in the present territory of Veneto in Italy and derived from the earlier and more extensive Proto-Villanovan culture. It is also called "civilization of situlas", or paleo-Venetic.

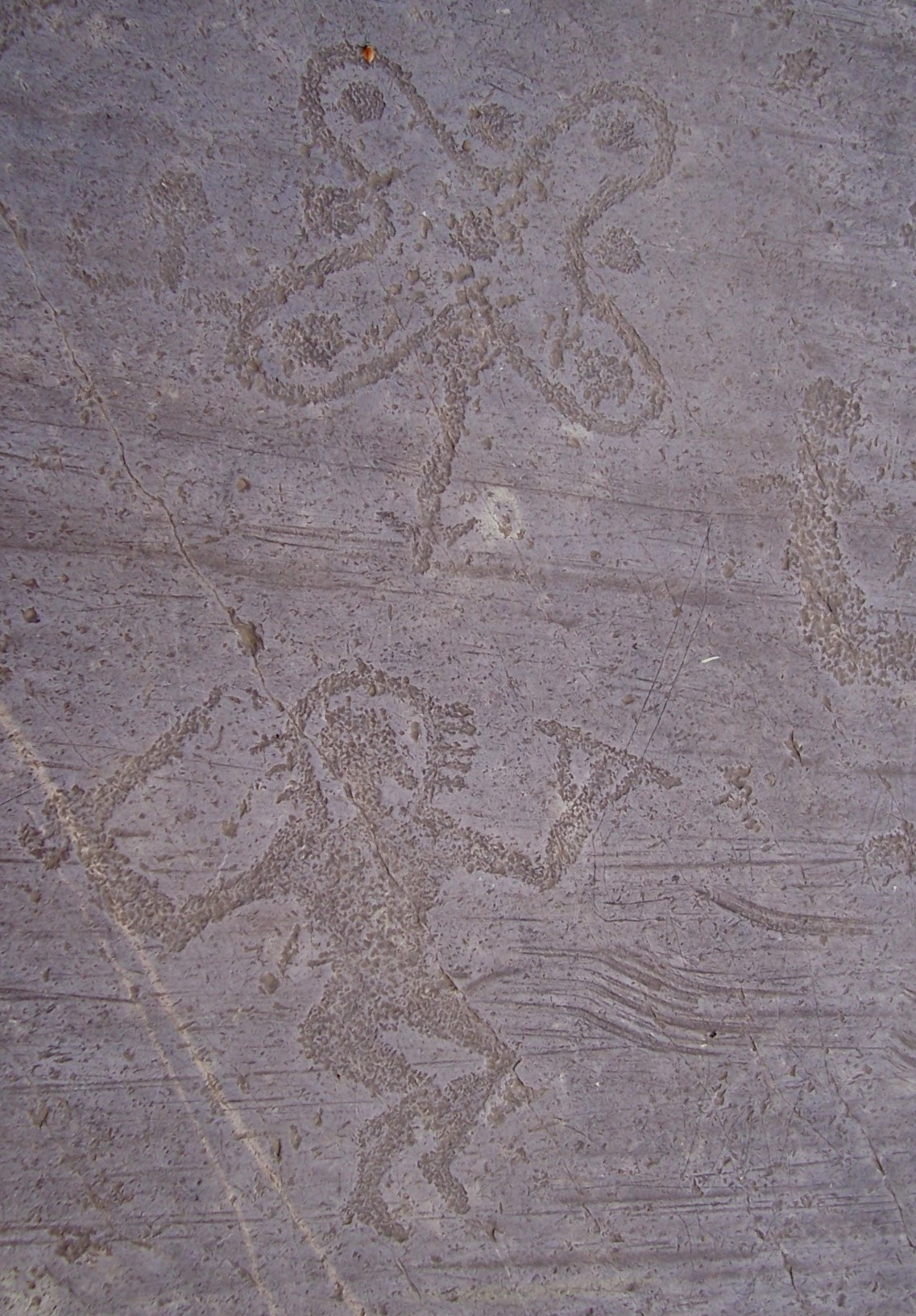
Rock drawings in Val Camonica.

The Golasecca culture emerged during the early Iron Age in the northwestern Po plain. It takes its name from Golasecca, a locality next to the Ticino where, in the early 19th century, abbot Giovanni Battista Giani excavated its first findings (some fifty tombs with ceramics and metal objects). Remains of the Golasecca culture span an area of roughly 20,000 square kilometers south of the Alps and between the Po, Sesia and Serio rivers, dating from the ninth to the fourth century BCE. Their origins can be directly traced from that of Canegrate and to the so-called Proto-Golasecca culture (12th–10th centuries BC). The Golasecca culture traded with the Etruscans and the Hallstatt culture on the north, later reaching the Greek world (oil, wine, bronze objects, ceramics and others) and northern Europe (tin and amber from the Baltic coast). In a Golasecca culture tomb in Pombia, researchers found the oldest known remains of common hop beer in the world.

The Fritzens-Sanzeno culture is attested in the late Iron Age, from the sixth to the first century BC, in the Alpine region of Trentino and South Tyrol; in the period of maximum expansion it reached into the Engadin region.

The Camuni were an ancient people of uncertain origin (according to Pliny the Elder, they were Euganei; according to Strabo, they were Rhaetians) who lived in Val Camonica – in what is now northern Lombardy – during the Iron Age, although human groups of hunters, shepherds and farmers are known to have lived in the area since the Neolithic. They reached the height of their power during the Iron Age due to the presence of numerous iron mills in Val Camonica. Their historical importance is, however, mostly due to their legacy of carved rocks, c. 300,000 in number, which date from the Palaeolithic to the Middle Ages.

Incineration and inhumation in Iron Age Italy

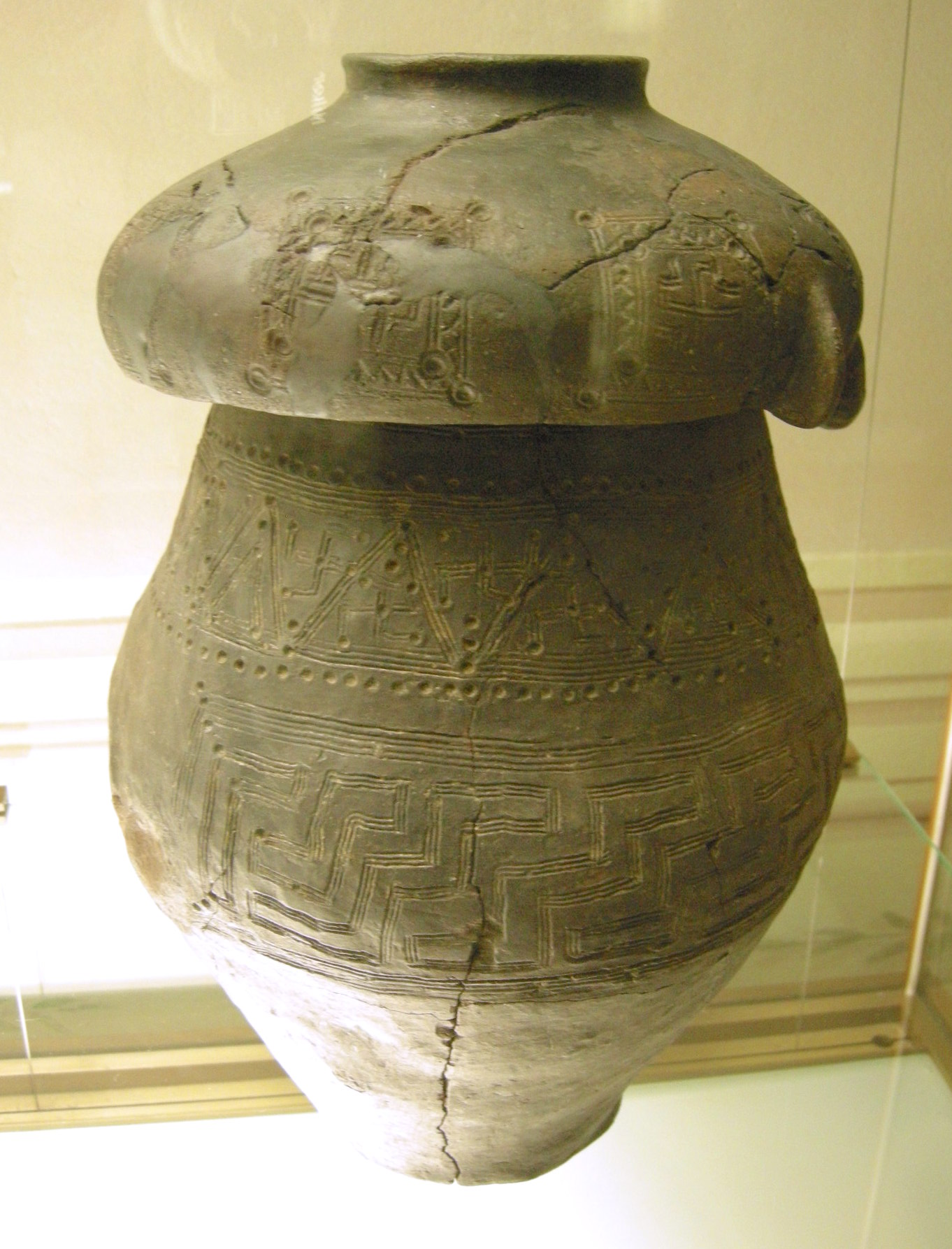
Villanovan double urn.

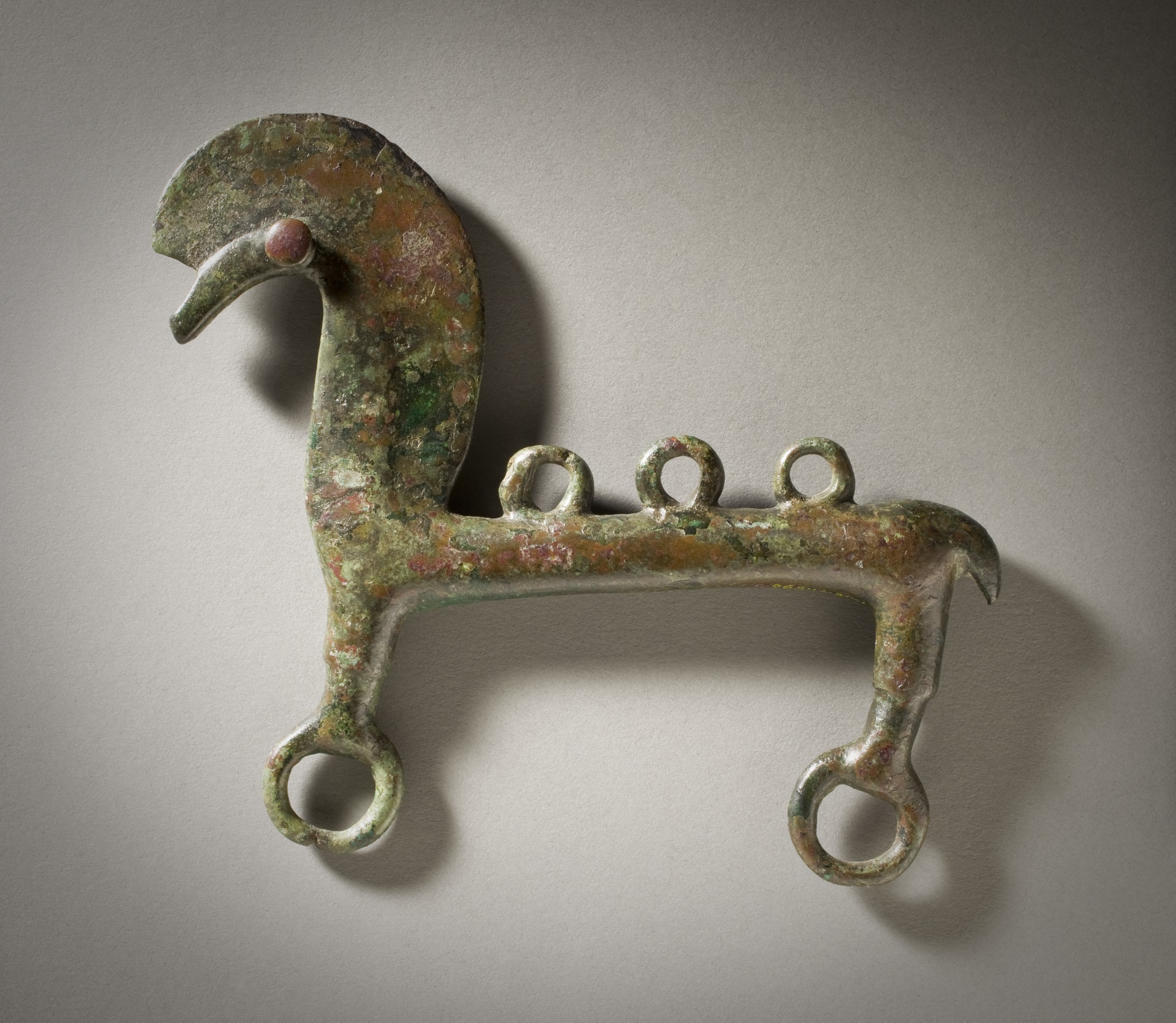
Bronze Harness Trapping in the Shape of a Horse; Villanovan, 9th–8th century BC. LACMA.

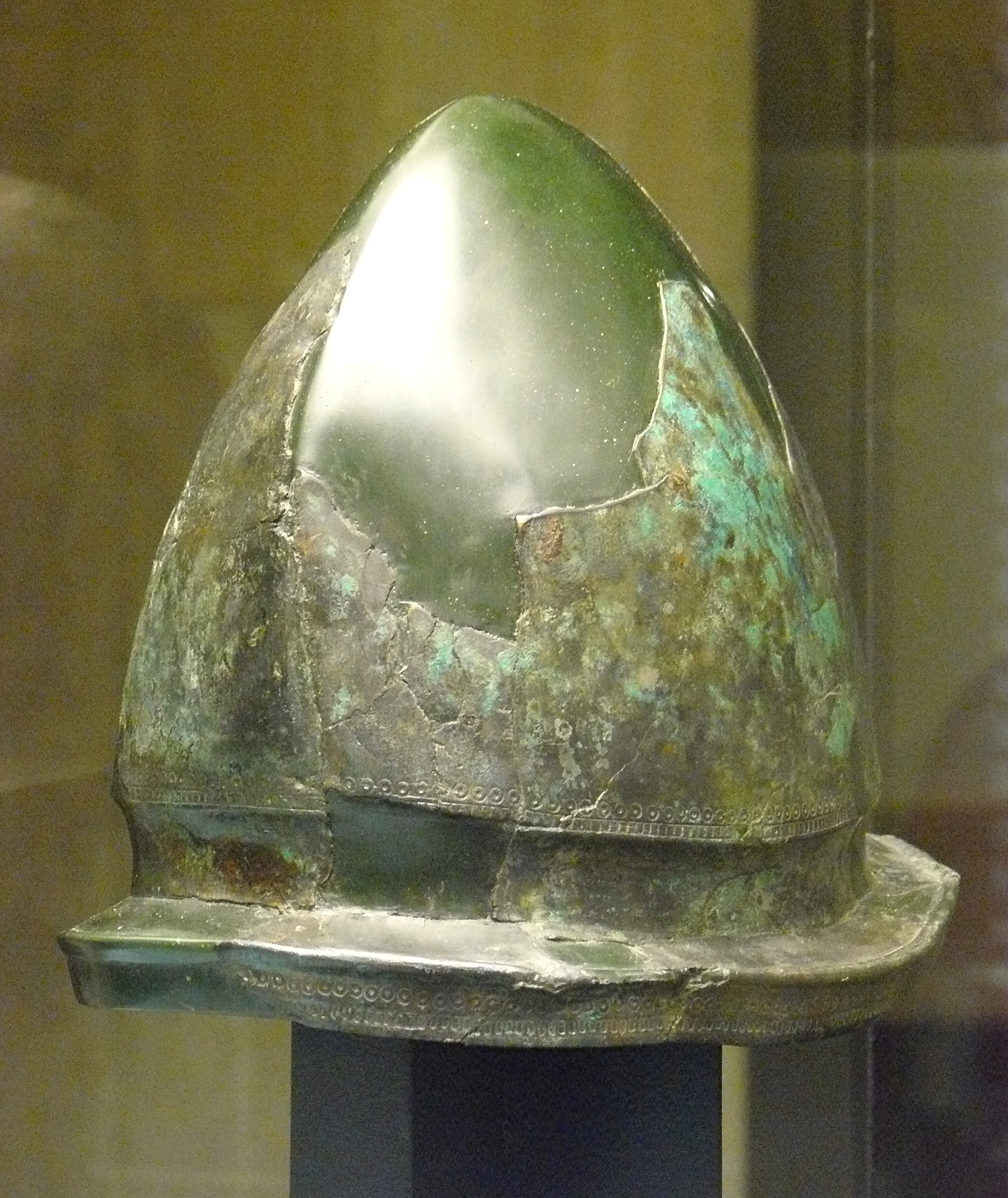
Negau type helmet from the Golasecca III period (480/450 BC).

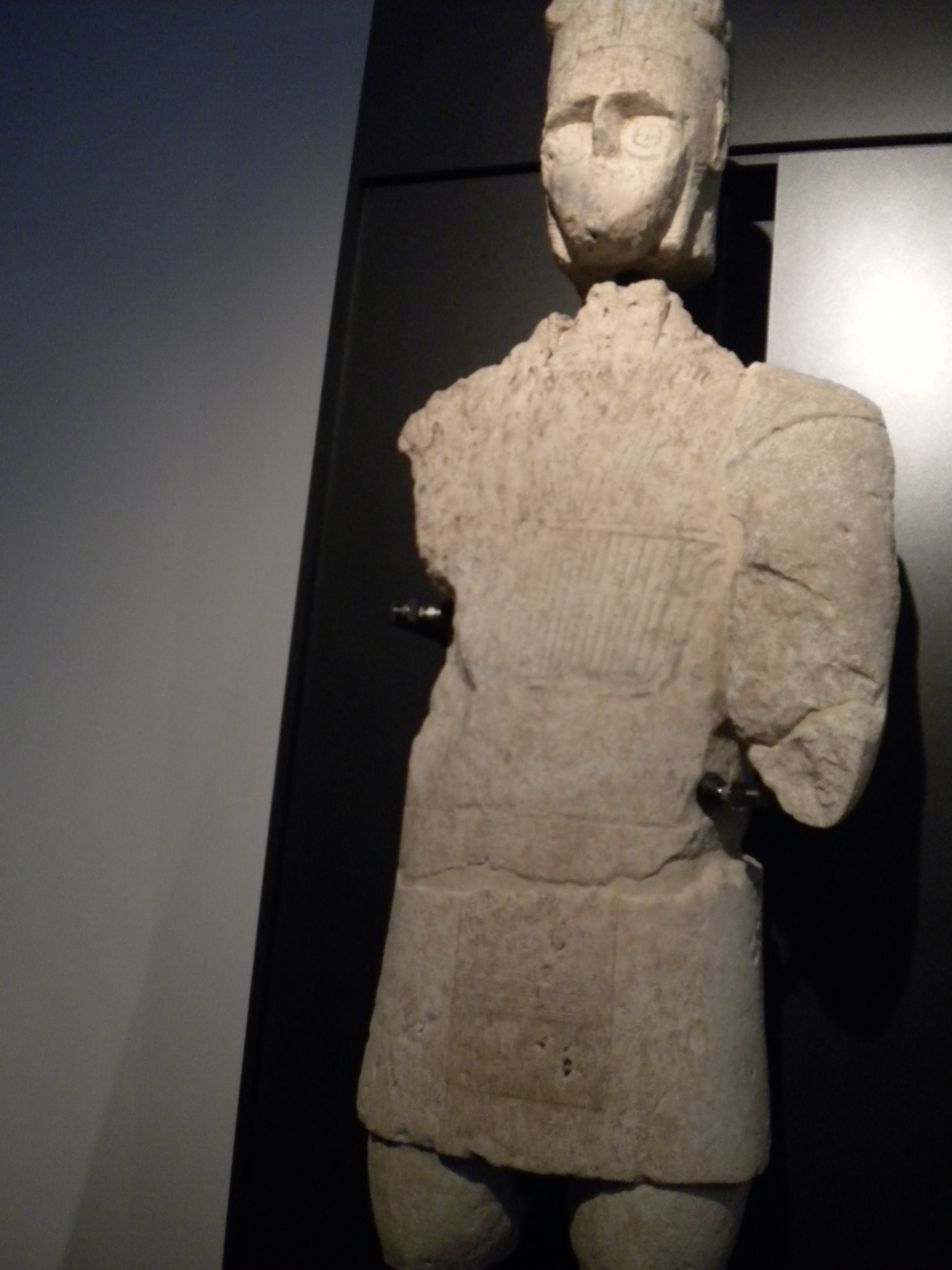
Nuragic statue of a warrior from Monte Prama, 10th–8th century bc

== Western Europe ==
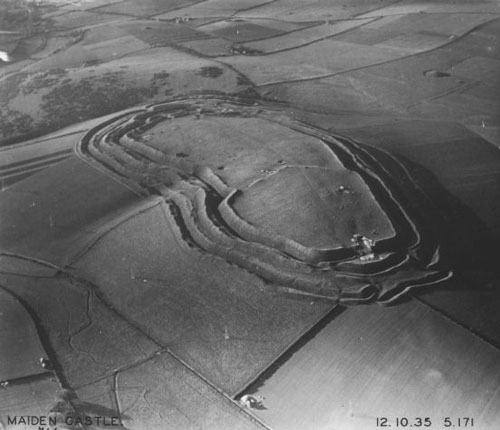
Hillforts spread across Europe in the Iron Age; Maiden Castle in England is one of the largest. Photograph taken in 1935 by Major George Allen (1891–1940).

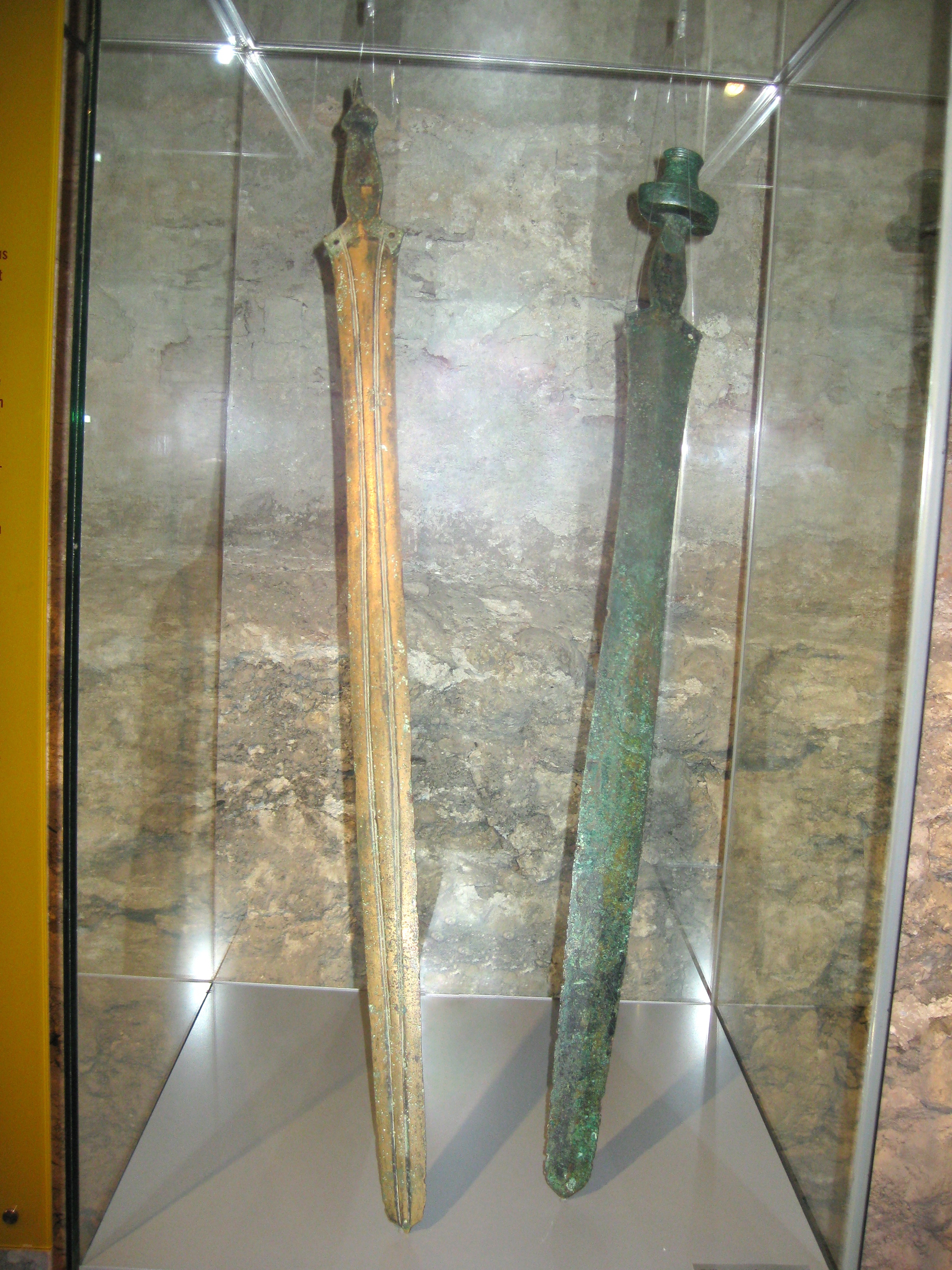
Hallstatt 'C' swords; generally iron swords are longer than bronze ones.

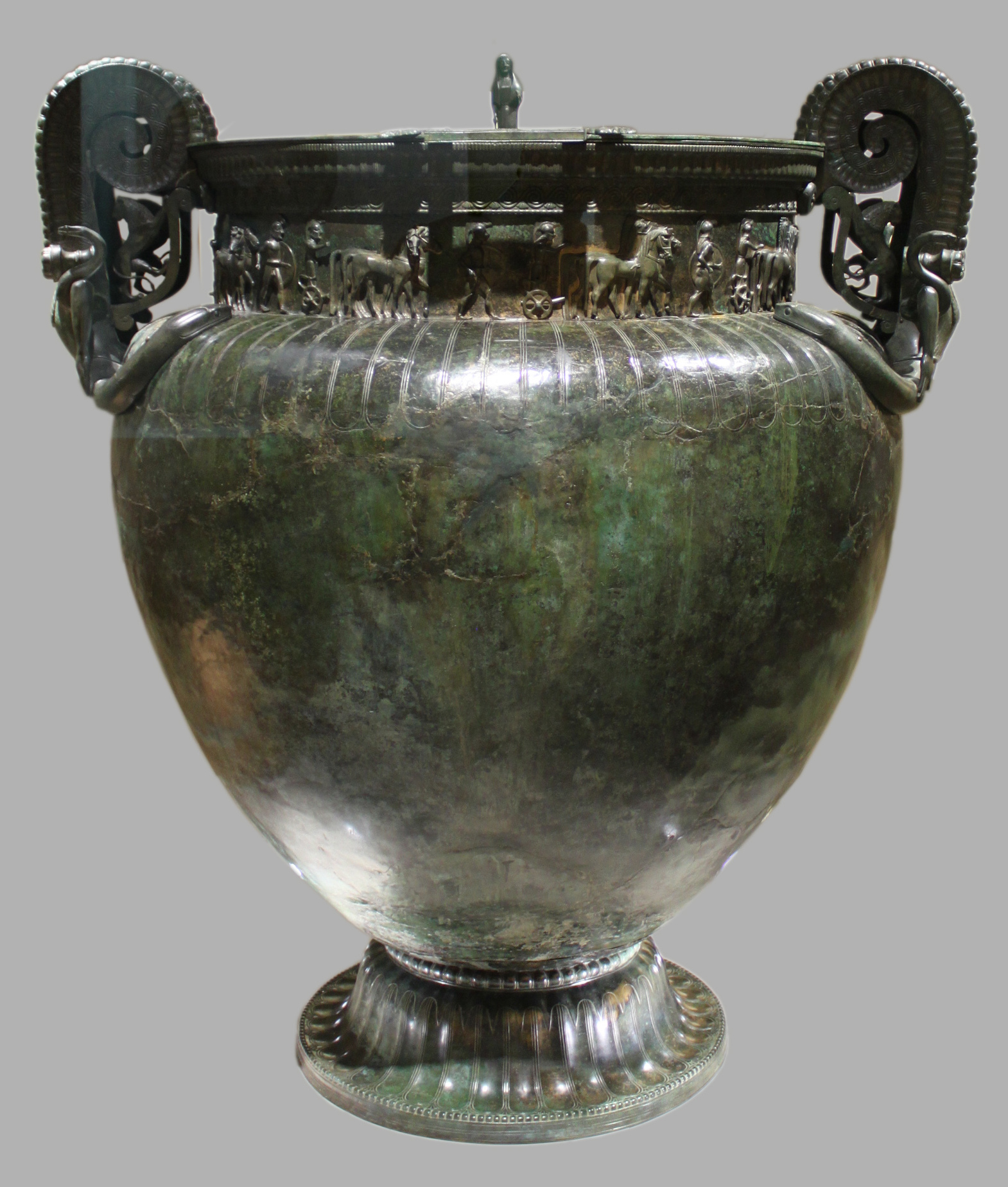
Greek krater imported to southern France around 500 BC

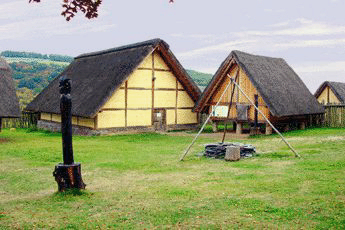
German La Tène settlement reconstructed

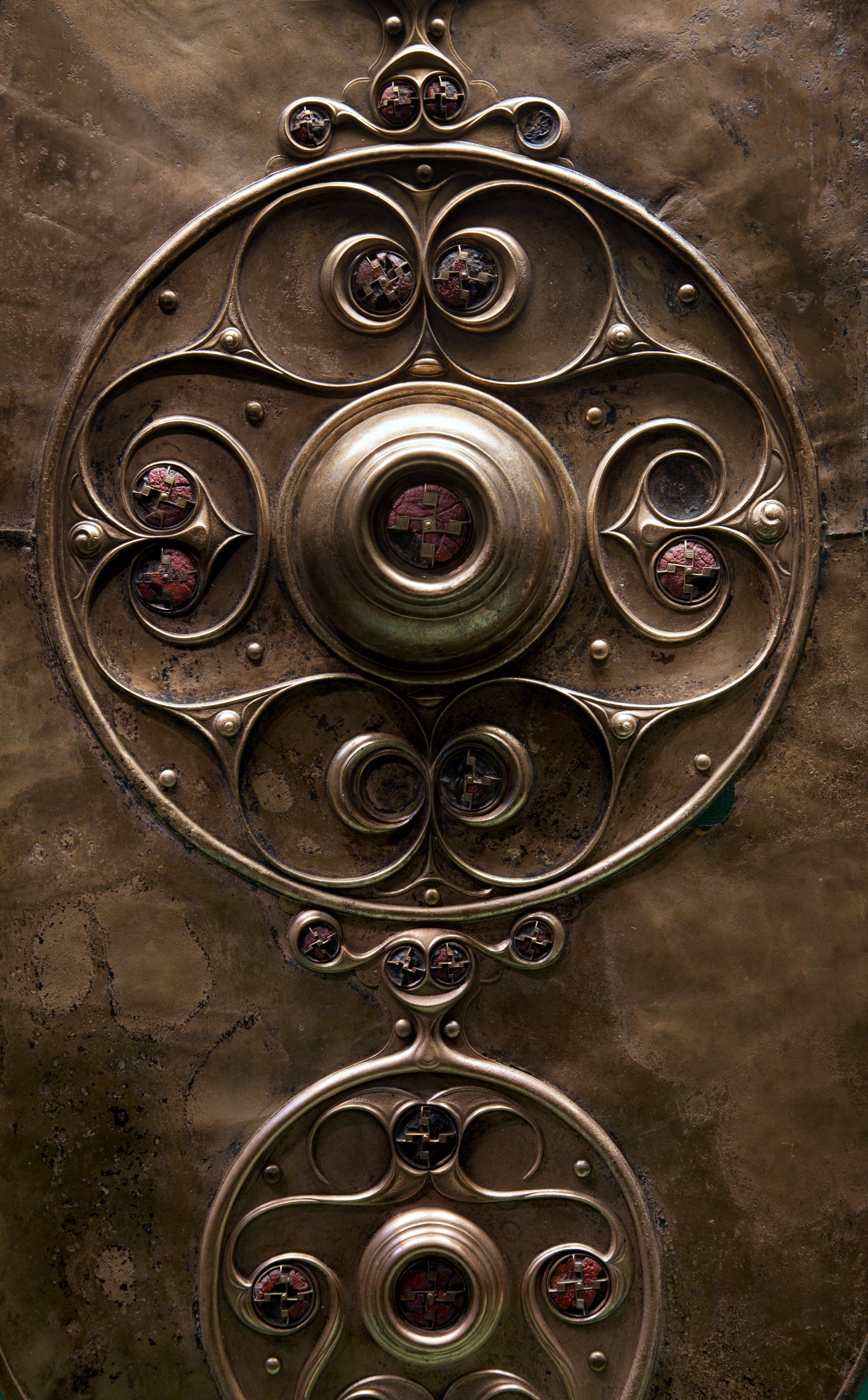
Detail of the Battersea Shield from London

The 'Celtic' culture had expanded to the group of islands of northwest Europe (Insular Celts) and Iberia (Celtiberians, Celtici and Gallaeci). In the British Isles, the British Iron Age lasted from about 800 BC until the Roman Conquest and until the 5th century in non-Romanized areas. Structures dating from this time are often impressive, for example, the brochs and duns of northern Scotland and the hillforts that dotted the islands. On the Iberian Peninsula, the Paleohispanic scripts began to be used between 7th century to the 5th century BC. These scripts were used until the end of the 1st century BC or the beginning of the 1st century AD.

In 2017, a Celtic warrior's grave, dated to about BC 320 to 174, was discovered at a housing development under construction in Pocklington at the Yorkshire Wolds. During a very long excavation project, the site was found to include a bronze shield, remains of a chariot and the skeletons of ponies. The shield's boss bears a resemblance to the Wandsworth shield boss (circa BC 350 to 150), owned by the British Museum. One design element on the extremely well-preserved Pocklington shield, a scalloped border, "is not comparable to any other Iron Age finds across Europe, adding to its valuable uniqueness", said Paula Ware, managing director at MAP Archaeological Practice Ltd in late 2019. Horses were rarely included in Iron Age burials, making the find particularly significant. "The discoveries are set to widen our understanding of the Arras culture (Middle Iron Age) and the dating of artefacts to secure contexts is exceptional," according to Paula Ware.

Further recent excavations at nearby Thornton (c.17km from Arras Farm and c.6km from Pocklington) have revealed iron smelting to be firmly established during the Middle Iron Age in the area and so is likely linked to the Arras culture. The majority of grave goods are actually made of iron. The large-scale, communal nature of the smelting at Thornton suggests it supported the significant demand for iron tools and funerary goods required by these communities.

== Northern Europe ==
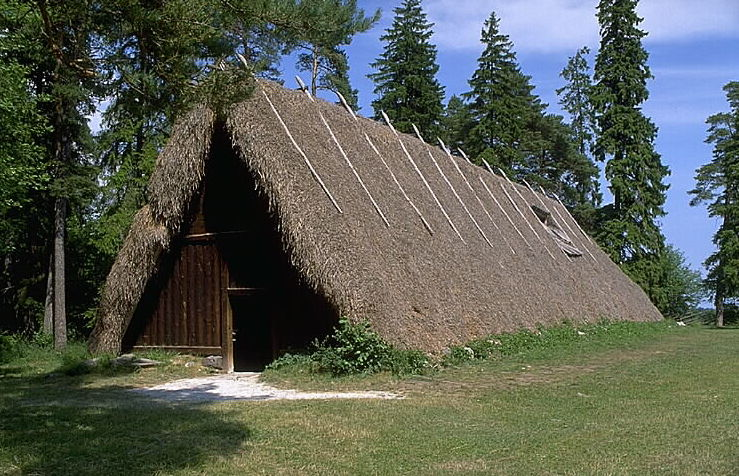
Lojsta Hall, a 30 x 16 m reconstructed hall from the Germanic Iron Age (Gotland, Sweden)

The early Iron Age forms of Scandinavia show no traces of Roman influence, though such influences become abundant toward the middle of the period. The duration of the Iron Age is variously estimated according to how its commencement is placed nearer to or farther from the opening years of the Christian era, but it is generally agreed that the last division of the Iron Age of Scandinavia, the Viking Period, is considered to be from 700 to 1000 AD, when paganism in those lands was superseded by Christianity.

The Iron Age north of about the Rhine, beyond the Celts and then the Romans, is divided into two eras: the Pre-Roman Iron Age and the Roman Iron Age. In Scandinavia, further periods followed up to 1100: the Migration Period, the Vendel Period and the Viking Age. The earliest part of the Iron Age in northwestern Germany and southern Jutland was dominated by the Jastorf culture.

Early Scandinavian iron production typically involved the harvesting of bog iron. The Scandinavian peninsula, Finland and Estonia show sophisticated iron production from c. 500 BC. Metalworking and Ananyino culture pottery co-occur to some extent. Another iron ore used was ironsand (such as red soil). Its high phosphorus content can be identified in slag. Such slag is sometimes found together with asbestos-ceramic-associated axe types belonging to the Ananyino culture.

In the early Iron Age, people were usually buried in huge urnfields with hundreds or thousands of urns. However, a recent study by researchers at Kiel University has shown that the first urnfields were built as early as the 7th century BC, in the very late Bronze Age.

== Transition to stationary agriculture due to the iron plough ==
In Southern Europe, forests consisted of open evergreen and pine forests. After the use of slash and burn techniques, these forests had less capacity for regrowth than the forests north of the Alps.

In Northern Europe, there was usually only one crop harvested before grass growth took over, while in the south, suitable fall was used for several years and the soil was quickly exhausted. Slash and burn shifting cultivation, therefore, ceased much earlier in the south than the north. Most of the forests in the Mediterranean had disappeared by classical times. The classical authors wrote about the great forests (Semple 1931 261–296).

Homer writes of wooded Samothrace, Zakynthos, Sicily and other wooded land. The authors give us the general impression that the Mediterranean countries had more forest than now, but that it had already lost much forest, and that it was left there in the mountains (Darby 1956 186).

It is clear that Europe remained wooded, and not only in the north. However, during the late Roman Iron Age and early Viking Age, forest areas drastically reduced in Northern Europe, and settlements were regularly moved. There is no good explanation for this mobility, and the transition to stable settlements from the late Viking period, as well as the transition from shifting cultivation to stationary use of arable land. At the same time plows appears as a new group of implements were found both in graves and in depots. It can be confirmed that early agricultural people preferred forest of good quality in the hillside with good drainage, and traces of cattle quarters are evident here.

The Greek explorer and merchant Pytheas of Massalia made a voyage to Northern Europe c. 330 BC. Part of his itinerary has survived to this day thanks to the accounts by Polybius, Strabo and Pliny. Pytheas had visited Thule, which lay a six-day voyage north of Britain. There "the barbarians showed us the place where the sun does not go to sleep. It happened because there the night was very short -- in some places two, in others three hours -- so that the sun shortly after its fall soon went up again." He says that Thule was a fertile land, "rich in fruits that were ripe only until late in the year, and the people there used to prepare a drink of honey. And they threshed the grain in large houses, because of the cloudy weather and frequent rain. In the spring they drove the cattle up into the mountain pastures and stayed there all summer." This description may fit well with Norwegian coast. Here is an instance of both dairy farming and drying/threshing in a building.

In Italy, shifting cultivation was already a thing of the past at the birth of Christ. Tacitus describes it as the strange cultivation methods he had experienced among the Germans, whom he knew well from his stay with them. Rome was entirely dependent on shifting cultivation by the barbarians to survive and maintain its "Pax Romana", but when the supply from the colonies "trans alpina" began to wear out, the Roman Empire collapsed.

Tacitus writes in AD 98 about the Germans: fields are proportionate to the participating growers, but they share their crops with each other by reputation. Distribution is easy because there is great access to land. They change soil every year, and mark some off to spare, for they seek not a strenuous job in reaping from this fertile and vast land even greater yields—such as by planting apple orchards, or by fencing off fields; or by watering gardens; grain is the only thing they insist that the ground will provide. Tacitus discusses the shifting cultivation.

The Migration Period in Europe after the Roman Empire and immediately before the Viking Age suggests that it was still more profitable for the peoples of Central Europe to move on to new forests after the best parcels were exhausted than to wait for the new forest to grow up. Therefore, the peoples of the temperate zone in Europe slash and burners, remained for as long as the forests permitted. This exploitation of forests explains this rapid and elaborate move. But the forest could not tolerate this in the long run; it first ended in the Mediterranean. The forest here did not have the same vitality as the powerful coniferous forest in Central Europe. Deforestation was partly caused by burning for pasture fields. Missing timber delivery led to higher prices and more stone constructions in the Roman Empire (Stewart 1956 123).

The forest also decreased gradually northwards in Europe, but in the Nordic countries it has survived. The clans in pre-Roman Italy seemed to be living in temporary locations rather than established cities. They cultivated small patches of land, guarded their sheep and their cattle, traded with foreign merchants, and at times fought with one another: etruscans, umbriere, ligurianere, sabinere, Latinos, campaniere, apulianere, faliscanere, and samniter, just to mention a few. These Italic ethnic groups developed identities as settlers and warriors c. 900 BC. They built forts in the mountains, today a subject of much investigation. The forest has hidden them for a long time, but eventually, they will provide information about the people who built and used these buildings. The ruin of a large samnittisk temple and theater at Pietrabbondante is under investigation. These cultural relics have slumbered in the shadow of the glorious history of the Roman Empire.

Many of the Italic tribes realized the benefits of allying with the powerful Romans. When Rome built the Via Amerina 241 BC, the Faliscan people established themselves in cities on the plains, and they collaborated with the Romans on road construction. The Roman Senate gradually gained representatives from many Faliscan and Etruscan families. The Italic tribes are now settled farmers. (Zwingle, National Geographic, January 2005).

An edition of Commentarii de Bello Gallico from the AD 800. Julius Caesar wrote about Svebians, "Commentarii de Bello Gallico, "book 4.1; they are not by private and secluded fields, "privati ac separati agri apud eos nihil est", they cannot stay more than one year in a place for cultivation's sake, "Neque longius anno remanere uno in loco colendi causa licet ". The Svebes lived between the Rhine and the Elbe. About the Germans, he wrote: No one has a particular field or area for themselves, for the magistrates and chiefs give fields every year to the people and the clans, which have gathered so much ground in such places that it seems good for them to continue on to somewhere else after a year. "Neque quisquam agri modum certum aut fines habet proprios, sed magistratus ac principes in annos singulos gentibus cognationibusque hominum, qui tum una coierunt, a quantum et quo loco visum est agri attribuunt atque anno post alio transire cogunt" book 6, 22.

Strabo (63 BC – about AD 20) also writes about sveberne in Geographicon VII, 1, 3. Common to all the people in this area is that they can easily change residence because of their sordid way of life; that they do not grow any fields and do not collect property, but live in temporary huts. They get their nourishment from their livestock for the most part, and like nomads, they pack all their goods in wagons and go on to wherever they want. Horazius writes in 17 BC (Carmen säculare, 3, 24, 9 ff .) about the people of Macedonia. The proud Getae also live happily, growing free food and cereal for themselves on land that they do not want to cultivate for more than a year, "vivunt et rigidi Getae, immetata quibus iugera liberal fruges et Cererem freunt, nec cultura placet longior annua." Several classical writers have descriptions of shifting cultivation people. Many peoples' various shifting cultivations characterized the migration Period in Europe. The exploitation of forests demanded constant displacement, and large areas were deforested.

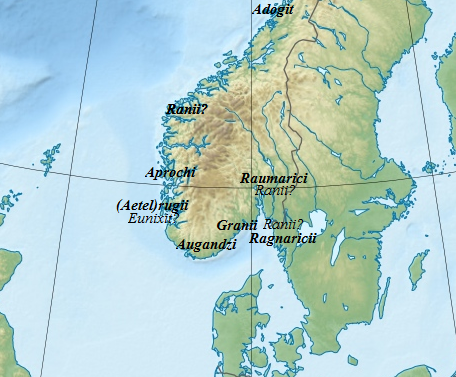
Locations of the tribes described by Jordanes in Norway, contemporary with, and some possibly ruled by Rodulf.

Jordanes was a monk in Italy of Gothic descent. In his work De origine actibusque Getarum (The Origin and Deeds of the Getae/Goths), the author Procopius provides information on the big island Scandza, which the Goths come from. He expects that of the tribes who live here, some are adogit living far north with 40 days of the midnight sun. After adogit come screrefennae and suehans who also live in the north. Screrefennae moved a lot and did not bring to the field crops, but made their living by hunting and collecting bird eggs. Suehans was a seminomadic tribe that had good horses like Thüringians and ran fur hunting to sell the skins. It was too far north to grow grain. Prokopios, ca. AD 550, also describes a primitive hunter people he calls skrithifinoi. These pitiful creatures had neither wine nor corn, for they did not grow any crops. "Both men and women engaged incessantly just in hunting the rich forests and mountains, which gave them an endless supply of game and wild animals." Screrefennae and skrithifinoi is well Sami who often have names such as; skridfinner, which is probably a later form, derived from skrithibinoi or some similar spelling. The two old terms, screrefennae and skrithifinoi, are probably origins in the sense of neither ski nor finn. Furthermore, in Jordanes' ethnographic description of Scandza are several tribes, and among these are finnaithae "who was always ready for battle" Mixi evagre and otingis that should have lived like wild beasts in mountain caves, "further from them" lived osthrogoth, raumariciae, ragnaricii, finnie, vinoviloth and suetidi that would last prouder than other people.

Adam of Bremen described Sweden, according to information he received from the Danish king Sweyn II of Denmark, in 1068 as "very fruitful, the earth holds many crops and honey, it has a greater livestock than all other countries, there are a lot of useful rivers and forests, with regard to women they do not know moderation, they have for their economic position two, three, or more wives simultaneously, the rich and the rulers are innumerable". This perhaps indicates that there was a form of extended family structure present in Sweden at the time.

== See also ==
- Prehistoric Europe
- Bronze Age Europe
- Hallstatt culture
- La Tène culture
- Pre-Roman Iron Age
- Roman Iron Age
- Roman imperial period (chronology)
- British Iron Age
