= Aristotelia pancaliella =

Scientific classification
- Kingdom: Animalia
- Phylum: Arthropoda
- Clade: Pancrustacea
- Class: Insecta
- Order: Lepidoptera
- Family: Gelechiidae
- Genus: Aristotelia
- Species: A. pancaliella

Binomial name
- Aristotelia pancaliella (Staudinger, 1871)

Synonyms
- Gelechia pancaliella Staudinger, 1871

Species of moth

Aristotelia pancaliella is a moth of the family Gelechiidae. It is found in Southern Russia, Syria, and Turkey.

The wingspan is about 10 mm. The forewings are olive-brown.
