= History of Tatarstan =

The territory of Tatarstan, a republic of the Russian Federation, was inhabited by different groups during the prehistoric period. The state of Volga Bulgaria grew during the Middle Ages and for a time was subject to the Khazars. The Volga Bulgars became Muslim and incorporated various Turkic peoples to form the modern Volga Tatar ethnic group.

The region came under the domination of the Khanate of Kazan in the 15th century. The khanate was conquered by Ivan the Terrible in 1552 and abolished in 1708. This period was marked by settlement of the area by Russians and attempts at conversion to Orthodox Christianity, provoking a number of rebellions among the Tatars and neighbouring groups. In the late 18th and 19th centuries industry developed, economic conditions improved and Tatars achieved more equal status with Russians. However, Tatar national consciousness was growing, and upon the October Revolution of 1917, national institutions were established and independence declared as the Idel-Ural State. After several years of civil war the Soviet government suppressed independence and established the Tatar Autonomous Soviet Socialist Republic within the Soviet Union.

Under Soviet rule there was a famine followed by progressive decline of the Tatar language, culture and religion both Christian and Muslim. The discovery of large petroleum deposits helped to promote further major growth in industry. Around the time of the fall of the USSR in 1991 there were again moves for independence, but in 1994 the region, under the name of Tatarstan, became a constituent republic of the Russian Federation. In 2008 a national assembly, the Milli Mejlis, declared Tatarstan independent, but this status has not been recognised by the United Nations or the Russian government.

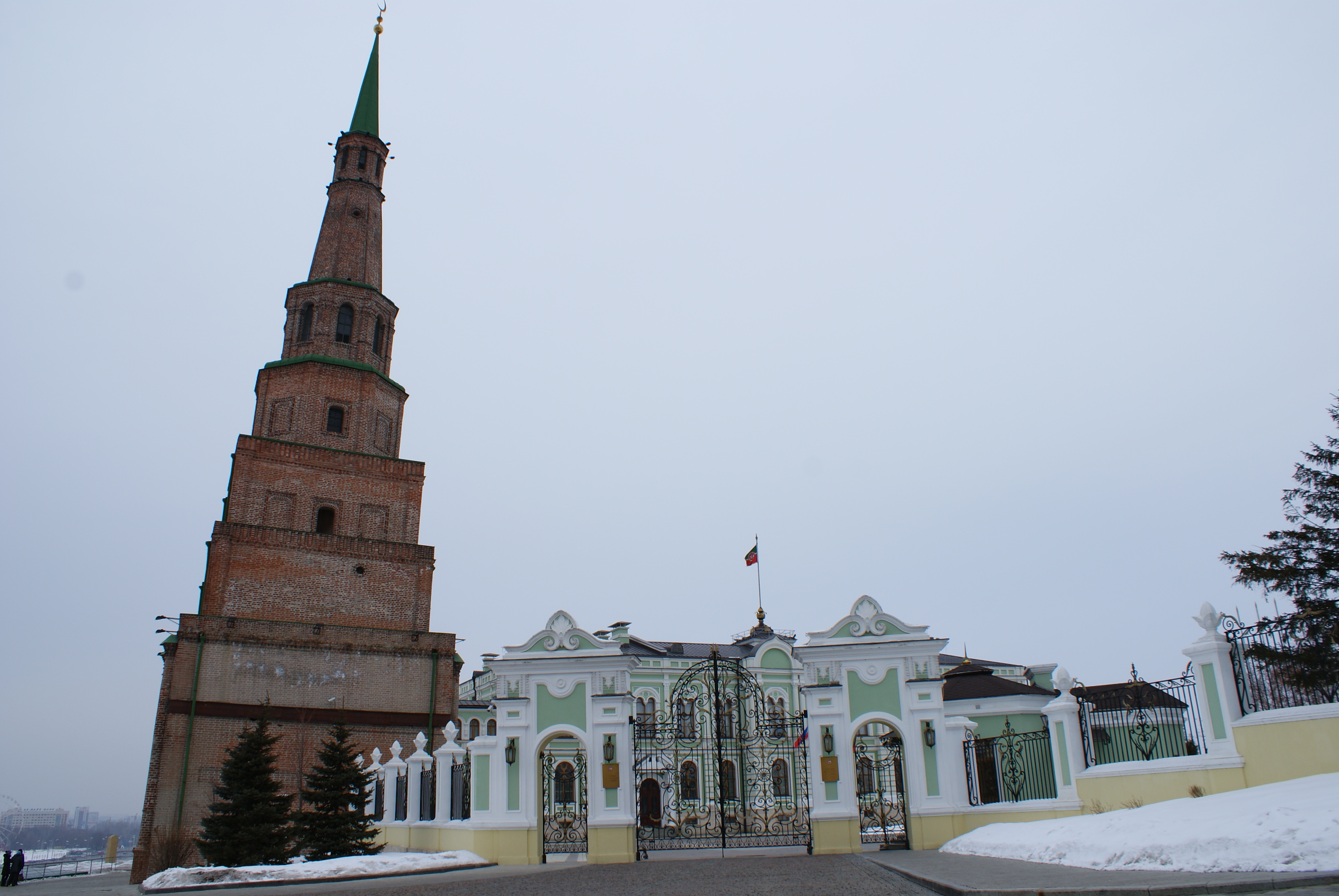
Tatarstan President's headquarter and Tower of Suyumbike - panoramio

== Pre-history ==
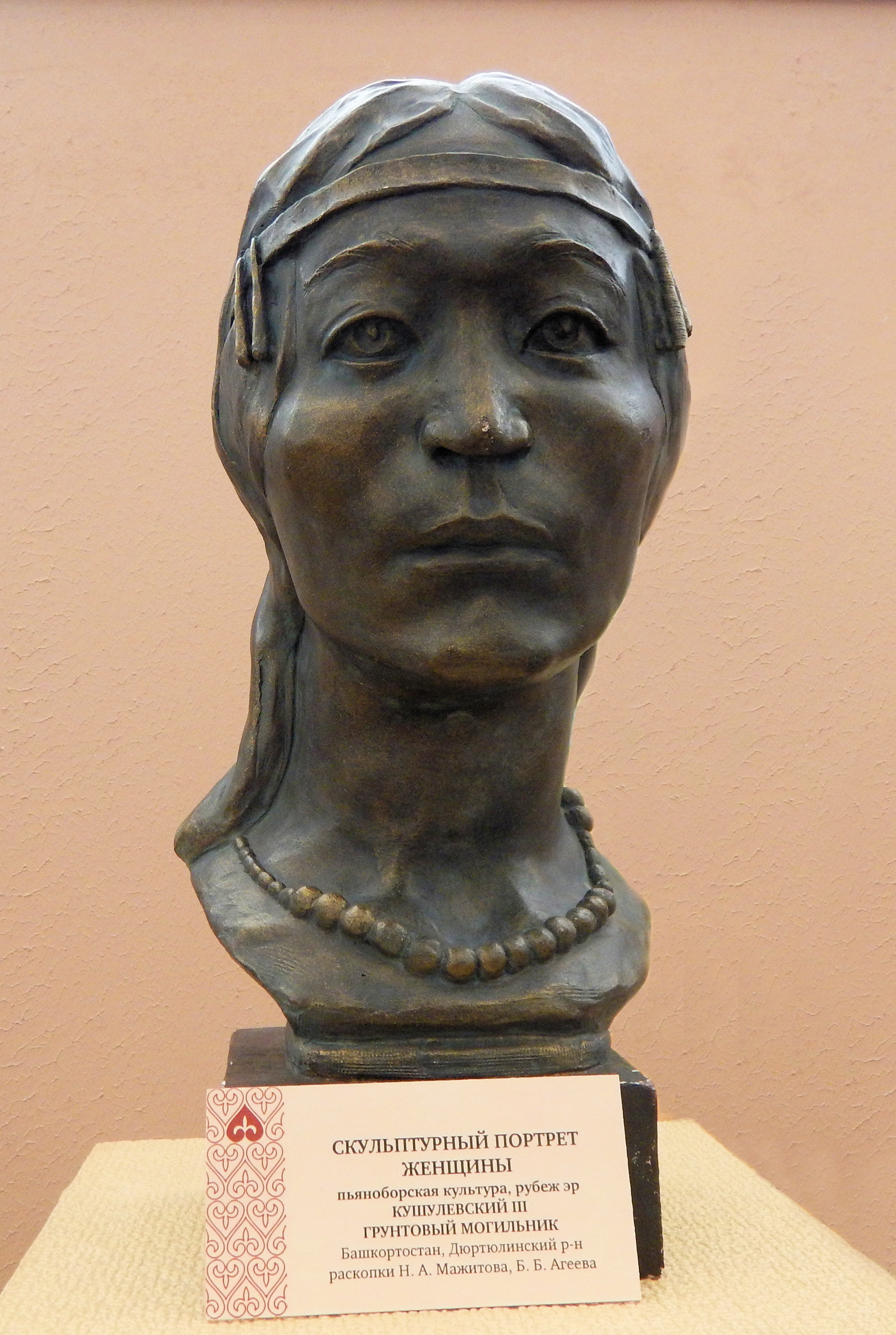
Forensic reconstruction of a Pyanobor culture woman (turn of the era), Kushulevsky burial ground.

Human habitation in Tatarstan dates back to the Palaeolithic period. Remains of several cultures of the Stone and Bronze Ages have been discovered within Tatarstan.

During the Iron Age (8th century BCE – 3rd century CE), the Ananyino culture, probably a Finno-Ugrian-speaking people, dominated the area of the upper Volga and Kama river valleys. From the middle of the 1st millennium BC western Tatarstan was occupied by the Gorodets culture.

From the 4th century BCE much of the Volga–Kama basin was occupied by tribes of the İmänkiskä culture, who are thought to have been related to the Scythians, speakers of one of the Indo-European languages. Around the beginning of the 1st century CE a new group, the so-called Pyanobor culture (probably of Finno-Ugric origin) appeared at the lower Kama.

During the great migrations of late antiquity Siberian Turkic and Finno-Ugric tribes settled the region east of the middle Volga and forced out the Pyanobor culture from the Kama basin. The Pyanobor tribes lingered on in what are now the north and north-western parts of Tatarstan.

== Turkic peoples ==
The period from roughly 500 to 700 CE saw an influx of Turkic-speaking nomads. These immigrants' culture was related to those of the Göktürks, Khazars and the tribes of Great Bulgaria.

== Volga Bulgaria ==
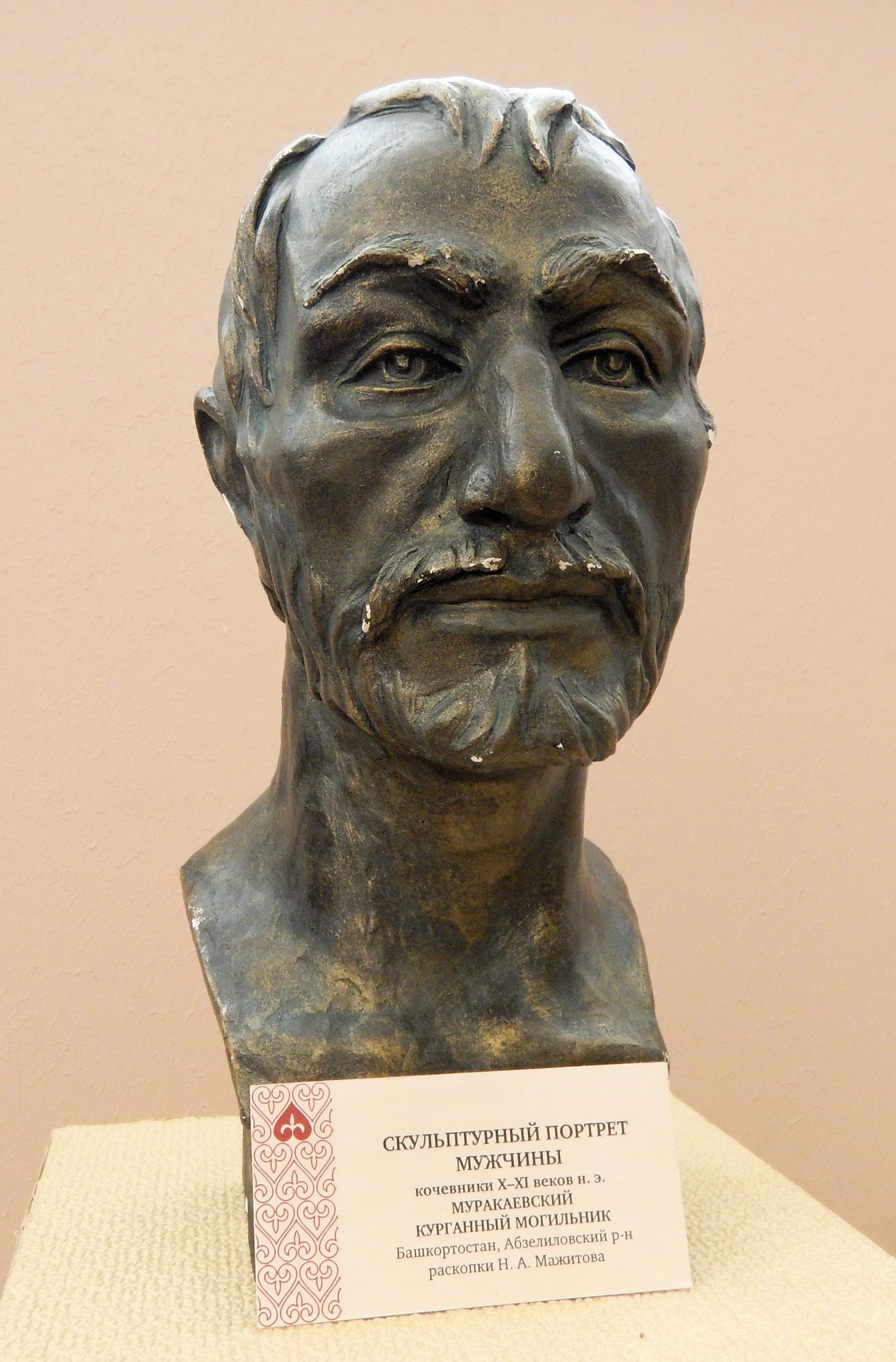
Forensic reconstruction of a nomad, 10th-11th century CE, Murakaevsky burial ground.

The 9th and 10th centuries saw the rise of the first organized state in the region, the Khanate of the Volga Bulgars. The population of Volga Bulgaria was largely agricultural. The cities of Bolghar, Bilär, and Suar, among others, appeared with the growth of industry (casting, forging) and trade. Crop-growing and a cattle-breeding played a major role in the economy. The farmers were predominantly free landowners.

In the early 10th century the Volga Bulgars converted to Islam, causing their culture to be greatly influenced by that of the Muslim Middle East.

=== Mongol invasion ===
After the conquest of Volga Bulgaria by Mongol troops under Batu Khan the country was under the control of the khans of the Golden Horde. As a result of the admixing of different Turkic peoples and languages to the Volga Bolgars during this period, the modern Volga Tatar ethnos emerged.

== Khanate of Kazan ==
In the first half of the 15th century, as the result of Golden Horde's collapse, the Khanate of Kazan emerged as the dominant power in the Volga–Kama region. As Muscovy grew in power and struggled for control of trade routes and territory with the Golden Horde's successor states, Kazan was at times dominated by factions favorable to Moscow, and at other times by factions advocating alliance with other Tatar polities such as the Crimean Khanate. Finally, the khanate was conquered by Ivan the Terrible in 1552.

== After the Russian invasion ==
After 1552 the khanate was governed by Kazan Palace's Office formed in Moscow. In 1555 a bishop was appointed in Kazan with a mandate to baptize the Idel-Ural peoples. Many churches and monasteries were built, and Russian peasants and craftsmen were resettled within Tatarstan. At the same time ethnic Tatars were removed from Kazan proper as well as regions close to rivers and roads. Under pressure from the Russians many Tatars emigrated to the Upper Kama, Trans-Kama area, Bashkortostan, the Urals and Siberia during the 16th and 17th centuries. The result was a decline in agriculture, industry and commerce throughout the region. The local population was forced to pay the yasaq tax. Some part of the Tatar nobility were included in the nobility of the Russian Empire; many underwent baptism to keep their privileges.

In 1708, the Khanate of Kazan was abolished and the province was placed under the control of a new Kazan Governorate. It included Middle Volga and Western Urals. Kazan, with 20,000 citizens, was one of major trade and handicraft centers of Russia. Manufacturing developed and in the beginning of 19th century major hide, soap and candle factories appeared. A class of Tatar merchants arose, who carried on brisk trade with Central Asia.

Restrictions in occupation, heavy taxation, and discrimination against non-Christians blocked the cultural and economic development of the Tatars. Several rebellions and peasants' wars broke out as a result. During the Time of Troubles, the Kazan khanate regained its independence with the aid of factions within the Russian army. Cangali bek, a Tatar nobleman, led another revolution in 1616. Other insurrections among the Volga Tatars included the Bolotnikov movement (1606–1607), Batırşa movement (1755–1756), and Pugachev's war (1773–1775). Other peoples of the Idel-Ural region took part in these conflicts.

In 1773, Muslims in Russia were granted greatly expanded rights. In 1784 Tatar noblemen (morzalar) had equal rights with Russian noblemen (dvoryane).

Tatar soldiers took part in all Russian wars, sometimes in national units (as was the case during the Napoleonic Wars).

After the reforms of the 1860s in Imperial Russia economic conditions in Tatarstan improved markedly. Stolypin's reforms led to accelerated economic development of the rural areas. In the 19th century a large middle class developed among the Tatars. The Russian Revolution of 1905 awakened Tatar national consciousness and led to calls for equal rights, development of a distinct national culture and national self-consciousness as well as other freedoms. The pan-Islamic Russian party Ittifaq al-Muslimin represented the growing nationalist camp within the State Duma. The first Tatar mass-media appeared during this period with the publication of Tatar language newspapers such as "Yoldız", "Waqıt", "Azat", "Azat xalıq", "İrek", "Tañ yoldızı", "Nur", "Fiker", "Ural", "Qazan möxbire", "Älğäsrelcädid", "Şura", "Añ", and "Mäktäp". The first Tatar professional theatre, the Säyyär also emerged at this time.

- Bezdna Unrest

== Revolution and Civil War ==
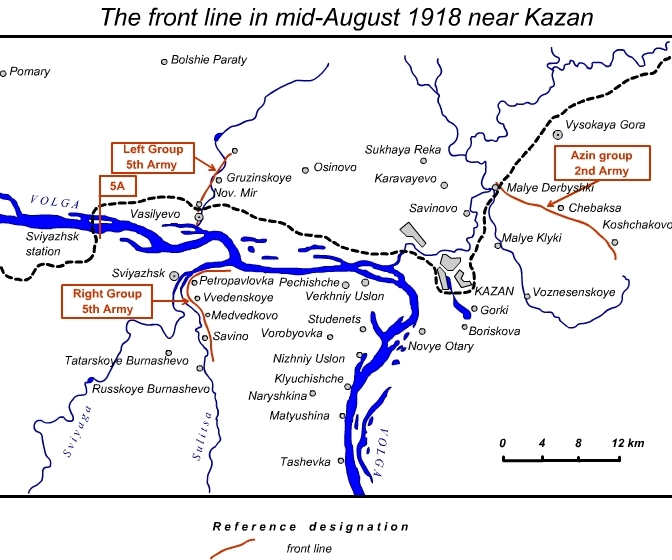
The front line in August, 1918.

During the chaos of the Russian Revolutions of 1917, Tatarstan became functionally independent with a national parliament (Millät Mäclese), national government (Milli İdärä), national council (Milli Şura), and a national military council (Xärbi Şura). Some Tatar military units took part in the Russian Civil War against the communists. Anti-communist Tatar revolutionaries declared the Idel-Ural State, but the Moscow Bolshevist government moved to prevent an independent Tatarstan on its flank. The "Muslim Council" was overthrown by a "Workers' Bolshevik Council" in a mostly Tatar-populated part of Kazan province called Bolaq artı or Zabulachye (In English, the "Transbolaqia Republic"). The Muslim Council was arrested.

In August 1918, the White Czechs and KomUch forces reached Kazan, but retreated under the Red pressure.

In 1919 the Bolsheviks declared an autonomous Tatar-Bashkir Soviet Socialist Republic, but the region was at the time largely occupied by the White Army, the leader of whom, General Kolchak, did not support an independent Muslim republic. The declaration, coupled with Kolchak's hostility, caused many Tatar and Bashkir troops to switch sides and fight for the Bolsheviks. Ultimately, the victorious Communists subsumed Tatarstan within the Russian Soviet Federative Socialist Republic (RSFSR), leading to large-scale emigration from the country, particularly among the upper class.

The Russian Civil War ended in Tatarstan with the suppression of the anti-communist peasant Pitchfork Uprising in March 1920. As a result of war communism policy the 1921-1922 Famine in Tatarstan had begun and annihilated nearly half a million people.

== Soviet rule ==
On 27 May 1920 the Tatar Autonomous Soviet Socialist Republic (TASSR) of the RSFSR was declared. However, in the late 1920s the Soviet government under Joseph Stalin began to place restrictions on the use of the Tatar language (among many other minority languages in the Soviet Union). The development of national culture declined significantly. The Tatar alphabet was switched twice (to the Latin alphabet and then to Cyrillic). From the 1930s through the 1950s, Tatar-language press, cultural institutions, theatres, national schools and institutes gradually disappeared, as education was required to be conducted in the Russian language. Industrialization, the rise of the collective farms kolektivizatsiya and persecutions such as the Great Purge contributed to this decline.

Religion was also repressed. At first, Soviet rule favored mostly the Eastern Orthodox Church, and some Islamic religious streams were preserved (see Jadidism, Wäisi movement), but later they also were repressed. Some theologians of Jadidism (which was liberal to Soviet rule at first) escaped to Turkey or Egypt.

More than 560,000 Tatarstan soldiers took part in World War II and more than 300,000 of them were killed. Many Soviet plants and their workers, as well as the Soviet Academy of Sciences, were evacuated to Tatarstan. During the war large petroleum deposits were discovered. During their exploration, Tatarstan became one of the most industrially developed regions of the Soviet Union.

In 1960s-1970s Tatar ASSR's industry was developed not only in the petrol sector; a major car plant, KamAZ was built in Naberezhnye Chelny, making this city become the second largest in the republic. Other major cities, built and developed in those years are Nizhnekamsk and Almetyevsk.

== Post-Soviet history ==
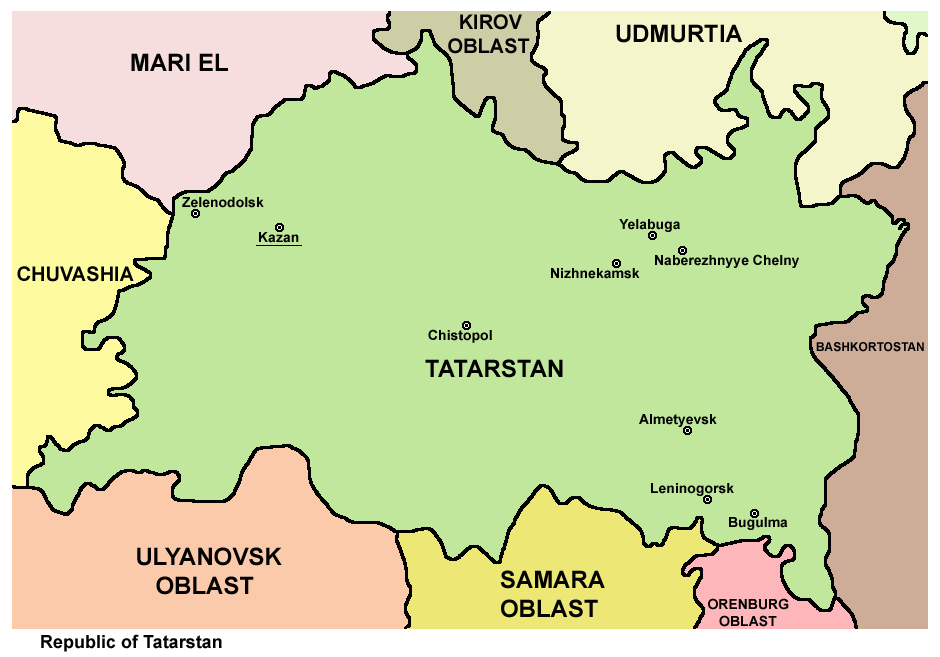
Tatarstan map

The Supreme Council of TASSR changed Tatarstan's status on 30 August 1990 and a declaration of sovereignty of the Tatarstan Soviet Socialistic Republic was made.

- 12 June 1991: The first elections for President of Tatarstan. Mintimer Shaymiev was elected.
- 21 March 1992: Referendum held regarding Tatarstan's status. The majority of the population supported Tatarstan's independence.
- November 1992: The Constitution of Tatarstan was accepted by parliament.
- 1994: The Treaty On Delimitation of Jurisdictional Subjects and Mutual Delegation of Authority between the State Bodies of the Russian Federation and the State Bodies of the Republic of Tatarstan was signed. Tatarstan becomes a de facto constituent republic of the Russian Federation.
- 1995 and 1999 elections held for the Governmental Council of Tatarstan.
- March 2002: Numerous amendments to Tatarstan's Constitution. Tatarstan officials officially declared Tatarstan to be a part of Russia.

On 20 December 2008, in response to Russia recognizing Abkhazia and South Ossetia, the Milli Mejlis of the Tatar People declared Tatarstan independent and asked for United Nations recognition. However this declaration was ignored both by the United Nations and the Russian government.
