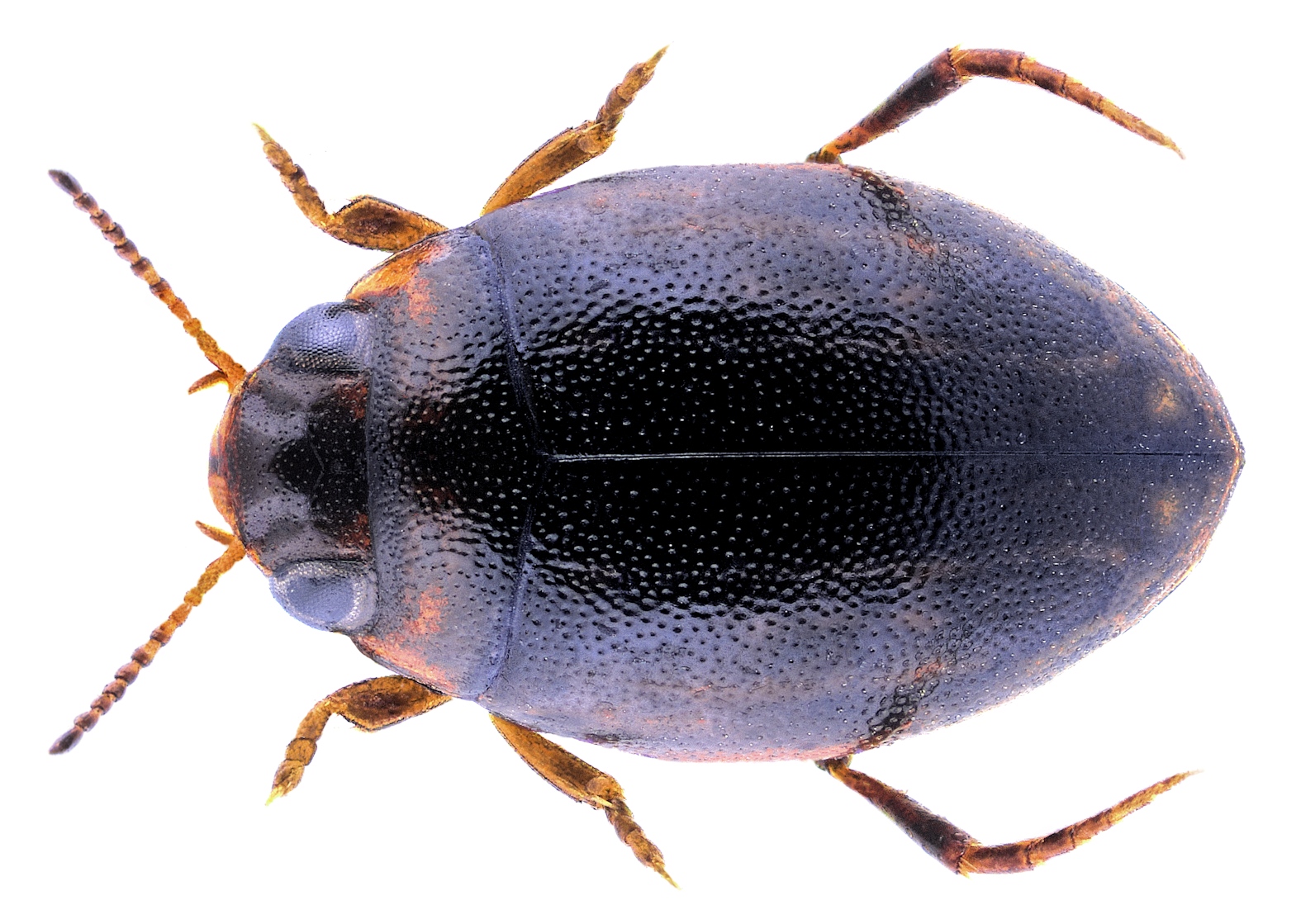

Scientific classification
- Kingdom: Animalia
- Phylum: Arthropoda
- Clade: Pancrustacea
- Class: Insecta
- Order: Coleoptera
- Suborder: Adephaga
- Family: Dytiscidae
- Genus: Herophydrus
- Species: H. musicus

Binomial name
- Herophydrus musicus (Klug, 1834)

Synonyms
- Hydroporus musicus Klug, 1834; Hygrotus alei Abdul-Karim & Ali, 1986; Coelambus musicus (Klug), Sharp, 1882; Hypophorus musicus (Klug), Zaitzev, 1972; Herophydrus (Hyphoporus) musicus (Klug), Rico et al. 1990; Hydroporus fractilinea Solsky, 1874; Coelambus interruptus Sharp, 1882

= Herophydrus musicus =

Species of beetle

Herophydrus musicus, is a species of predaceous diving beetle found in Asia and Europe.

== Distribution ==
The species is widely distributed throughout Middle East, European and Asian regions. It is found in Afghanistan, China, Europe, Iran, Iraq, Israel, Kazakhstan, Myanmar, Nepal, North Africa, India, Pakistan, Sri Lanka, Syria, Tajikistan, Turkey, Uzbekistan and Yemen. It is the only species of the genus Herophydrus occurring on the European mainland. In Europe, the beetle is found in Spain, Italy, Greece, Malta, Maltese Islands, Ukraine, Armenia, Azerbaijan, the South European Territory of Russia, Canary Islands, Croatia, Bulgaria and the Greek island of Peloponnese.

== Description ==
This small species has a body length of 2.88 to 3.60 mm. Their heads are shiny and almost totally pale, ferrugineous in colour, and without dark interocular marking. Sometimes they have a narrow, darkened posterior area. Their heads show fine punctation that is scattered and irregularly distributed. A densely punctate, narrow furrow appears at their inner eye margin. The frontal margin of their head is incomplete and laterally well-developed. Their antennae are pale and ferrugineous. Their pronotum is shiny and, like their heads and antennae, pale and ferrugineous in colour. Additionally, their bodies have a lateral outline that varies from curved to almost straight. A fairly narrow darkened area is visible both anteriorly and posteriorly, and its punctation is dense to fairly dense and slightly irregularly distributed. Their elytra are shiny, pale and ferrugineous, with markings varying in colour from dark ferrugineous to blackish. Occasionally, they have strongly reduced dark stripes. Punctation of their elytra is fine and densely distributed. Their ventrum ranges from blackish to dark ferrugineous. The prothorax is pale, ferrugineous and shiny, with punctation that is coarse to rather fine and irregularly distributed. Their legs are pale and ferrugineous, with the lower parts of their hind legs being much darker. Their protarsi and mesotarsi are slightly enlarged. In males, the aedeagus is obtuse and lacks sharp lateral flaps dorsally.

Herophydrus musicus larvae are fusiform, with sclerites that are brownish. Stemmata are present. The second antennomere lacks second setae, whereas the third antennomere lacks a ventro-apical spinula. Their prementum possesses lateral spinulae.

== Biology ==
It is a desert species that inhabits small, exposed, sparsely or only partly vegetated bodies of water on heavy loam and clay soils. Beetle larvae are found in shallow irrigation ponds that have a substrate of sand and clay, as well as vegetation composed of Juncus and Typha angustifolia.

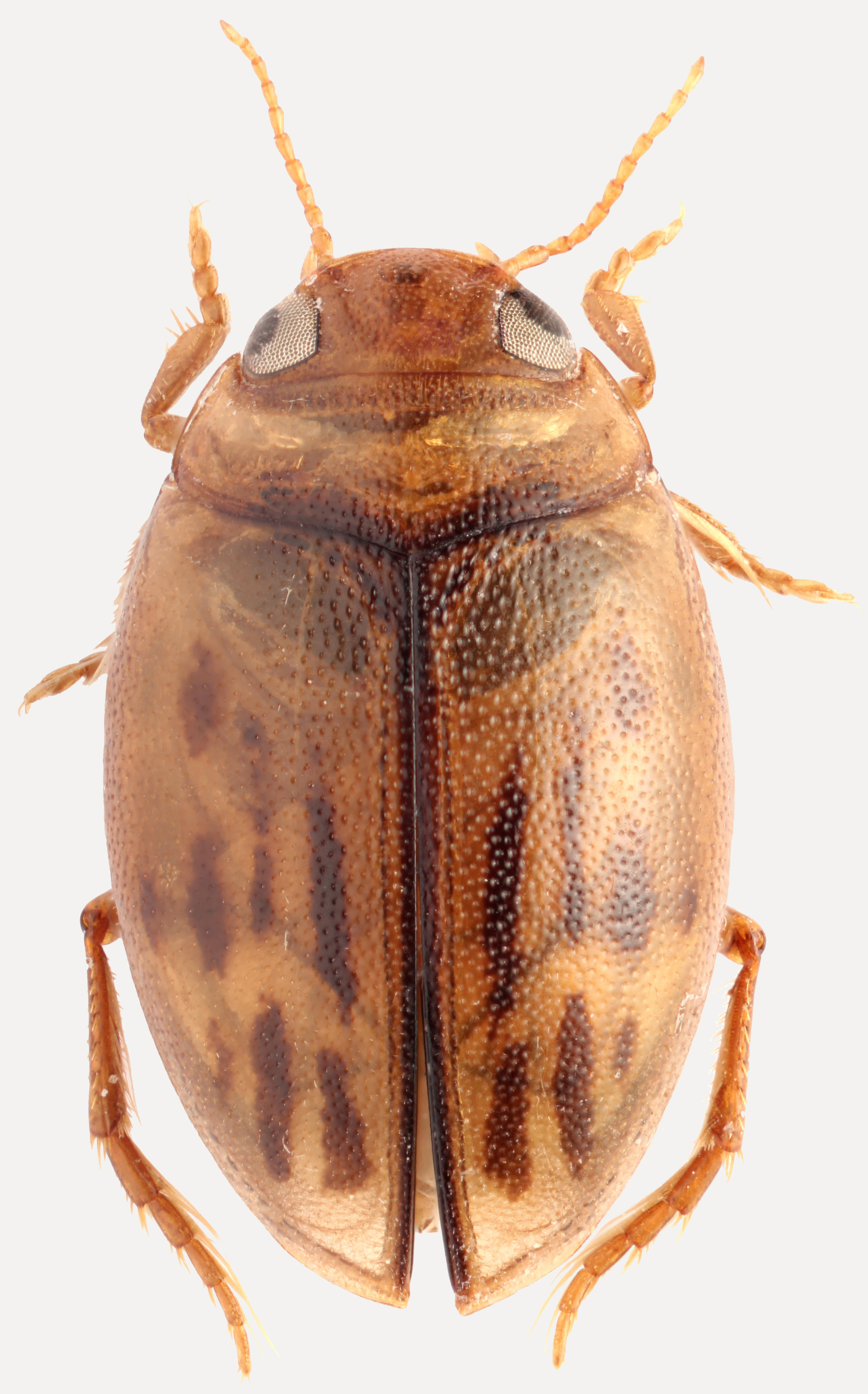
