= Pyany Bor culture =

Archaeological culture in Russia

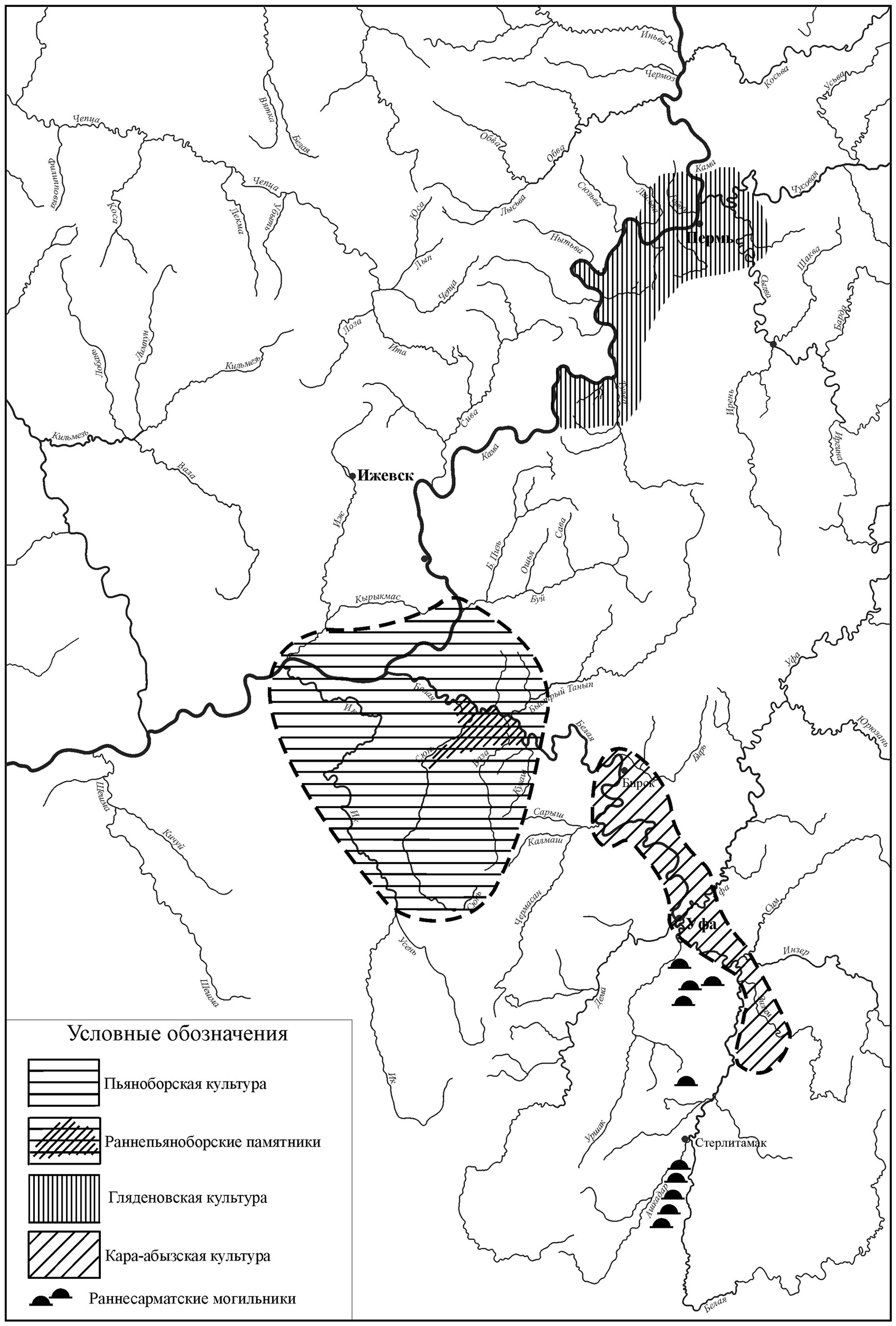
- Map of the Pyany Bor culture and adjacent cultures
- Geographical range: Volga region
- Period: Iron Age
- Dates: c. 200 BC – 200
- Preceded by: Ananyino culture
- Followed by: Azelino culture; Mazunino culture

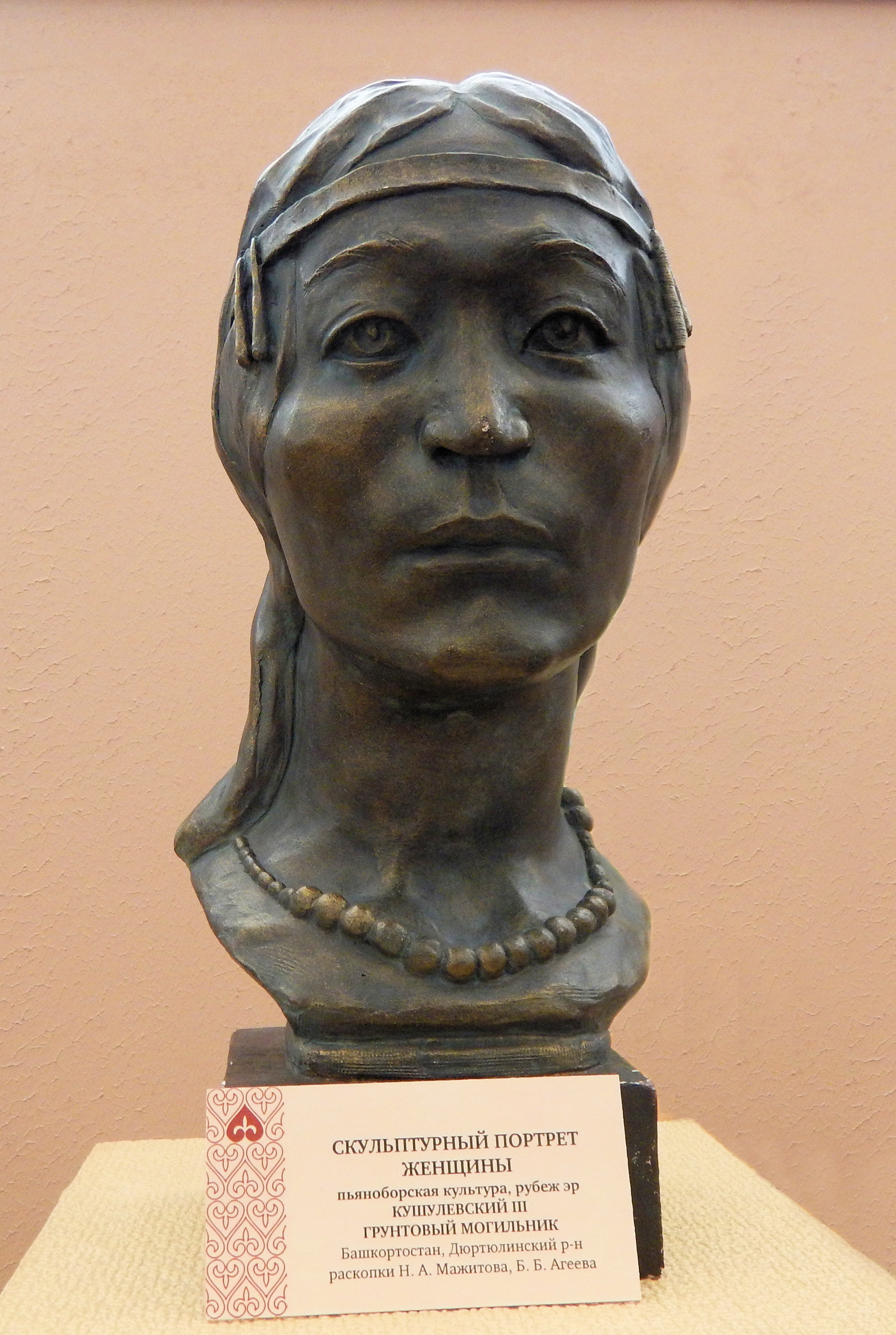
Reconstruction of a Pyany Bor woman from the Kushulevsky burial ground, Ufa Ethnographical Museum

The Pyany Bor culture (also transliterated Pjanobor or Pyanobor) is an Iron Age archaeological culture associated with the Volga and Ural regions of Russia.

The Pyany Bor culture developed from the lower Kama group of Ananyino culture. The Pyany Bor occupied territory north of the Kama and east of the Volga between the 2nd century BC and 2nd century AD. Subsistence was likely focused on pastoralism, hunting, and fishing. Through the Silk Routes, Pyany Bor people accessed goods from East Asia as well as the Roman Empire. They also traded with the nearby Andreevka-Pyseraly culture.

Domestic animals, particularly horses, feature prominently in Pyany Bor burials. Horse mandibles, skulls, and leg bones have been associated with Pyany Bor burial rituals. Wild animals were used for religious rituals; teeth and bones of predators were crafted into magical amulets and charms.

The Azelino and Mazuzino cultures are believed to have developed out of the Pyany Bor culture in the 3rd century.

== Sites ==
Pyany Bor sites are most concentrated along the lower Belaya and lower Kama rivers, where over 300 habitation and 40 burial sites have been identified.

Two Pyany Bor burial sites were excavated on islands in the Nizhnekamsk Reservoir between 1995 and 2009. The burials found were inhumations with characteristic artefacts and were dated to the early first millennium AD.

During excavation of a Pyany Bor burial ground at Staroe Kirgizovo in 2016, the grave of a child was discovered. The burial was dated to the 1st century BC or 1st century AD, and contained a large amount of grave goods, including weapons and a set of carved jaws of small predatory animals.

== Bibliography ==
- Klima, László (1996). "The linguistic affinity of the Volgaic Finno-Ugrians and their ethnogenesis" (PDF). Studia Histórica Fenno-Ugrica. 1.
- Sattarov, R. R.; et al. (2021). "Two Sites of Pyany Bor Culture on the Islands of Nizhnekamsk Reservoir". The Volga River Region Archaeology (in Russian). 1 (35): 93–113. doi:10.24852/pa2021.1.35.93.113.
- Vyazov, Leonid; et al. (2019). "Demographic Changes, Trade Routes, and the Formation of Anthropogenic Landscapes in the Middle Volga Region in the Past 2500 Years". In Yang, Liang Emlyn; et al. (eds.). Socio-Environmental Dynamics along the Historical Silk Road. Springer. pp. 411–454. doi:10.1007/978-3-030-00728-7. ISBN 9783030007287.
- Zubov, S. E. (2021). "The animal world in cults and jewelry of the Pyany Bor culture: to the problem formulation (based on the materials from the archaeological excavations of the monuments in the Belaya-Syun' interfluve region)". Ufa Archaeological Herald (in Russian). 21 (1). doi:10.31833/uav/2021.21.1.007.
- Zubov, S. E.; et al. (2021). "Boy Hunter Burial from Staroe Kirgizovo Burial Ground of the Pyany Bor Culture". The Volga River Region Archaeology (in Russian). 1 (35): 65–77. doi:10.24852/pa2021.1.35.65.77.
