= Aeschremon ochrealis =

Scientific classification
- Kingdom: Animalia
- Phylum: Arthropoda
- Clade: Pancrustacea
- Class: Insecta
- Order: Lepidoptera
- Family: Crambidae
- Genus: Aeschremon
- Species: A. ochrealis

Binomial name
- Aeschremon ochrealis Asselbergs, 2008

Species of moth

Aeschremon ochrealis is a moth in the family Crambidae. It was described by Jan Asselbergs in 2008 and is found in the United Arab Emirates.
