= Aeschremon kabylalis =

Scientific classification
- Kingdom: Animalia
- Phylum: Arthropoda
- Clade: Pancrustacea
- Class: Insecta
- Order: Lepidoptera
- Family: Crambidae
- Genus: Aeschremon
- Species: A. kabylalis

Binomial name
- Aeschremon kabylalis (Rebel, 1902)

Synonyms
- Tegostoma kabylalis Rebel, 1902; Euschraemon nigronaevalis Mabille, 1906

Species of moth

Aeschremon kabylalis is a moth in the family Crambidae. It was described by Rebel in 1902. It is found in Algeria.
