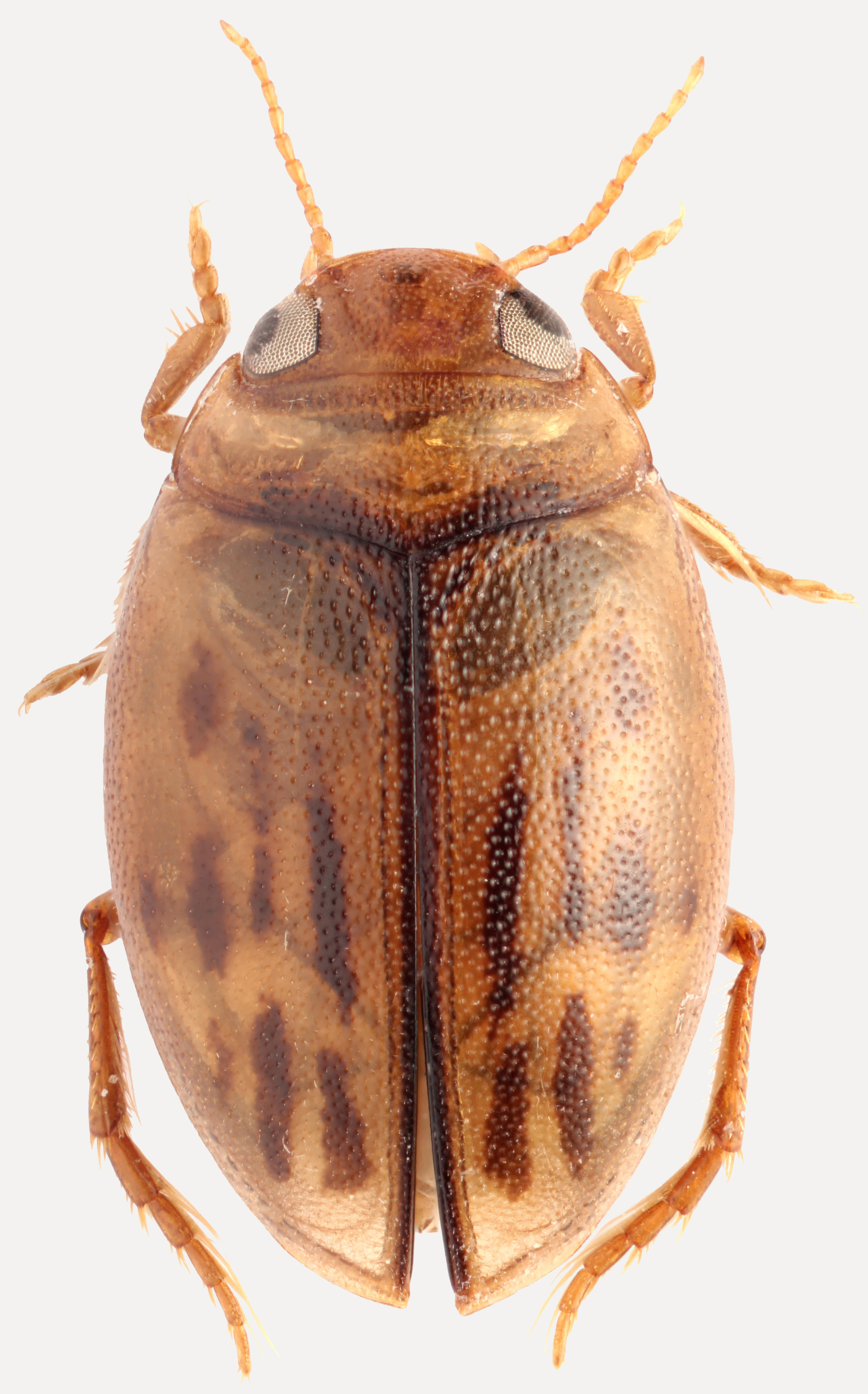
- Herophydrus musicus

Scientific classification
- Kingdom: Animalia
- Phylum: Arthropoda
- Class: Insecta
- Order: Coleoptera
- Suborder: Adephaga
- Family: Dytiscidae
- Genus: Herophydrus; Sharp, 1882

= Herophydrus =

Genus of beetles

Herophydrus is a genus of beetles in the family Dytiscidae, containing the following species:

- Herophydrus assimilis Régimbart, 1895
- Herophydrus bilardoi Biström & Nilsson, 2002
- Herophydrus capensis Régimbart, 1895
- Herophydrus cleopatrae (Peyron, 1858)
- Herophydrus confusus Régimbart, 1895
- Herophydrus discrepatus Guignot, 1954
- Herophydrus endroedyi Biström & Nilsson, 2002
- Herophydrus gigantoides Biström & Nilsson, 2002
- Herophydrus gigas Régimbart, 1895
- Herophydrus gschwendtneri Omer-Cooper, 1957
- Herophydrus guineensis (Aubé, 1838)
- Herophydrus heros Sharp, 1882
- Herophydrus hyphoporoides Régimbart, 1895
- Herophydrus ignoratus Gschwendtner, 1933
- Herophydrus inquinatus (Boheman, 1848)
- Herophydrus janssensi Guignot, 1952
- Herophydrus kalaharii Gschwendtner, 1935
- Herophydrus morandi Guignot, 1952
- Herophydrus musicus (Klug, 1834)
- Herophydrus muticus (Sharp, 1882)
- Herophydrus natator Biström & Nilsson, 2002
- Herophydrus nigrescens Biström & Nilsson, 2002
- Herophydrus nodieri (Régimbart, 1895)
- Herophydrus obscurus Sharp, 1882
- Herophydrus obsoletus Régimbart, 1895
- Herophydrus ovalis Gschwendtner, 1932
- Herophydrus pallidus Omer-Cooper, 1931
- Herophydrus pauliani Guignot, 1950
- Herophydrus quadrilineatus Régimbart, 1895
- Herophydrus ritsemae Régimbart, 1889
- Herophydrus rohani Peschet, 1924
- Herophydrus rufus (Clark, 1863)
- Herophydrus sjostedti Régimbart, 1908
- Herophydrus spadiceus Sharp, 1882
- Herophydrus sudanensis Guignot, 1952
- Herophydrus tribolus Guignot, 1953
- Herophydrus variabilis Régimbart, 1906
- Herophydrus vaziranii (Nilsson, 1999)
- Herophydrus verticalis Sharp, 1882
- Herophydrus vittatus Régimbart, 1895
- Herophydrus wewalkai Biström & Nilsson, 2002
