= Aeschremon disparalis =

Scientific classification
- Kingdom: Animalia
- Phylum: Arthropoda
- Clade: Pancrustacea
- Class: Insecta
- Order: Lepidoptera
- Family: Crambidae
- Genus: Aeschremon
- Species: A. disparalis

Binomial name
- Aeschremon disparalis (Herrich-Schaffer, 1851)

Synonyms
- Tegostoma disparalis Herrich-Schaffer, 1851; Aeschremon disparalis f. indistinctalis Amsel, 1961; Tegostoma disparalis paralis Hampson, 1900

Species of moth

Aeschremon disparalis is a species of moth in the family Crambidae. It is found in Greece, Iran, Uzbekistan, Turkey and Russia.
