= Aeschremon tenalis =

Scientific classification
- Kingdom: Animalia
- Phylum: Arthropoda
- Clade: Pancrustacea
- Class: Insecta
- Order: Lepidoptera
- Family: Crambidae
- Genus: Aeschremon
- Species: A. tenalis

Binomial name
- Aeschremon tenalis Amsel, 1961

Species of moth

Aeschremon tenalis is a moth in the family Crambidae. It was described by Hans Georg Amsel in 1961. It is found in Iran.
