= Aeschremon =

Scientific classification
- Kingdom: Animalia
- Phylum: Arthropoda
- Clade: Pancrustacea
- Class: Insecta
- Order: Lepidoptera
- Family: Crambidae
- Subfamily: Odontiinae
- Tribe: Odontiini
- Genus: Aeschremon; Lederer, 1863

Genus of moths

Aeschremon is a genus of moths of the family Crambidae.

== Species ==
- Aeschremon conchylialis (Christoph, 1872)
- Aeschremon desertalis Asselbergs, 2008
- Aeschremon disparalis (Herrich-Schäffer, 1851)
- Aeschremon kabylalis (Rebel, 1902)
- Aeschremon ochrealis Asselbergs, 2008
- Aeschremon similis Asselbergs, 2008
- Aeschremon tenalis Amsel, 1961
