= Starokirgizovo =

Starokirgizovo Старокиргизово
- Selo
- Location within Bashkortostan Location within Russia
- Coordinates: 55°40′N 54°19′E
- Country: Russia
- Region: Bashkortostan
- District: Ilishevsky District
- Time zone: UTC+5:00

Starokirgizovo (Russian: Старокиргизово; Bashkir: Иҫке Ҡырғыҙ, İśke Qırğıź) is a rural locality (a selo) in Novomedvedevsky Selsoviet, Ilishevsky District, Bashkortostan, Russia. The population was 439 as of 2010. There are 5 streets.

== Geography ==
Starokirgizovo is located 34 km north of Verkhneyarkeyevo (the district's administrative centre) by road. Novomedvedevo is the nearest rural locality.
