= Cangali bek =

Tatar dukes and mirzas

Canğäli (Chuvash: Еналей Jenalej, IPA: [jenaˈlʲej]; Tatar: Җангали; Russian: Еналей Шугуров Yenaley Shugurov) (died 1616) was a Tatar nobleman, the leader of the Canğäli movement in 1615–16 against Russia. In 1616 he was caught and killed in Kazan by Russian troops.
