= History of the Tartars =

History of the Tartars or Historia Tartarorum may refer to:

- the Tartar Relation of C. de Bridia (1247)
- the Historia Tartarorum of Simon of Saint-Quentin (before 1253)
- the Tatar sections of the Flor des estoires de la terre d'Orient of Hayton of Corycus (1307)
