= Southern Russia =

Geographic region of Russia

Coordinates: 45.4000°N 43.0000°E

General map of Russia without occupied Ukrainian territories, showing Southern Russia in color (the Southern Federal District in blue and the North Caucasian Federal District in red).

Southern Russia or the South of Russia (Russian: Юг России, IPA: [juk rɐˈsʲiɪ]) is a colloquial term for the southernmost geographic portion of European Russia. The term is generally used to refer to the region of Russia's Southern Federal District and North Caucasian Federal District.

The term is informal and does not conform to any official areas of the Russian Federation as designated by the Russian Classification on Objects of Administrative Division (OKATO).

== History ==
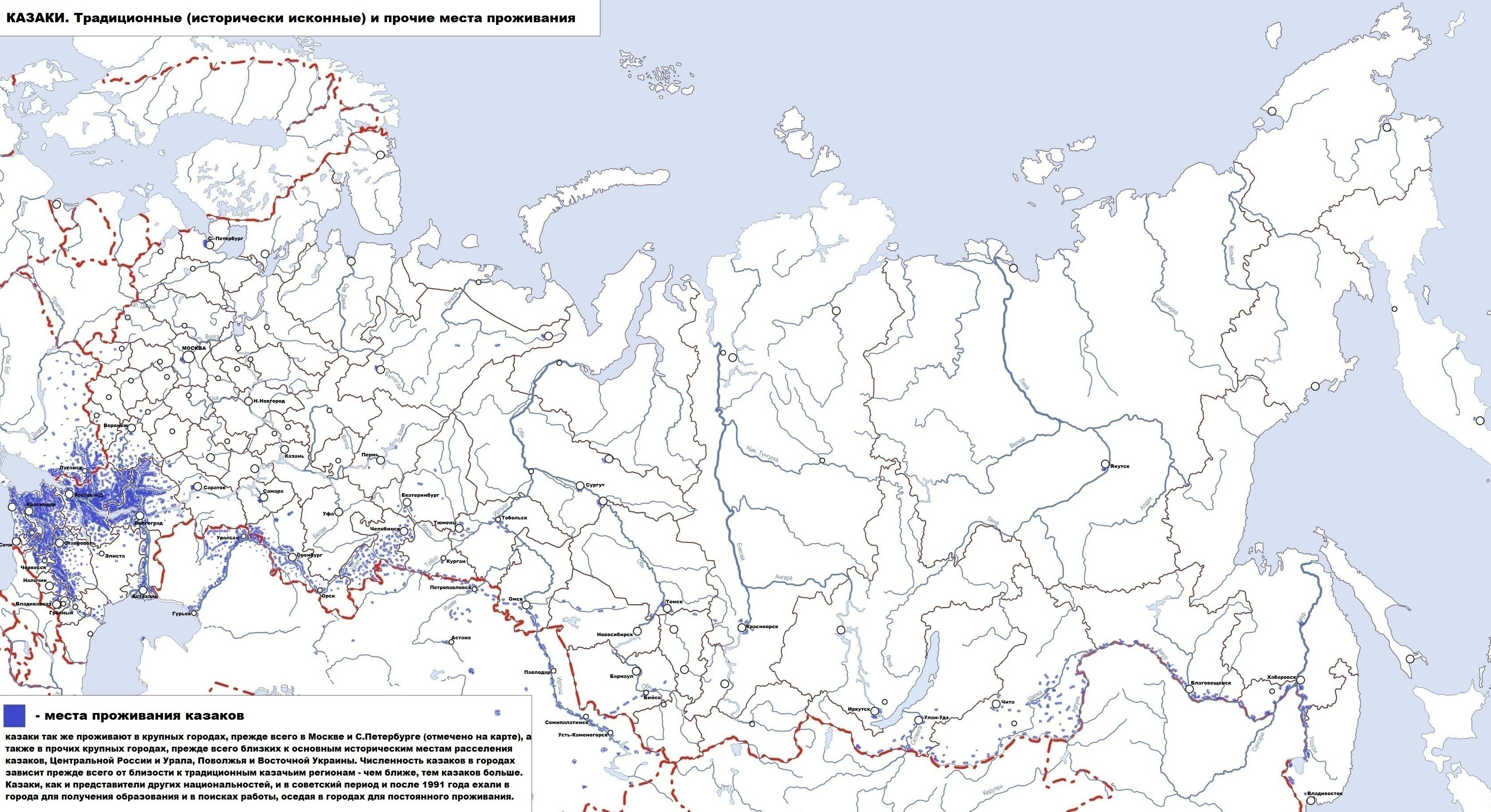
Distribution of Cossacks in the Russian Federation (primarily concentrated in the Northern and Southern federal districts)

Early humans have inhabited the Caucasus and Pontic–Caspian steppe for millennia, since the Prehistoric Age. During the Early Middle Ages, the Eastern Slavic tribes, such as the Antes, settled in the southern region of European Russia from the 3rd century onwards. Southern Russia played an important role in the influence of Byzantine culture on Kievan Rus' and its successor state, the Tsardom of Russia. Moreover, Persian culture has also contributed to enrich the cultural heritage of Southern Russia.

During the Late Middle Ages, the Caucasus was invaded by the Mongols and their Turkic vassals. The latter tribes established a Tatar state in the region, formerly located between the Volga and Don rivers. According to historical sources, the region was subjected to Turkification and peoples that inhabited the lands of Southern Russia converted to Islam during that time, after contact with the Mongols.

During the Russian Civil War (1917–1922), a military quasi-state called "South Russia" briefly existed from 1919 to 1920, which spanned the southern region of the Russian Empire, including portions of present-day Ukraine. In Soviet historiography, it also was referred to as "White South", in reference to the White Army that fought the Bolsheviks there along with the Armed Forces of South Russia and the Volunteer Army.

== General area ==
Since the dissolution of the Soviet Union in 1991, the area of Southern Russia spans two of the nine federal districts of Russia containing 19 federal constituent entities, six of which are disputed with Ukraine:

- Southern Federal District:
  - Republic of Adygea
  - Astrakhan Oblast
  - Republic of Crimea (Note: Annexed by Russia in 2014; recognized internationally as a part of Ukraine.)
  - Republic of Kalmykia
  - Krasnodar Krai
  - Rostov Oblast
  - Federal city of Sevastopol
  - Volgograd Oblast
- Divisions occupied and claimed by Russia in 2022: (Note: Recognized internationally as a part of Ukraine.)
  - Donetsk People's Republic
  - Kherson Oblast
  - Luhansk People's Republic
  - Zaporozhye Oblast
- North Caucasian Federal District:
  - Republic of Dagestan
  - Republic of Ingushetia
  - Kabardino-Balkar Republic
  - Karachay-Cherkess Republic
  - Republic of North Ossetia-Alania
  - Stavropol Krai
  - Chechen Republic

In relation to the official economic regions of Russia, most of Southern Russia is included in the North Caucasus economic region, with the exception of the Astrakhan Oblast, the Republic of Kalmykia and the Volgograd Oblast, which are part of the Volga economic region. References to "Southern Russia" can be found in media or news portals devoted to the area. Newspapers and websites like Rossiyskaya Gazeta and Vedomosti have sections or tags for the area.

== See also ==
- Annexation of Crimea by the Russian Empire
  - De-Tatarization of Crimea
  - Russification
  - Taurida Oblast
- Division of the Mongol Empire
- East Slavic languages
  - Northern Russian dialects
  - Southern Russian dialects
- Federal districts of Russia
  - Subdivisions of Russia
- Former states in the North Caucasus:
  - Chechen Republic of Ichkeria (1991–2000)
  - Checheno-Ingush Autonomous Soviet Socialist Republic (1934–1993)
  - Dagestan Autonomous Soviet Socialist Republic (1921–1992)
  - Mountain Autonomous Soviet Socialist Republic (1921–1924)
  - North Ossetian Autonomous Soviet Socialist Republic (1936–1993)
