= Ananyino culture =

Archaeological culture in Russia

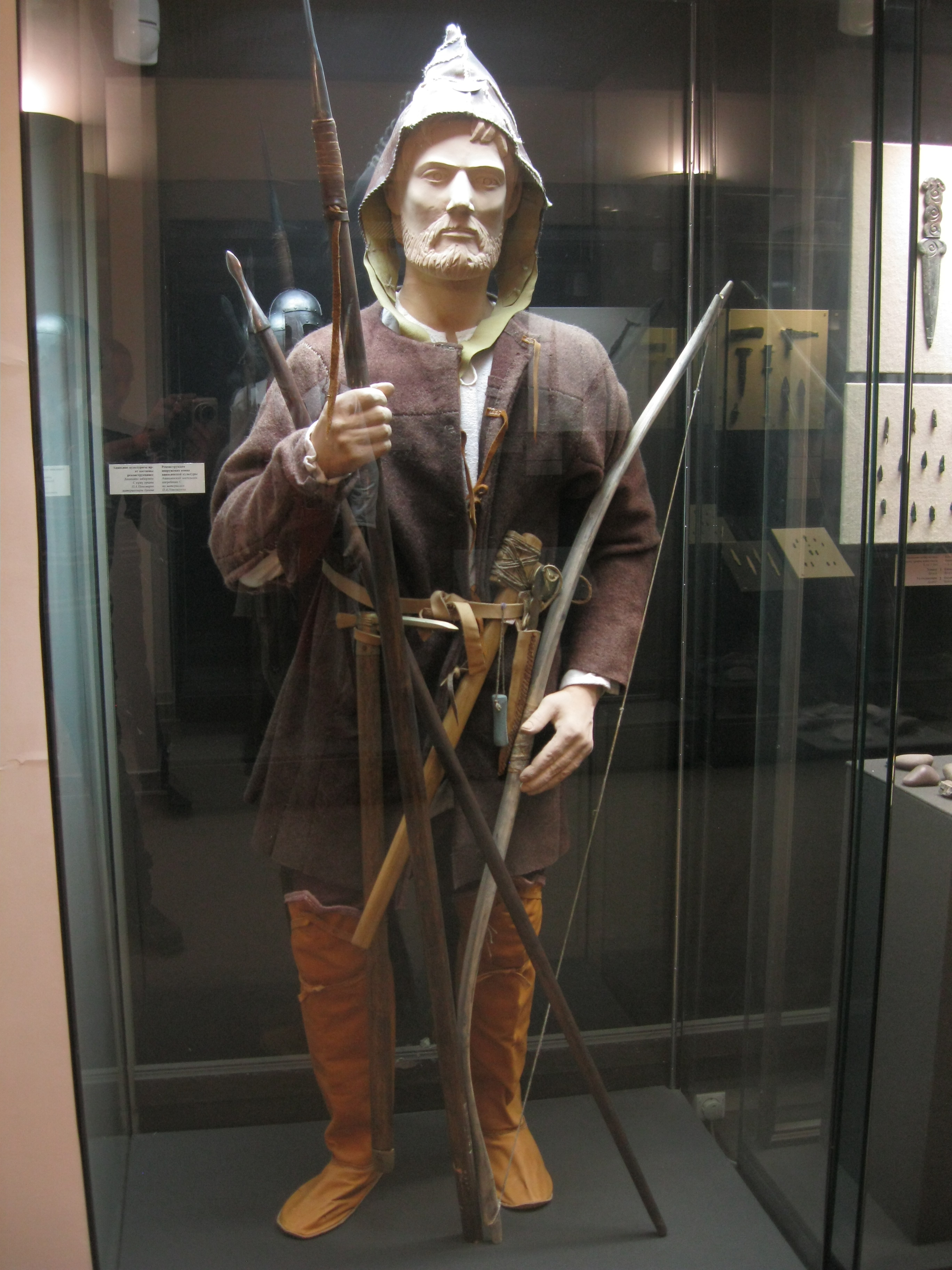
- Reconstructed costume of the Ananyino people.
- Geographical range: Volga region
- Period: Iron Age
- Dates: c. 900 BC – 200 BC
- Preceded by: Maklasheevka culture
- Followed by: Pyany Bor culture

The Ananyino culture and contemporary cultures circa 500 BCE

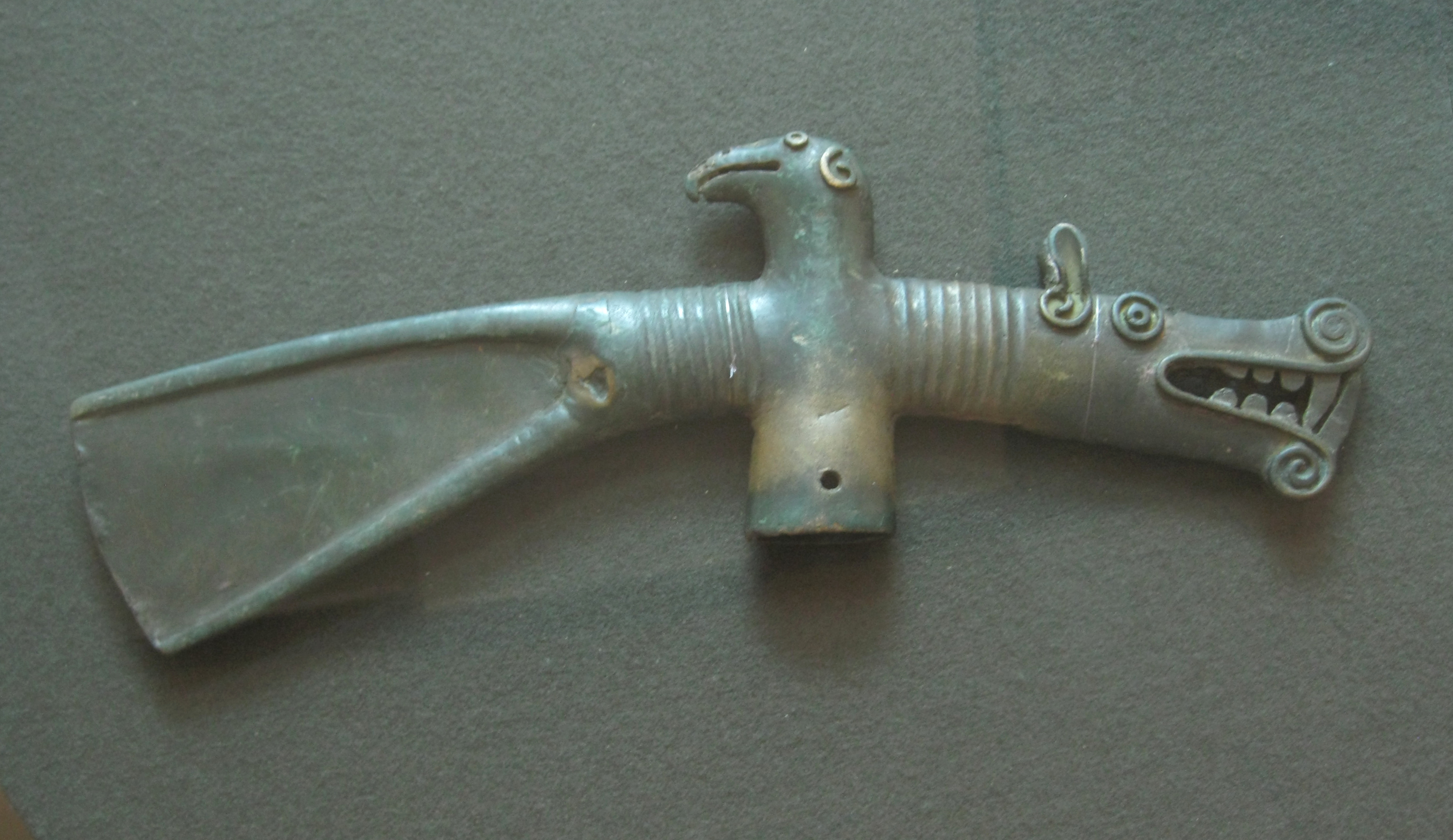
Axe; circa 7th-5th century BC; bronze; National Museum of the Republic of Tatarstan (Kazan, Russia)

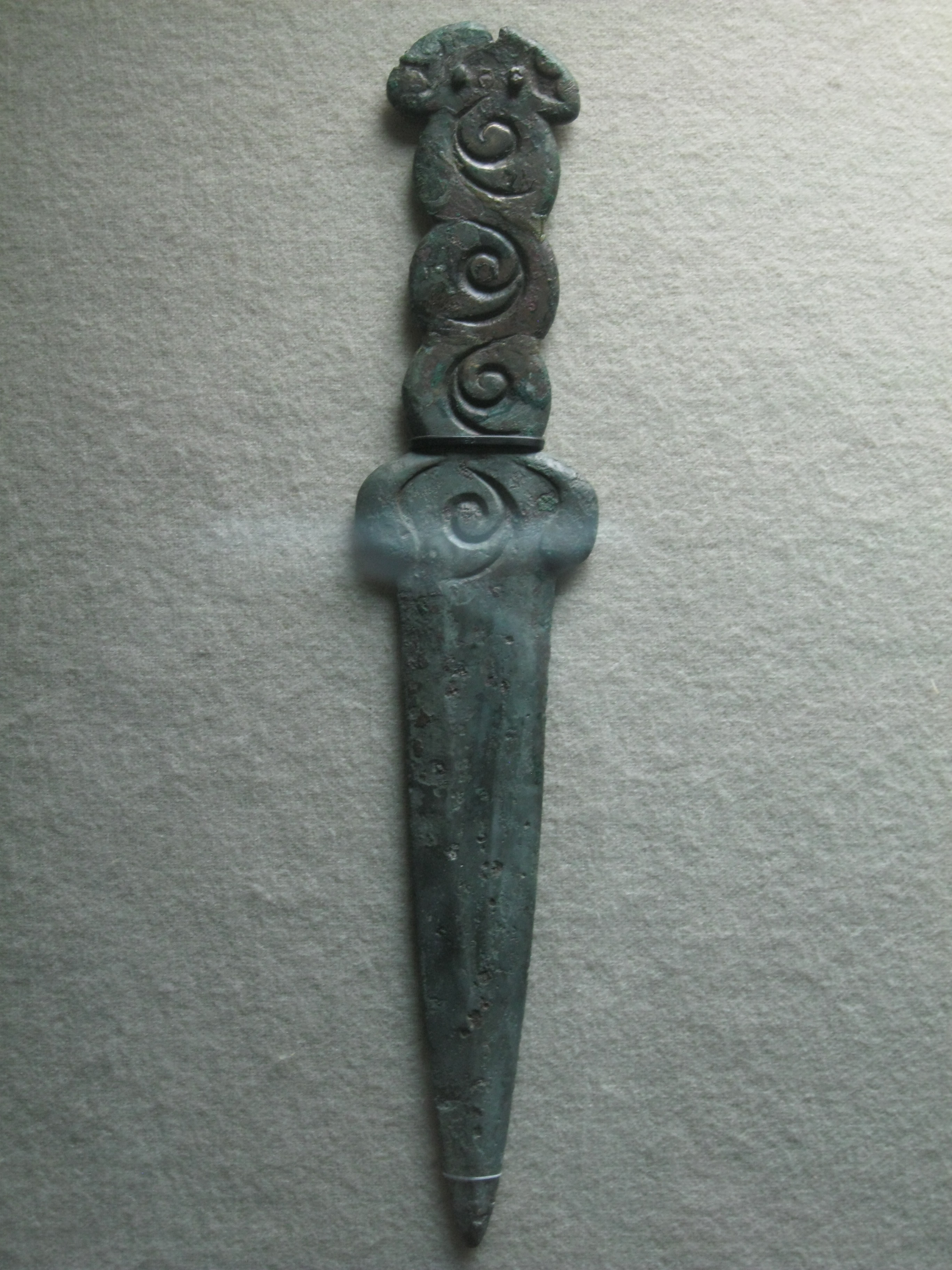
Dagger; circa 5th century BC; bronze; National Museum of the Republic of Tatarstan

The Ananyino culture is an archaeological culture of the late 8th to 3rd centuries BCE in present-day Tatarstan, Russian Federation. The name comes from the burials first discovered near the village Ananyino (Ананьино) in the vicinity of Elabuga, excavated by P.V.Alabin and I.V.Shishkin in 1858.

It is located in the territory of the Middle Volga (from the Vetluga River to the town of Ulyanovsk) and the Kama River basin. In the southeast the culture stretches along the lower course of the Belaya River, from its mouth up to the town of Birsk (fortresses Novokabanov, Kakrykul, Peter-Tau, Anachev, Tra-Tau, Trikol, Novobiktov, Birsk settlement, Tash-Elga burials). In the Volga-Kama area and more northerly the culture extends to the Pechora River and Subarctic Ural.

In the Volga and Lower Kama areas the traces of the Ananyino Culture fade in the 6th century BCE, in other areas in the 3rd to 2nd centuries BCE.

== Archaeological monuments ==
Unfortified settlements, fortresses and burials have been found. In the settlements and fortresses the remains of surface timber dwellings (10×5 m - 12×4 м) were found. In the Konetsgor settlement long houses divided into sections with hearths located on their longitudinal axis were found. The population was engaged in cattle breeding and agriculture, as well as hunting and fishing. Well developed were both iron and nonferrous metallurgy, bronze casting and forging, weaving, spinning, bone and leatherwork, and pottery. Typical ceramics are round-bottomed with indented and rope decorations. In the settlements are many bone utensils, mainly for hunting and fishing, like arrowheads of various forms, harpoons, mattock tips.

The burial sites are without mounds and sometimes very extensive. The older Akhmylov cemetery contained more than 1100 burials. The earliest of them had stone stelae with depictions of weaponry beside the burial. In the 6th or 5th century BC they were replaced with stelae above the tombs, sometimes with male images with or without weapons. Inhumations in pit tombs, covered with timber chambers predominate. Single burials prevailed, but paired and collective, dismembered (reburials) and partial (skulls) burials are also known. Burials were in some cases accompanied by meat offerings (horsemeat for men and beef for women), and various objects, including clay vessels. In the male burials are usually found weapons and work tools including spears, kelts, swords, daggers, arrowheads, wedges, and ornaments. In the female tombs are ornaments including bracelets, neckrings, sets of pendants and tubules sown on a leather headband). In the early period bronze and iron tools and weapons co-existed with flint arrowheads and scrapers.

The Ananyino culture was greatly influenced by the Colchian-Koban cultures of the Caucasus region, the Scythians, and the eastern nomadic cultures of the Eurasian steppes. Especially significant were the links of the Ananyino people with the Caucasus cultures, represented by numerous imported products. It was determined that technological methods for iron processing ascend to the Caucasian traditions.

== Language ==
The Ananyino people apparently belonged to the Finno-Ugric group. In the north-eastern part of the basin formed the Proto-Permians, in its western part tribes of Volga Finns.
