= Villanovan culture =

Iron age culture in Italy

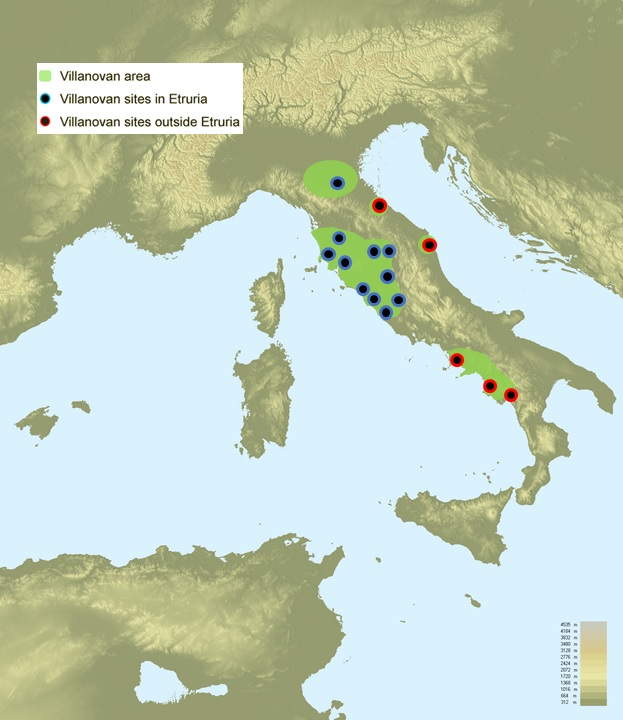
- Geographical range: Europe (Italy: Emilia-Romagna, Tuscany, Lazio, Campania)
- Period: Early Iron Age, Early phases of the Etruscan civilization
- Dates: c. 900–700 BCE
- Preceded by: Proto-Villanovan culture
- Followed by: Orientalizing period (later 700–500 BCE) of the Etruscan civilization

The Villanovan culture (c. 900–700 BCE), regarded as the earliest phase of the Etruscan civilization, was the earliest Iron Age culture of Italy. It directly followed the Bronze Age Proto-Villanovan culture which branched off from the Urnfield culture of Central Europe. The name derives from the locality of Villanova, a fraction of the municipality of Castenaso in the Metropolitan City of Bologna where, between 1853 and 1855, Giovanni Gozzadini found the remains of a necropolis, bringing to light 193 tombs, of which there were 179 cremations and 14 inhumations.

The Villanovans introduced ironworking to the Italian Peninsula. They practiced cremation and buried the ashes of their dead in biconical ceramic funerary urns. The burial characteristics relate the Villanovan culture to the Central European Urnfield culture (c. 1300–750 BCE) and to the Hallstatt culture, which succeeded it. In their initial phases, it is not possible to distinguish them from one another.

== Discovery ==
The Villanovan culture takes its name from Villanova, a locality near present-day Castenaso, about 12 kilometres (7.5 mi) east of Bologna in northern Italy. Between 1853 and 1855, the scholar and landowner Giovanni Gozzadini excavated a cemetery there and uncovered 193 graves. Of the graves he excavated, 179 contained cremated remains and 14 contained burials of uncremated individuals. The finds would later be recognized as evidence of the earliest phase of Etruscan civilization.

Many of the graves were stone-lined pits containing cinerary urns. Most had escaped extensive looting, allowing archaeologists to recover grave goods and other evidence of how Villanovan people buried their dead. Six graves were set apart from the others, which may indicate differences in social status within the community.

In 1893, a chance discovery at Verucchio, overlooking the Adriatic coastal plain, revealed another distinctive Villanovan necropolis.

== Periodization ==
The Villanovan culture is broadly divided into Villanovan I from c. 960 BCE to c. 801 BCE and the Villanovan II from c. 800 BCE to 720 BCE. The later phase (Villanovan II) saw radical changes, evidence of contact with Hellenic civilization and trade with the north along the Amber Road. This evidence takes the form of glass and amber necklaces for women, armor and horse harness fittings of bronze, and the development of elite graves in contrast to the earlier egalitarian culture. Chamber tombs and inhumation (burial) practices were developed side-by-side with the earlier cremation practices. With the last phase of Villanovan II the Etruscans, in particular Southern Etruria, entered the Orientalizing period. The northernmost areas of the Etruscan world, such as Etruria Padana, continued in their development as Villanovan III (750–680 BCE) and Villanovan IV (680–540 BCE).

=== Villanovan chronology within the Etruscan civilization ===
Etruscan civilization (900–27 BCE)	Villanovan period (900–720 BCE)	Villanovan I	900–800 BCE
Etruscan civilization (900–27 BCE)	Villanovan period (900–720 BCE)	Villanovan II	800–720 BCE
Etruscan civilization (900–27 BCE)	Villanovan period (900–720 BCE)	Villanovan III (Bologna area)	720-680 BCE
Etruscan civilization (900–27 BCE)	Villanovan period (900–720 BCE)	Villanovan IV (Bologna area)	680-540 BCE
Etruscan civilization (900–27 BCE)	Orientalizing period (720–580 BCE)	Early Orientalizing	720–680 BCE
Etruscan civilization (900–27 BCE)	Orientalizing period (720–580 BCE)	Middle Orientalizing	680–625 BCE
Etruscan civilization (900–27 BCE)	Orientalizing period (720–580 BCE)	Late Orientalizing	625–580 BCE
Etruscan civilization (900–27 BCE)	Archaic period (580–480 BCE)	Archaic	580–480 BCE
Etruscan civilization (900–27 BCE)	Classical period (480–320 BCE)	Classical	480–320 BCE
Etruscan civilization (900–27 BCE)	Hellenistic period (320–27 BCE)	Hellenistic	320–27 BCE

== Metalwork and trade ==
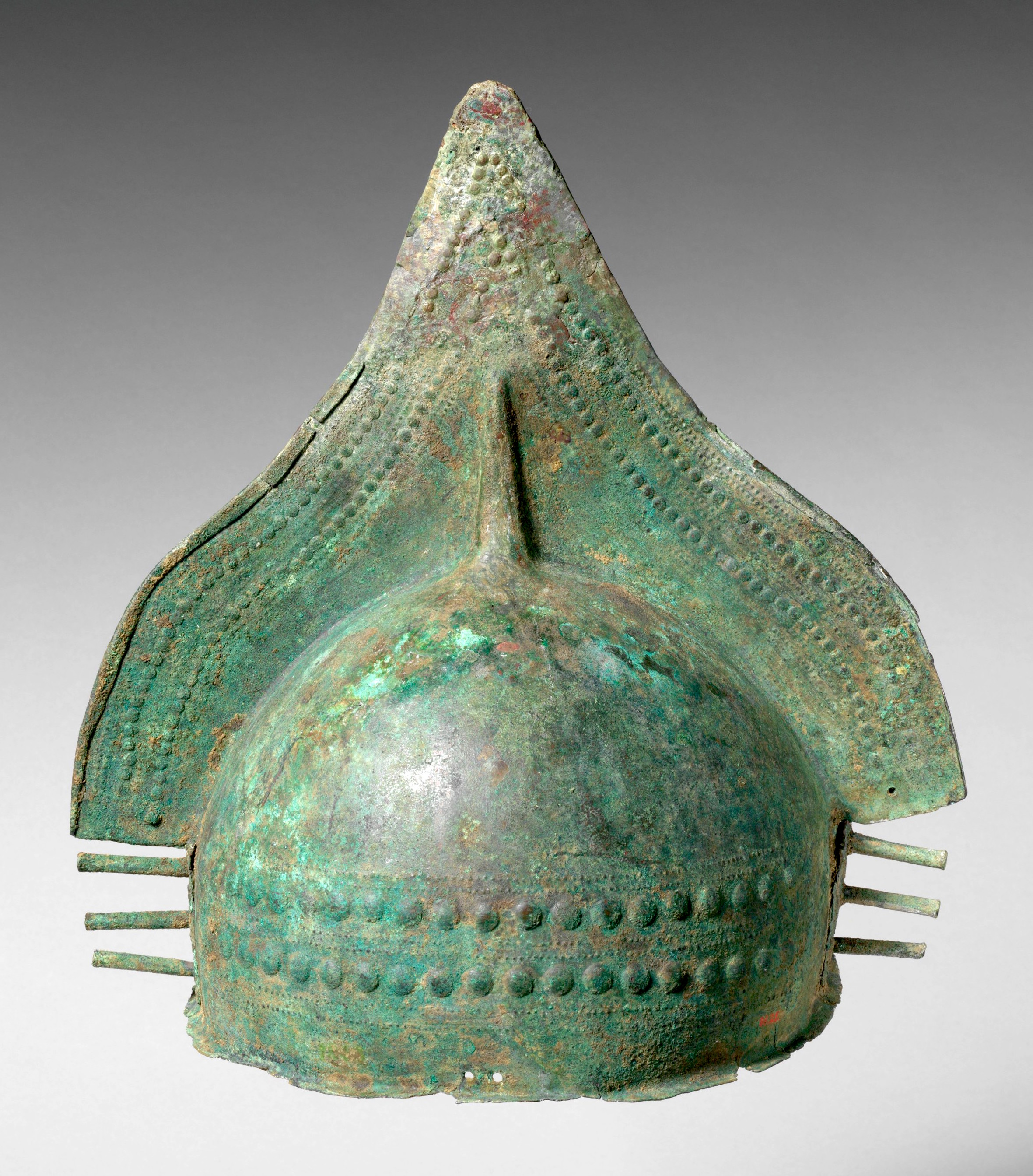
Bronze Villanovan crested helmet 9th century BCE, (Metropolitan Museum of Art, New York City)

The metalwork quality found in bronze and pottery demonstrate the skill of the Villanovan artisans. Some grave goods from burial sites display an even higher quality, suggesting the development of societal elites within Villanovan culture. Tools and items were placed in graves suggesting a belief in an afterlife. Men's graves contained weapons, armor, while those for women included weaving tools. A few graves switched or mixed these, indicating the possibility that some women employed tools and that some men made clothing.

During the Villanovan period Etruscans traded with other states from the Mediterranean such as Greeks, Balkans, and Sardinia. Trade brought about advancement in metallurgy, and Greek presence influenced Villanovan pottery.

== Housing ==
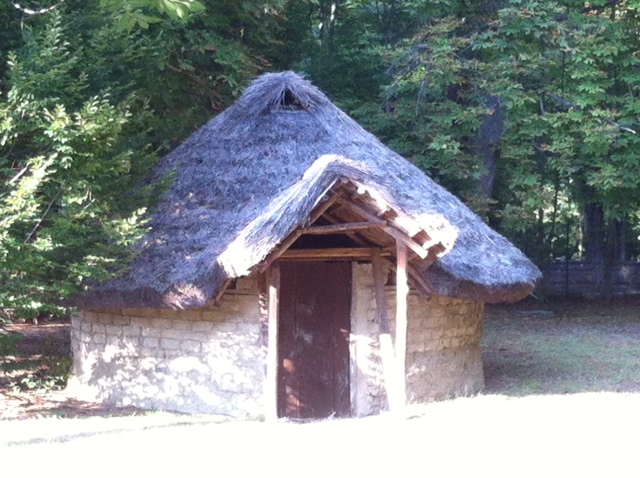
Reconstruction of a Villanovan hut in the Giardini Margherita, Bologna, Italy

Villanovan people lived in huts built from wattle and daub or sun-dried mud brick supported by wooden posts and covered with thatched roofs. Their homes could be rectangular, oval, or circular in shape. Some were designed for a single family, while the largest rectangular examples measured up to 13 by 7 metres (43 ft × 23 ft) and may have housed as many as ten people. Archaeological evidence, including preserved postholes and foundation trenches, has helped researchers reconstruct how these buildings were built.

The interiors of Villanovan homes contained cooking stands, household utensils, and the remains of animals prepared for food, providing evidence of daily life and domestic activities. Some homes also contained large pottery jars sunk into the floor for storing food. Rainwater was carried away through rock-cut drainage channels and collected in communal reservoirs.

== Funerary practices and grave goods ==
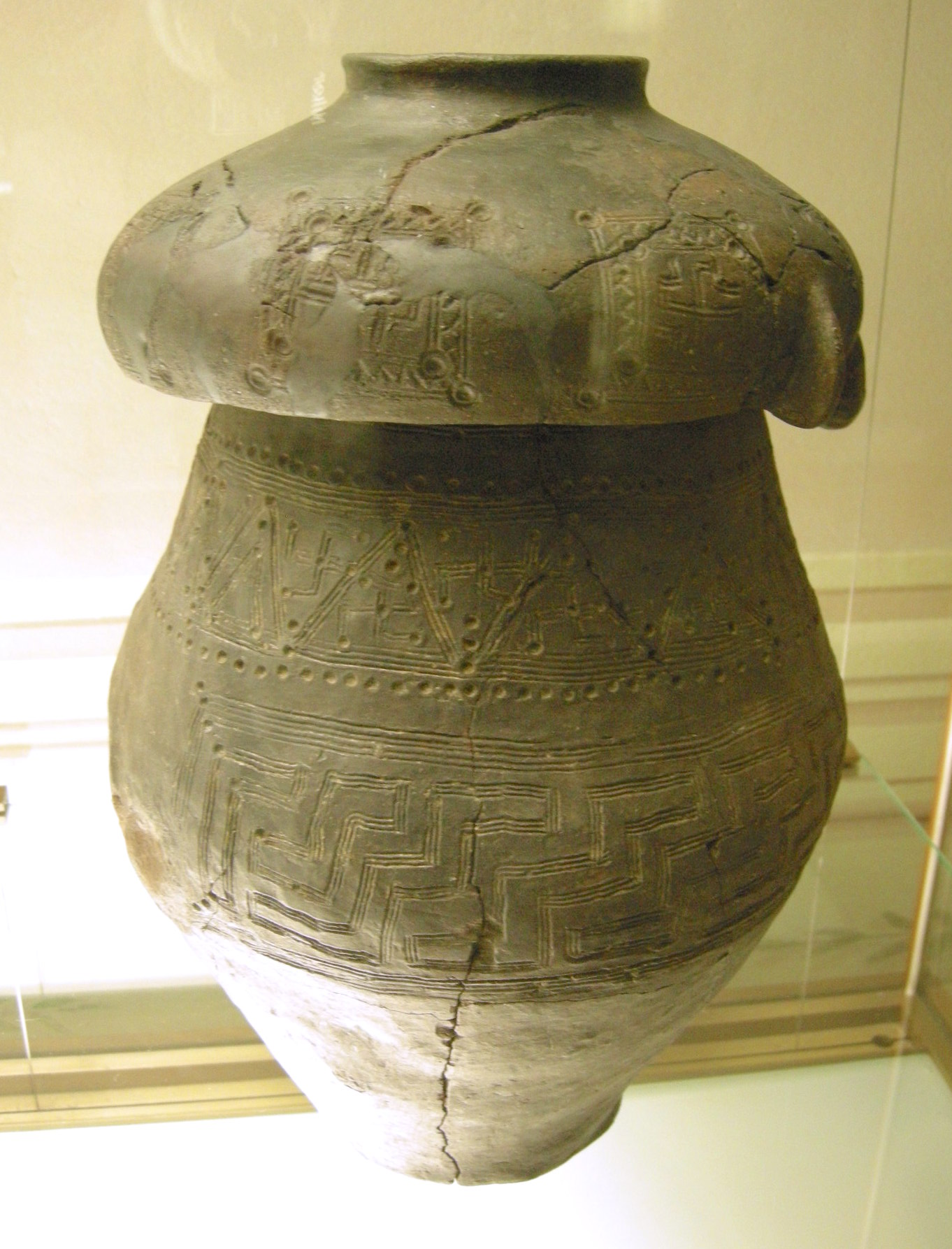
Villanovian double urn from Chiusi, Tuscany. 9th–7th century BC. (National Archaeological Museum of Florence)

Throughout most of the Villanovan period, from about 900 to 720 BCE, Villanovan people usually cremated their dead and buried the ashes in urns placed in graves. The most common urns were biconical in shape and made from impasto pottery, although some people were buried in distinctive hut-shaped urns modelled on Villanovan homes. These miniature structures preserve details of contemporary domestic architecture. Many urns were decorated with geometric designs, including meanders, squares, and swastikas, while some were topped with bronze helmets instead of ceramic lids. Villanovan cemeteries were often located on hilltops or in ravines outside settlements, and cremation urns were commonly placed in stone-lined pit graves.

Villanovan people buried a variety of objects alongside their dead. Common finds include bronze fibulae, razors, rings, weapons, armour, and weaving tools. Some burials contained objects more commonly associated with the opposite sex, indicating that grave goods did not always follow expected patterns. The inclusion of personal possessions and tools has been interpreted as evidence of a belief in an afterlife.

Beginning around 800 BCE, during the Villanovan II period, burial customs became more varied. Some Villanovan people continued earlier cremation practices, while others adopted inhumation burials and chamber tombs. At the same time, some graves became noticeably richer than others. Elite burials contained imported amber and glass jewellery, bronze armour, and horse-harness fittings. At sites such as Populonia, some individuals were buried in stone or wooden sarcophagi, and a few sarcophagi contained couples buried together. The earliest chamber tombs appeared during the late 9th century BCE.

== Genetics ==
A genetic study published in Science in November 2019 examined the remains of a female from the Villanovan culture buried in Veio Grotta Gramiccia, Italy between ca. 900 BCE and 800 BCE. She carried the maternal haplogroup K1a4, found all over Europe since Neolithic times, and her autosomal DNA was a mixture of 72.9% Copper Age ancestry (EEF + WHG) and 27.1% Steppe-related ancestry. There was evidence for consanguinity for this sample with another ancient sample (700 BCE - 600 BCE) from the Etruscan necropolis of La Mattonara near Civitavecchia, compatible with the latter being an offspring of third-degree relatives of the former.

== Gallery ==
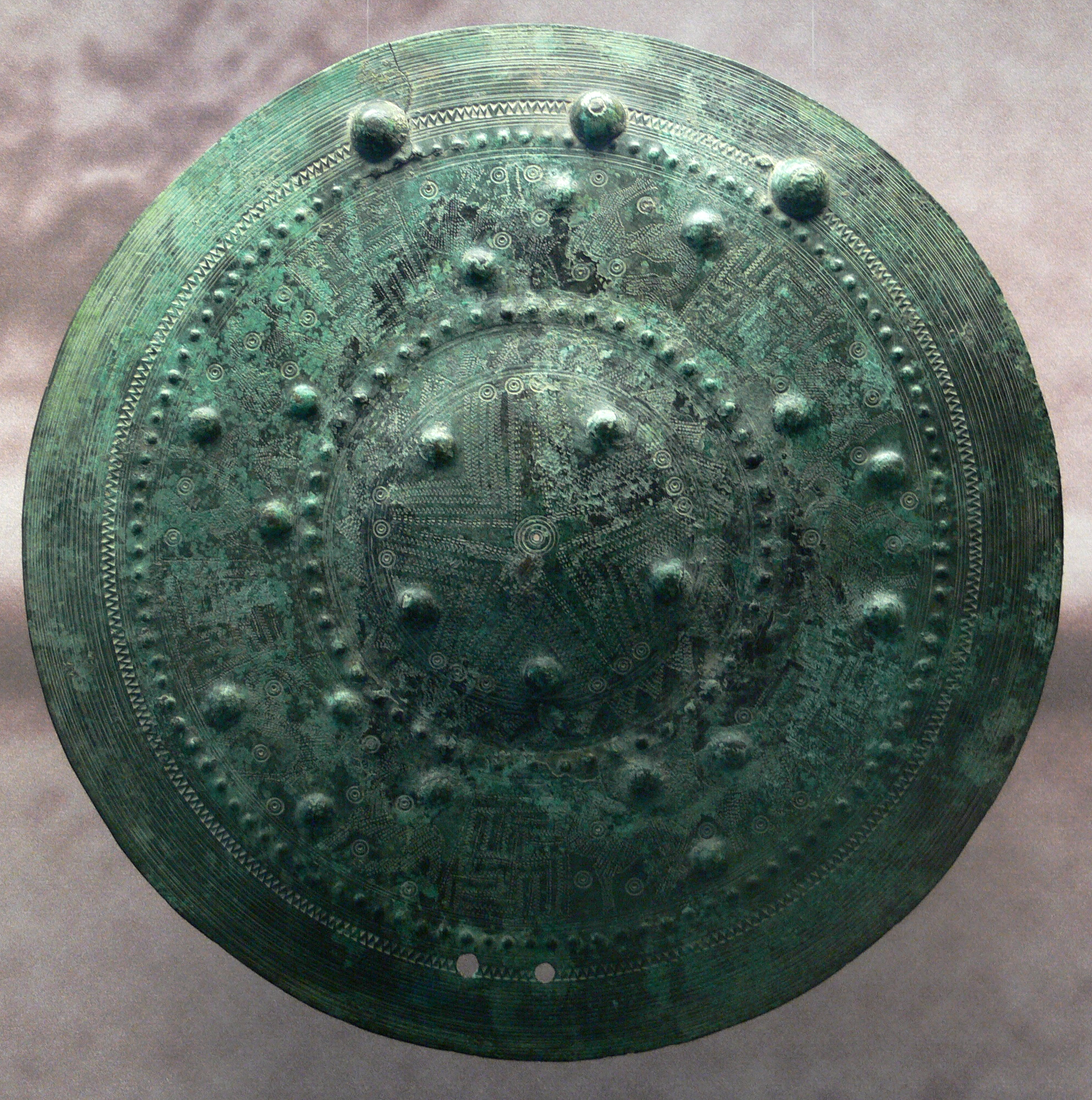
Decorative disk (chest guard), bronze, Italy, 8th century BC. Schaffhausen, Museum zu Allerheiligen, Ebnöther Collection (Department “Warriors/Weapons”).

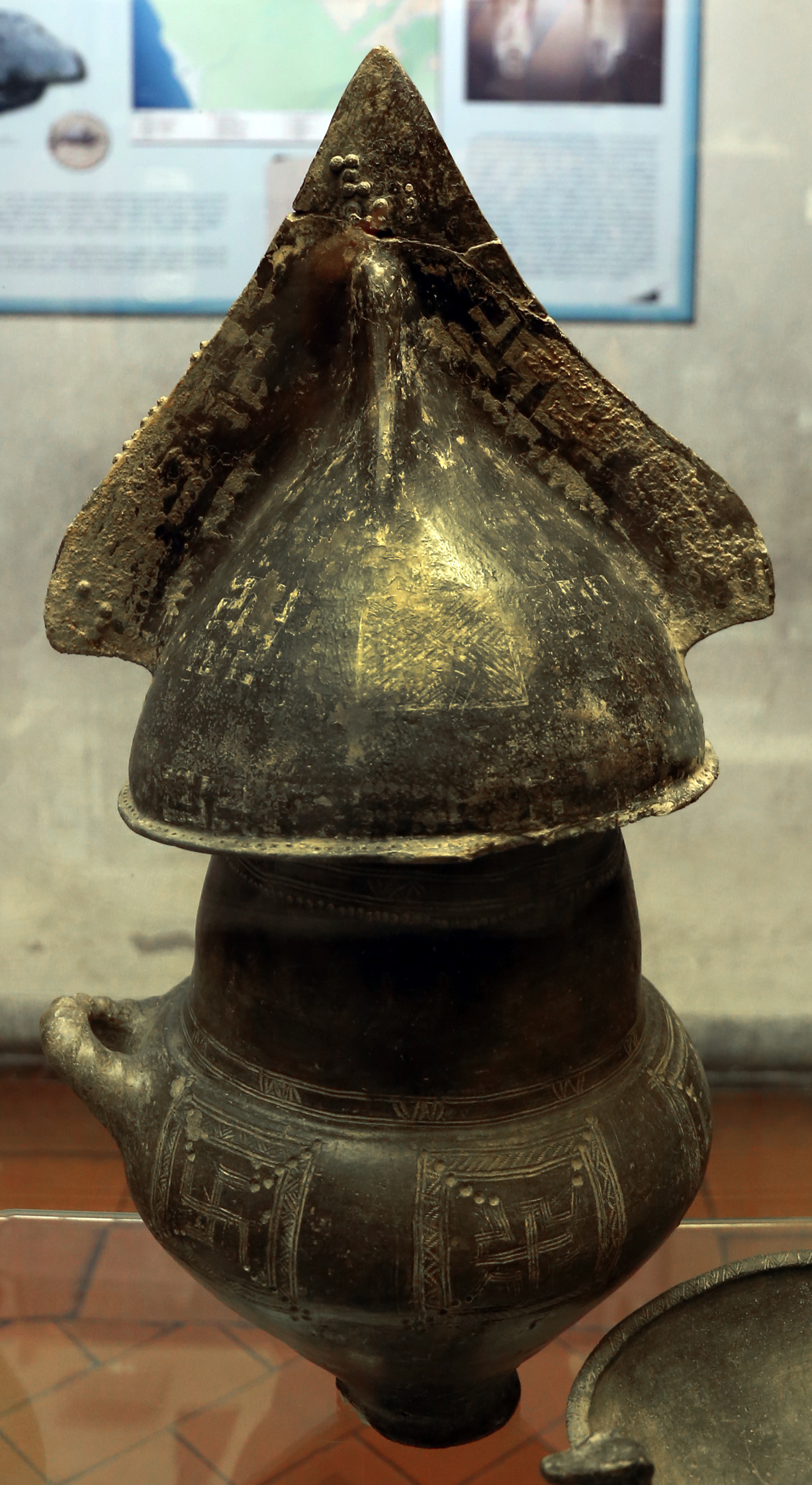
Biconical cinerary urn with helmet-shaped lid, 9th-8th century BC. BC, from Monterozzi (Fontanaccia), Tarquinia, Museo archeologico nazionale.

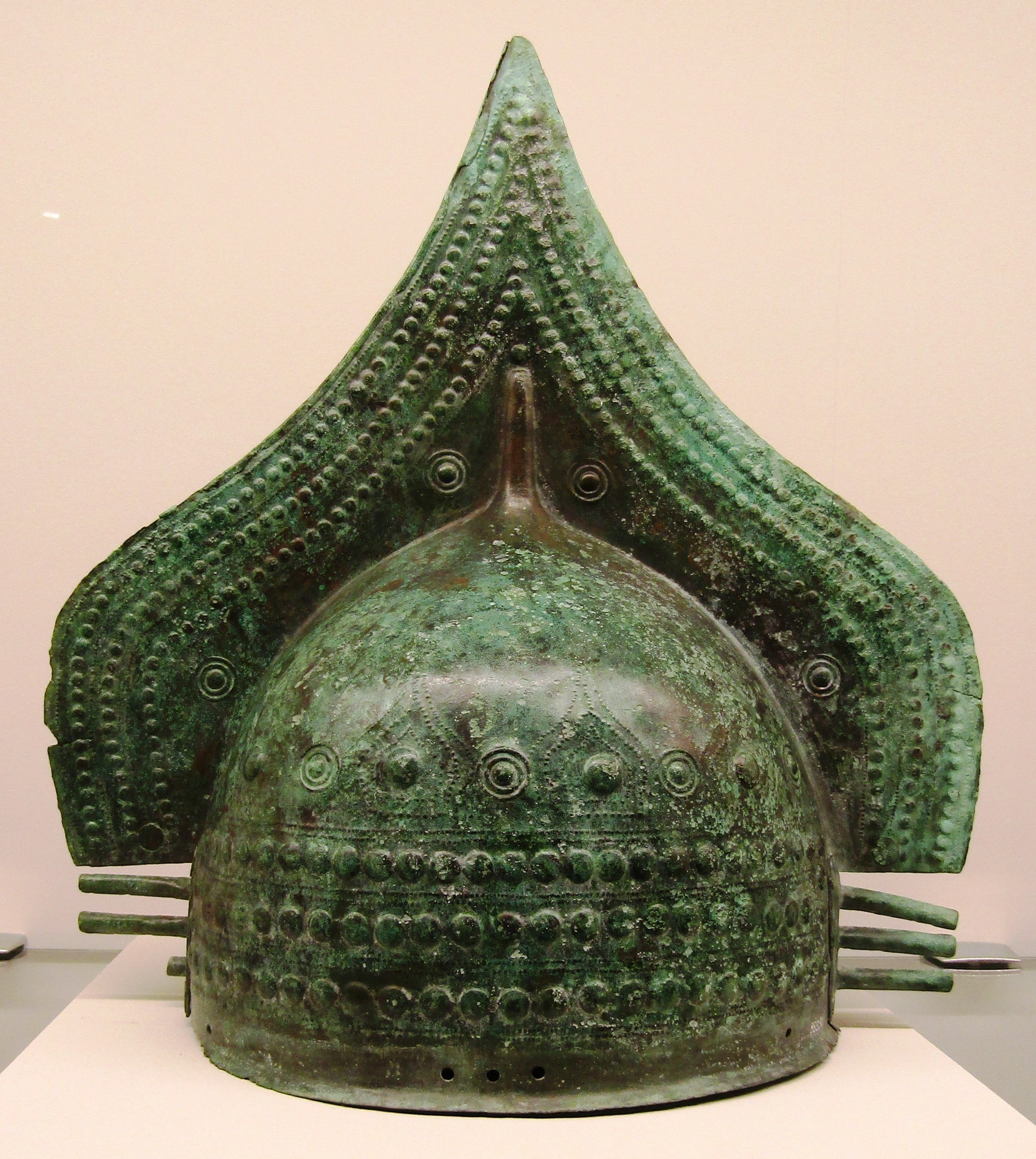
Etruscan crested bronze helmet from Visentium (Bisenzio), necropolis of Bucacce, tomb 1. Mid-8th century. National Archaeological Museum of Florence, inv. 85531.

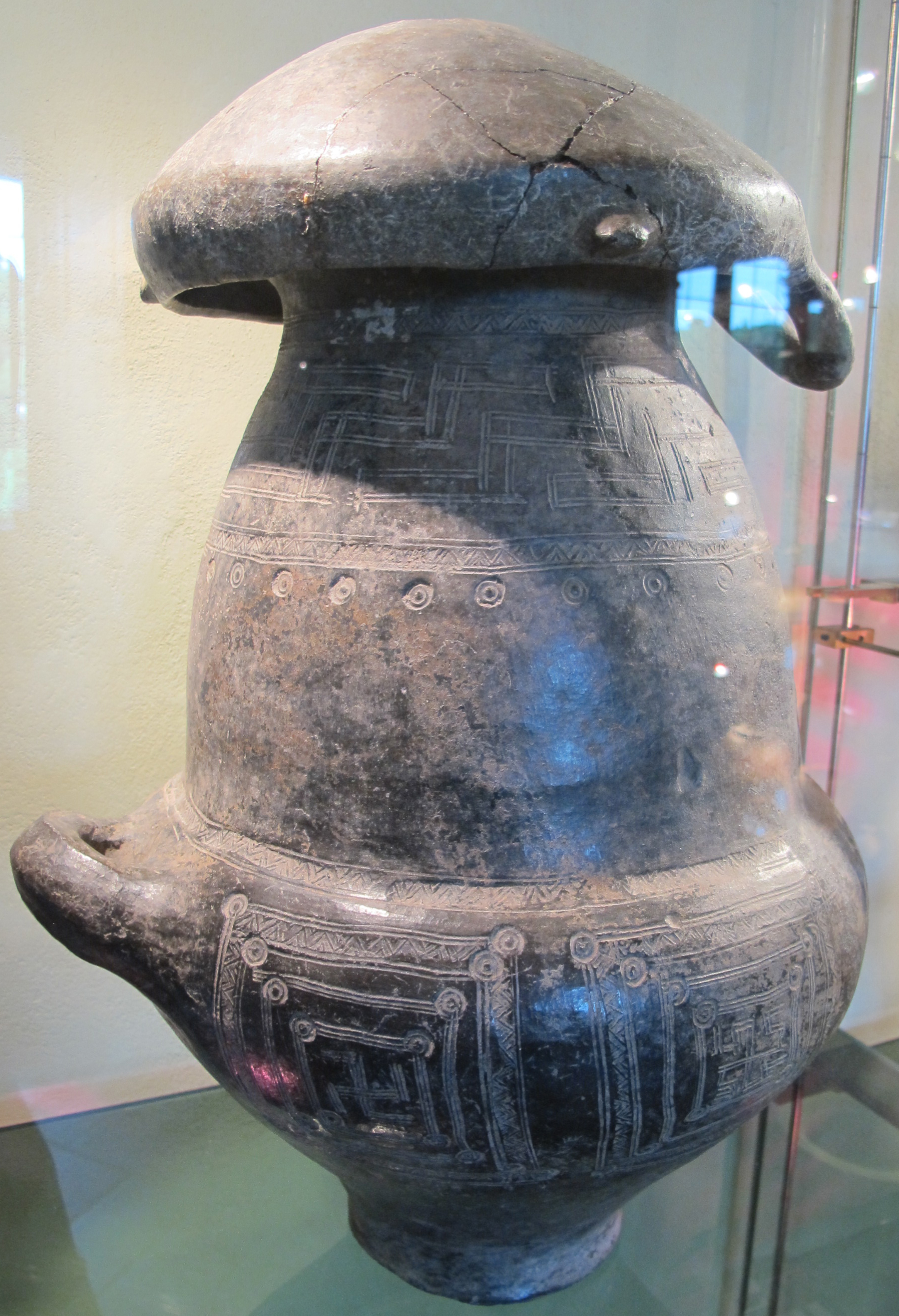
Villanovan biconical cinerary urn with impasto ceramic lid, -850/-800. National Archaeological Museum G.C.Mecenate - MIBAC.

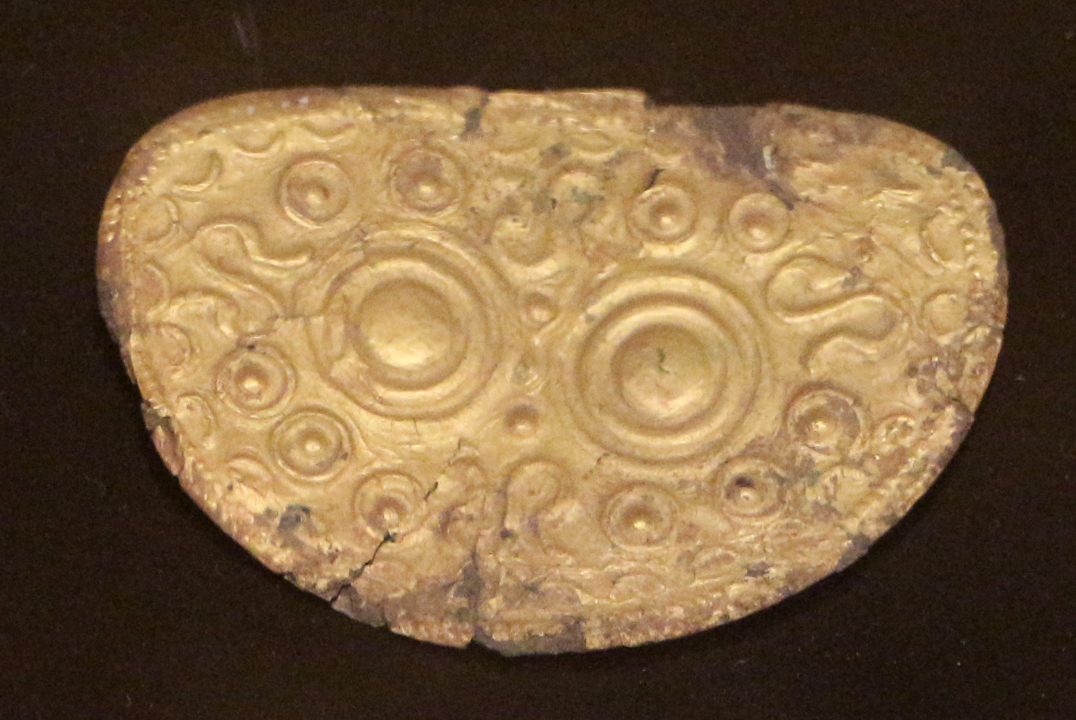
Gold plates covering fibulae, Guerruccia necropolis, tomb S1, 730-700 BC. Guarnacci Museum.

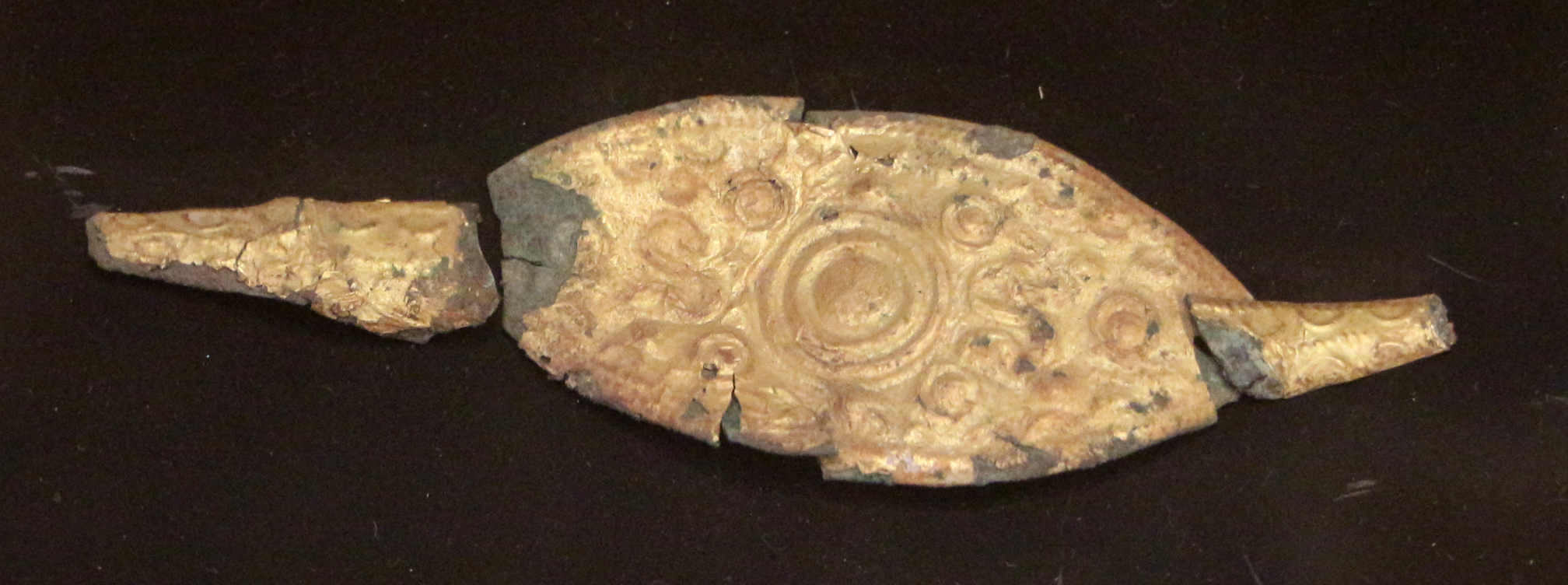
Gold plates covering fibulae, Guerruccia necropolis, tomb S1, 730-700 BC. Guarnacci Museum.

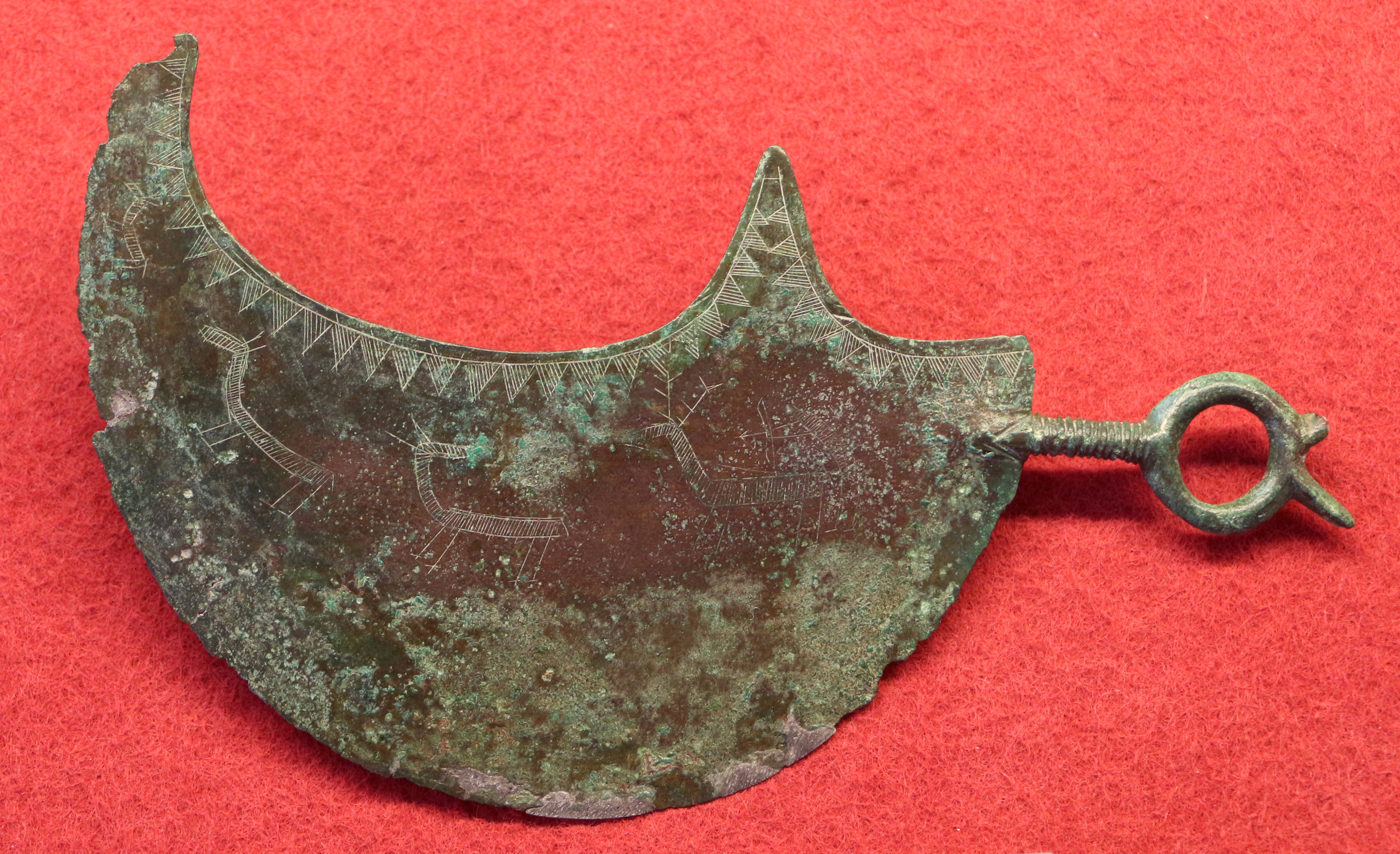
Lunar razor with engraved hunting scene, -9th-8th century, from the Villanovan necropolis of Vetulonia. Museo archeologico et d’arte della Maremma.

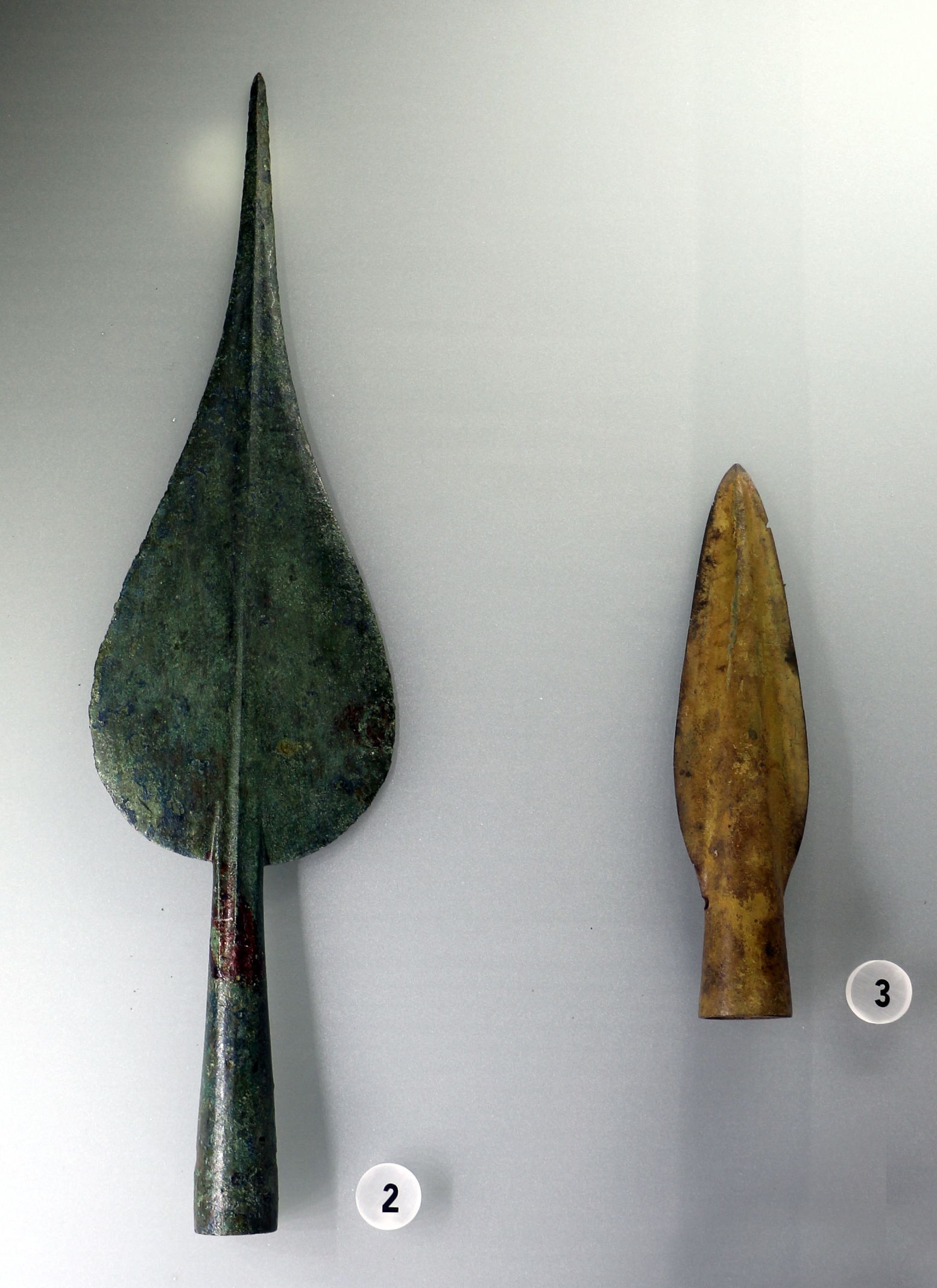
Bronze spear and javelin tip, 9th-8th century BC, from the necropolis of Colfiorito, Foligno.

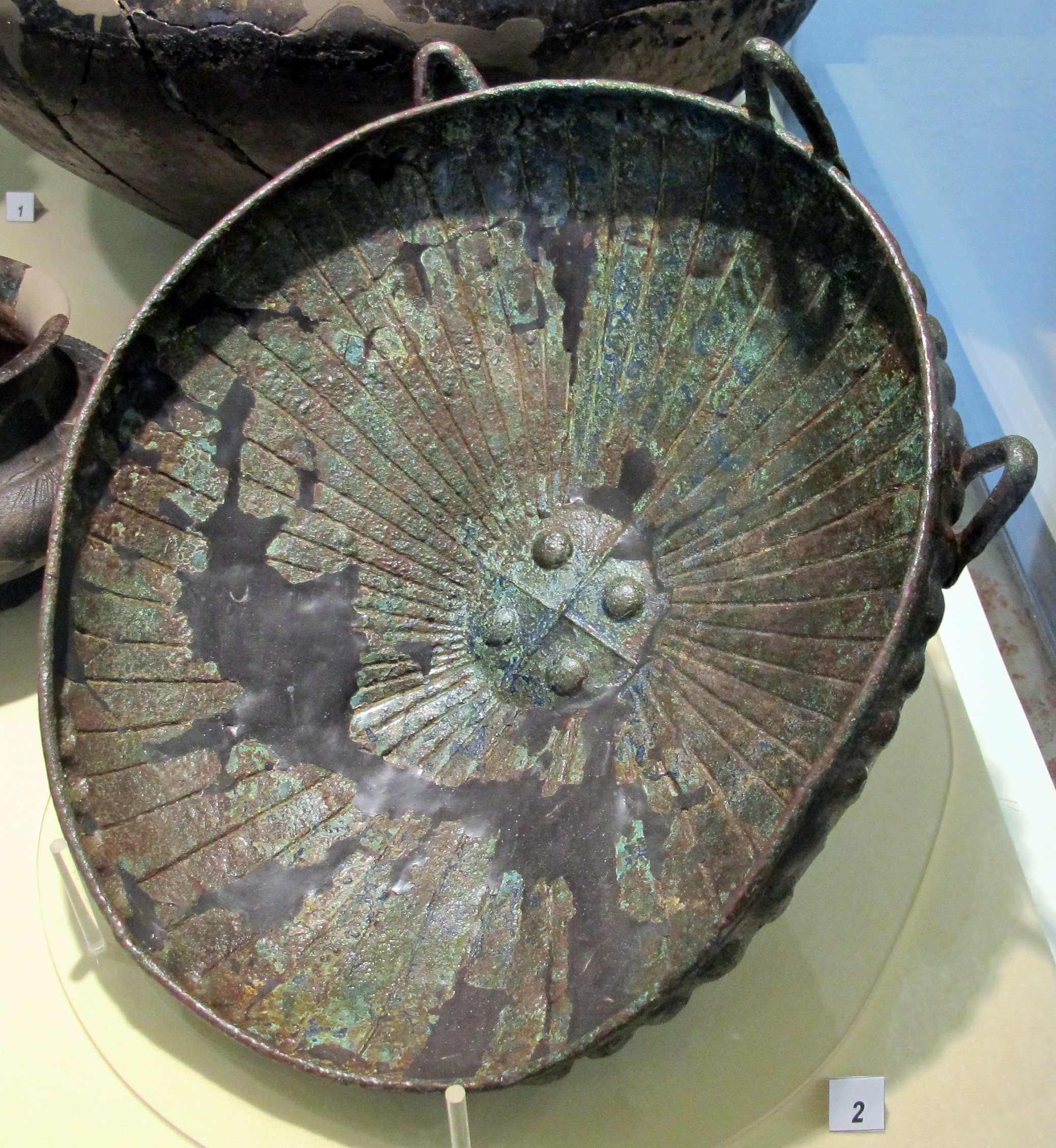
Ribbed bronze plaque cup from the Fairground burial site, grave 154, Villanovan III, 750-700 BC.

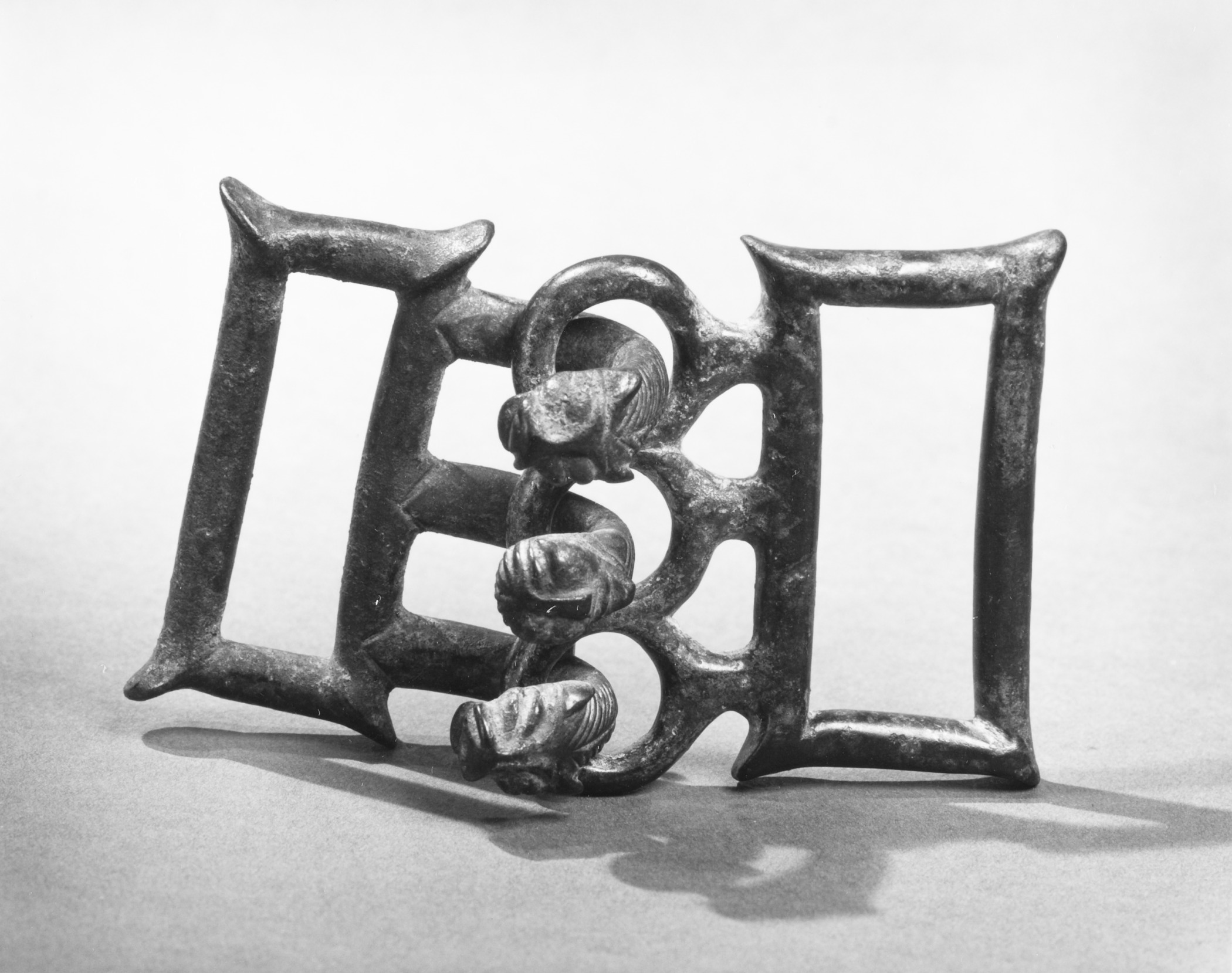
Three-prong clasp and buckle. LACMA M.76.97.873a-b.

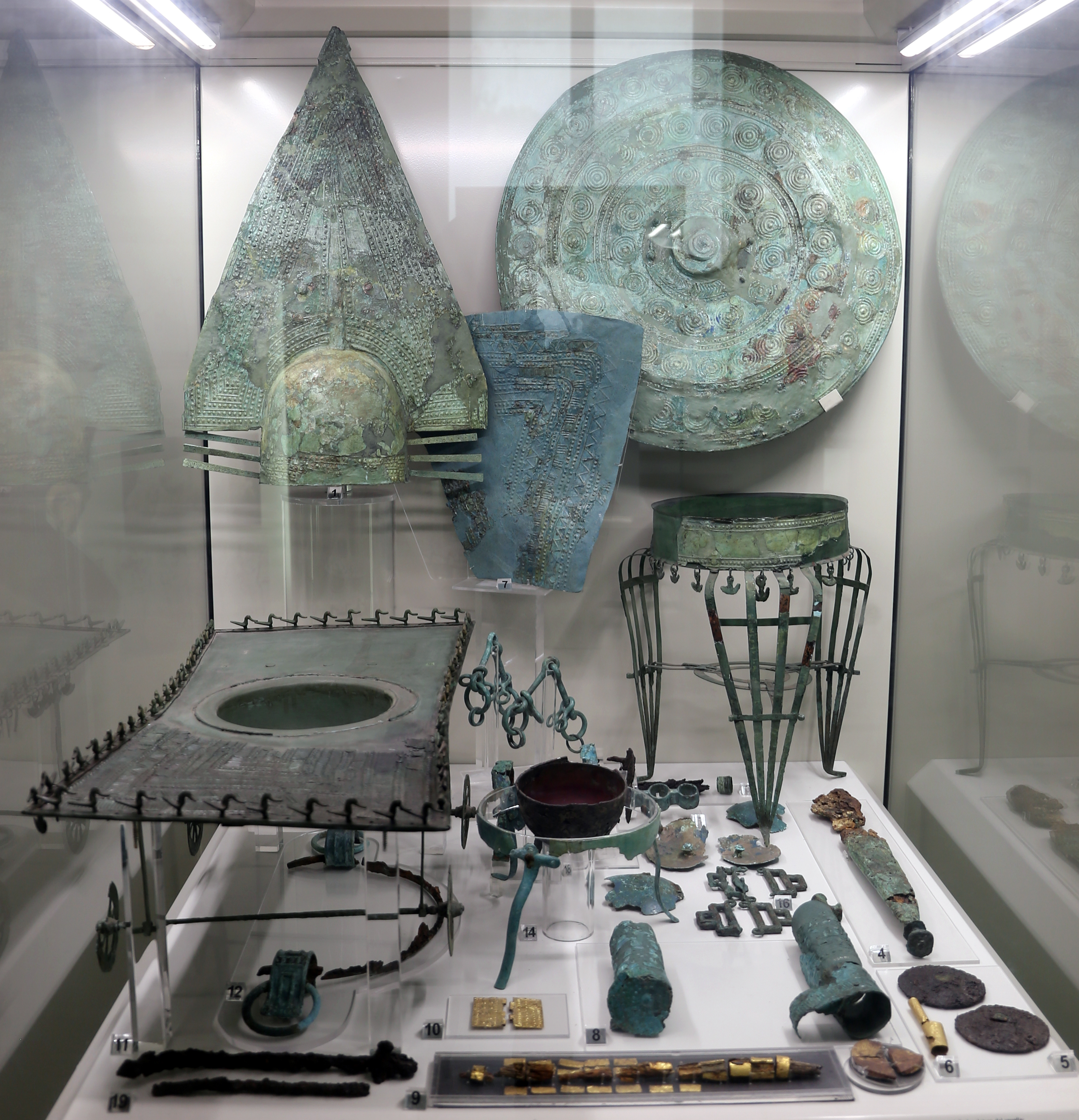
Funerary furniture from male tomb 871 of the necropolis of Casal del Fosso, circa 730-720 BC

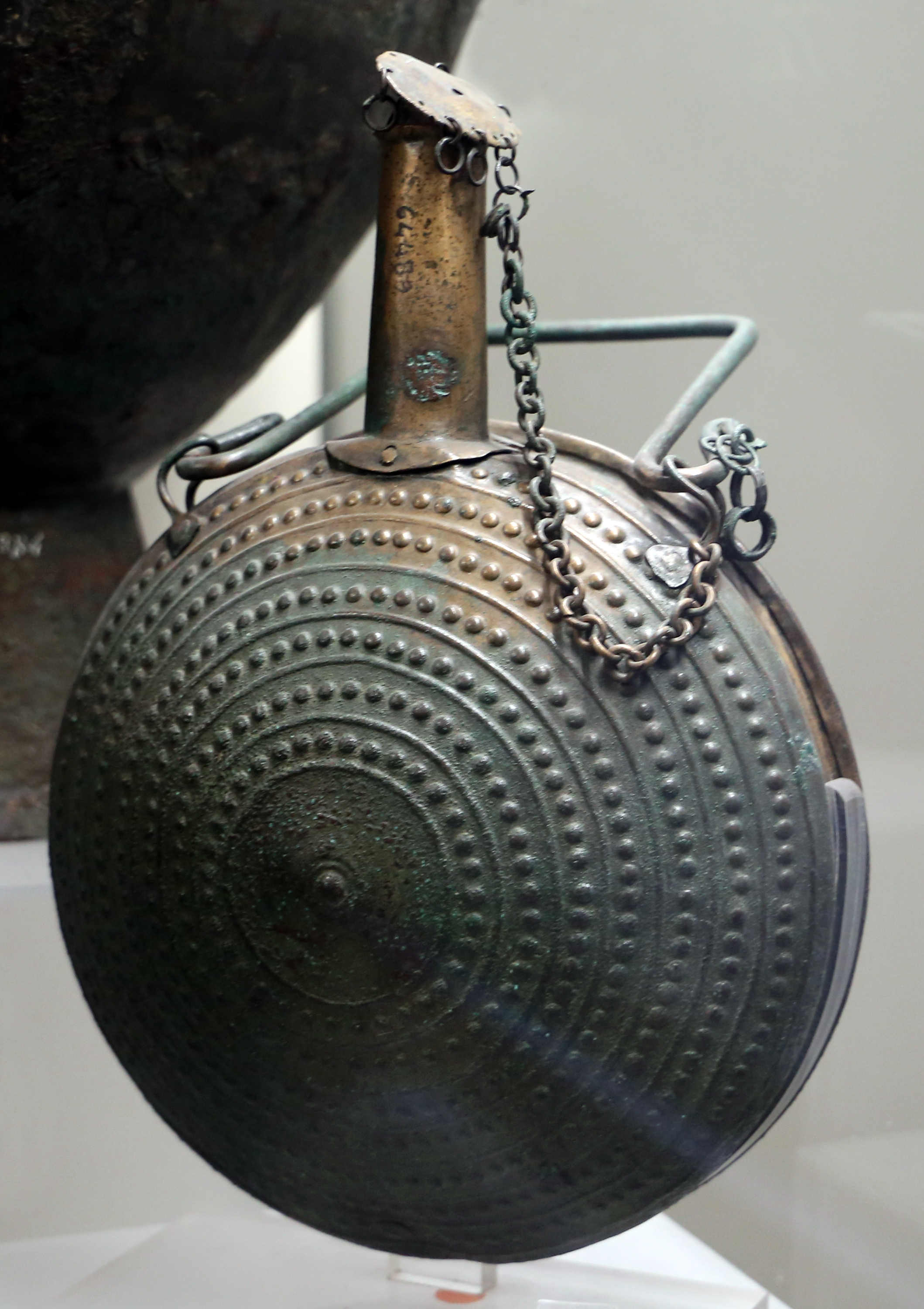
Imported pilgrim's flask, 725-700 BC.

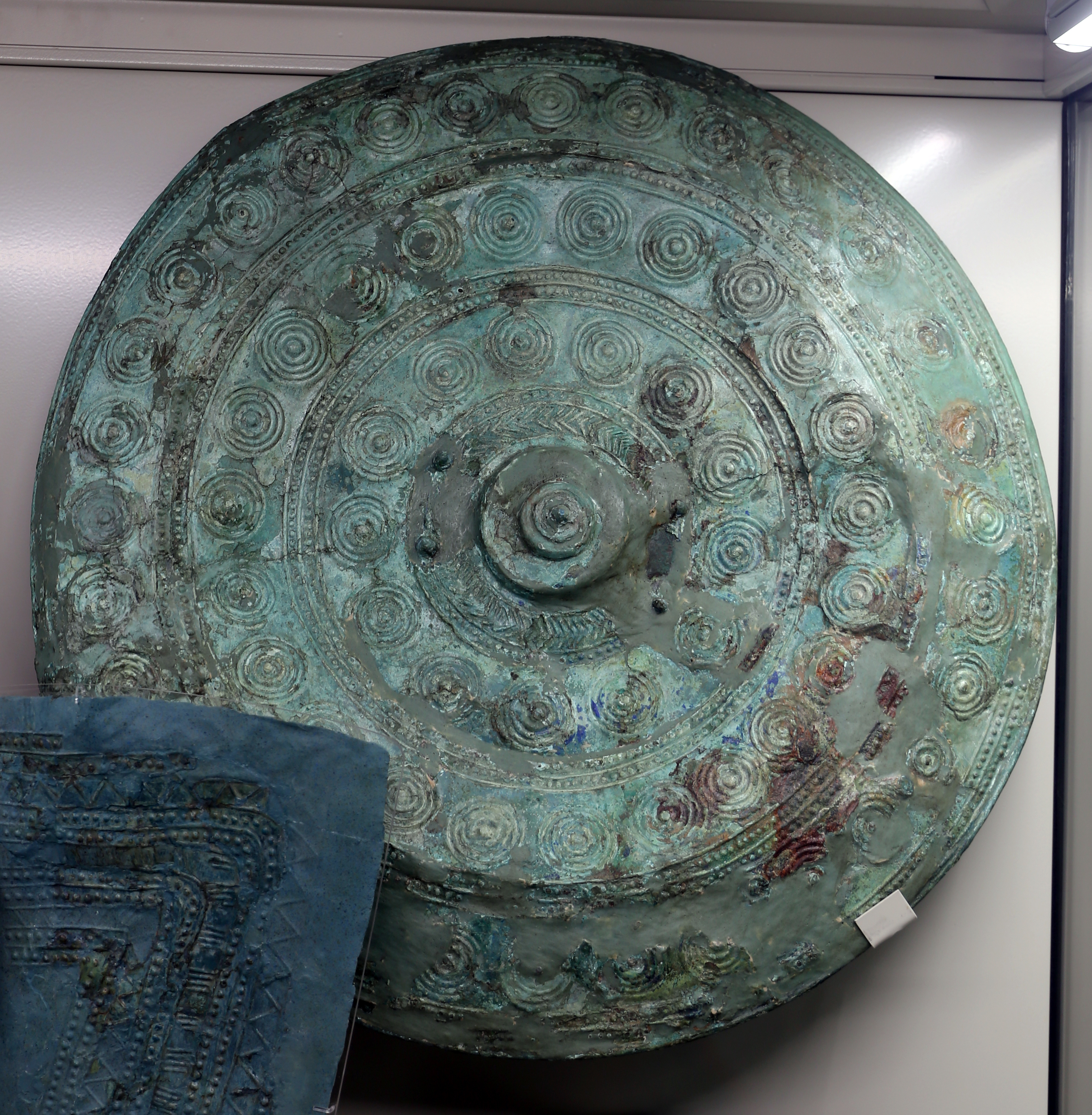
Funerary furniture from male tomb 871 of the necropolis of Casal del Fosso, circa 730-720 BC. Circular bronze parade shield decorated with rows of raised dots.

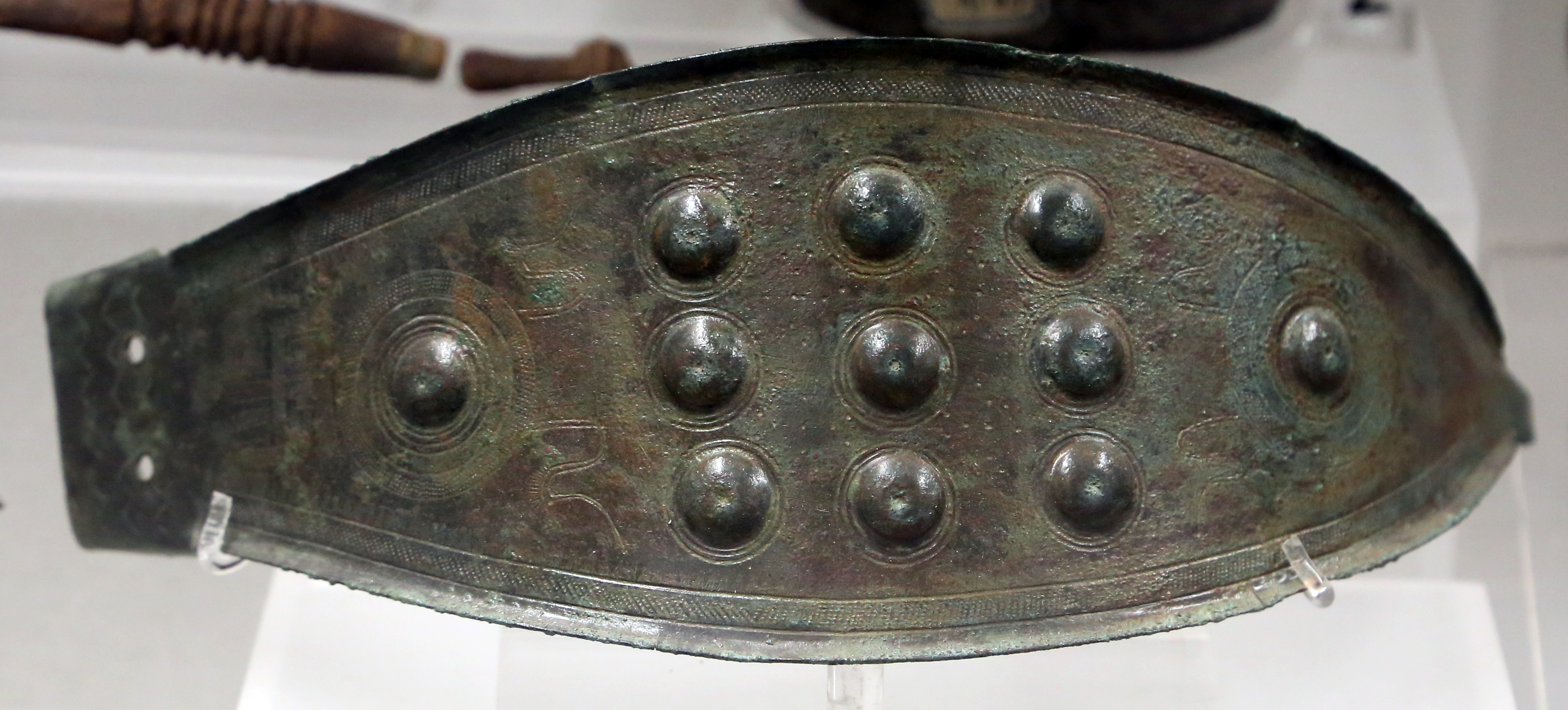
Belt buckle, circa 800-750 BC.

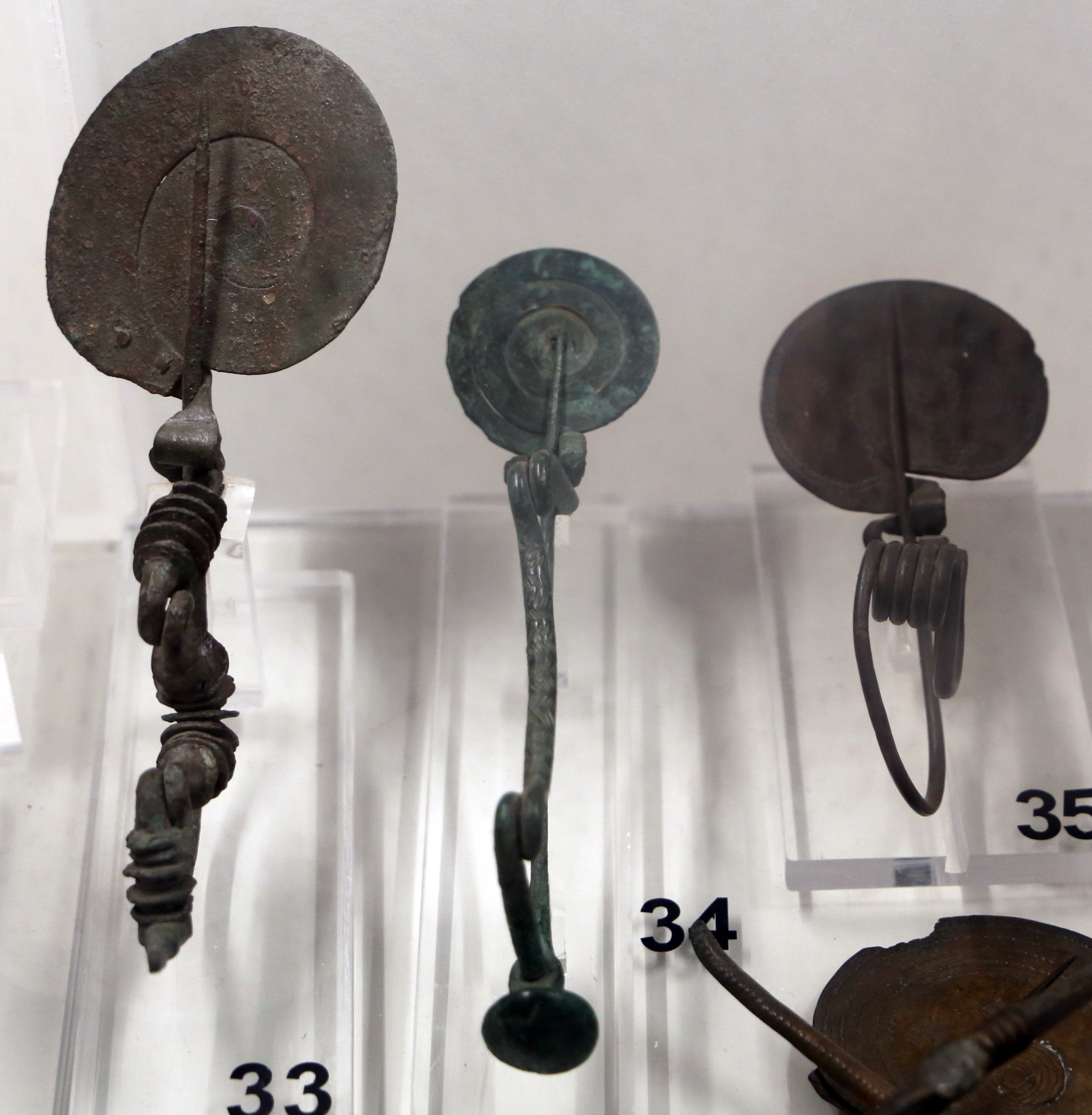
Serpentine brooches with stirrup, 900-850 BC.

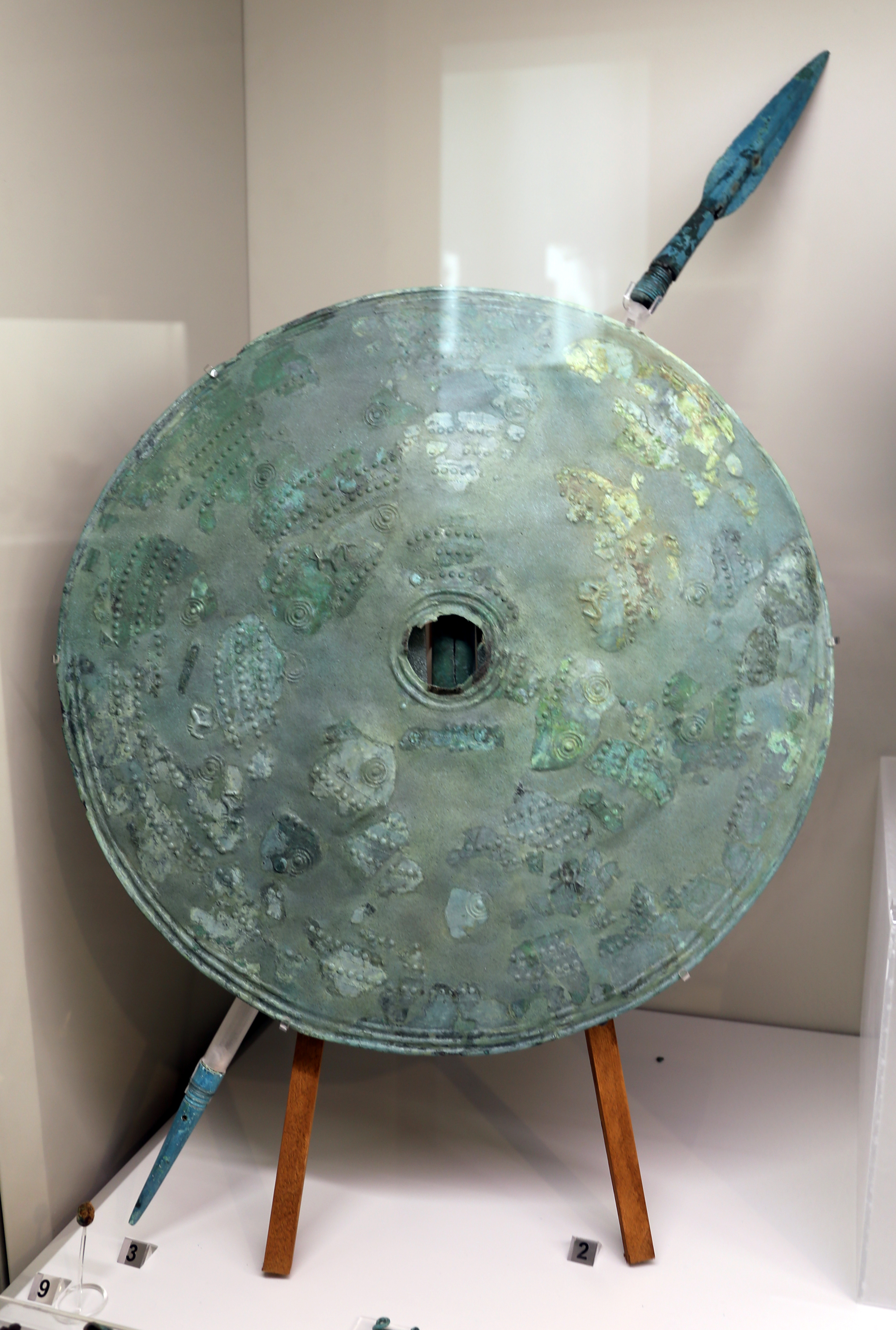
Round shield decorated with concentric bands in relief with horses and circles, bronze, Necropolis of the Four Fountains, shaft tomb AA1, 750 BC.

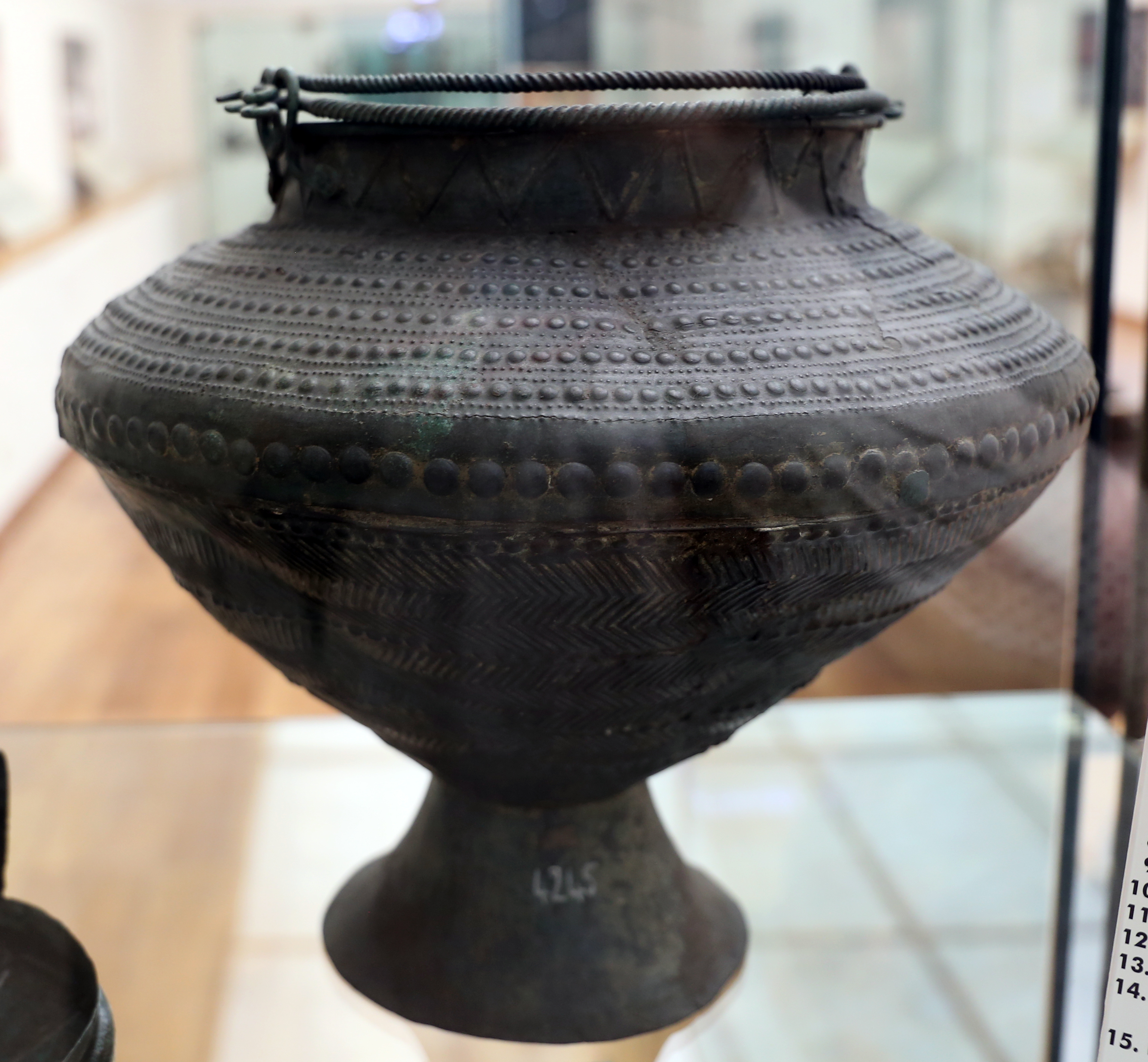
Bronze situla, Narce, Petrina necropolis, tomb 4, 730-720 BC.

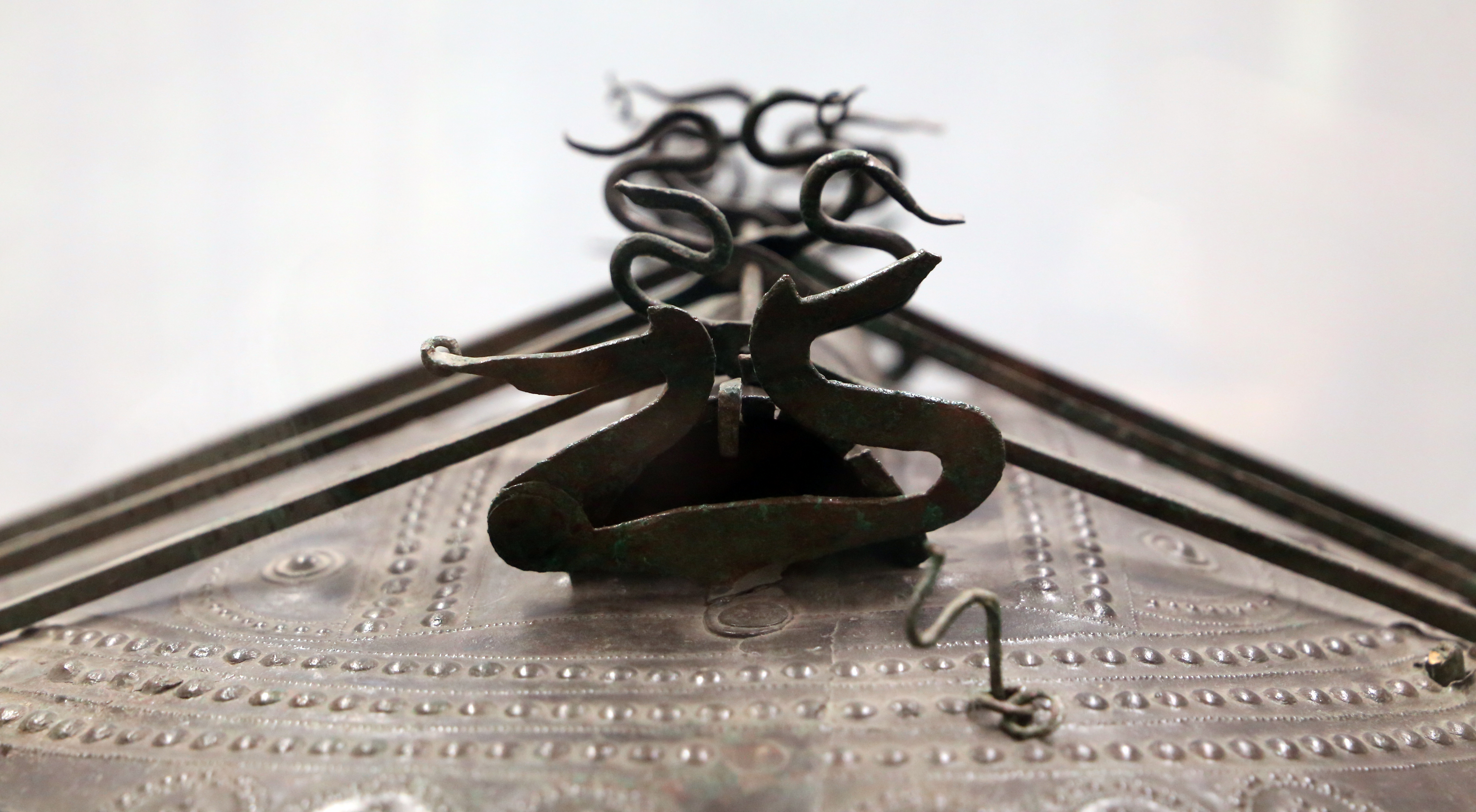
Bronze urn in the shape of a hut, from the Osteria necropolis, circa 800-750 BC.

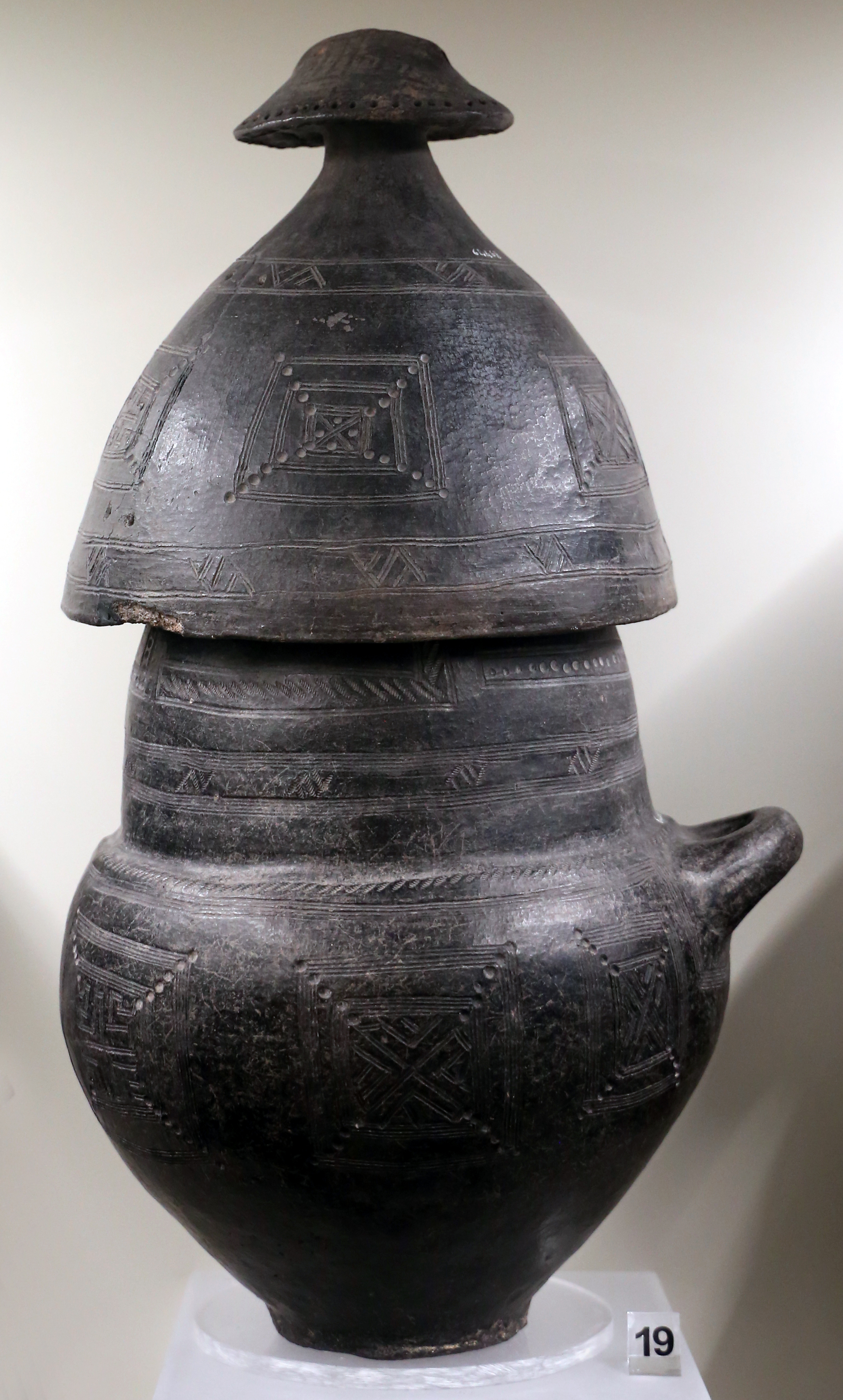
Biconical vase with helmet-shaped lid and hut-shaped top, from the Osteria Necropolis, 850-800 BC.

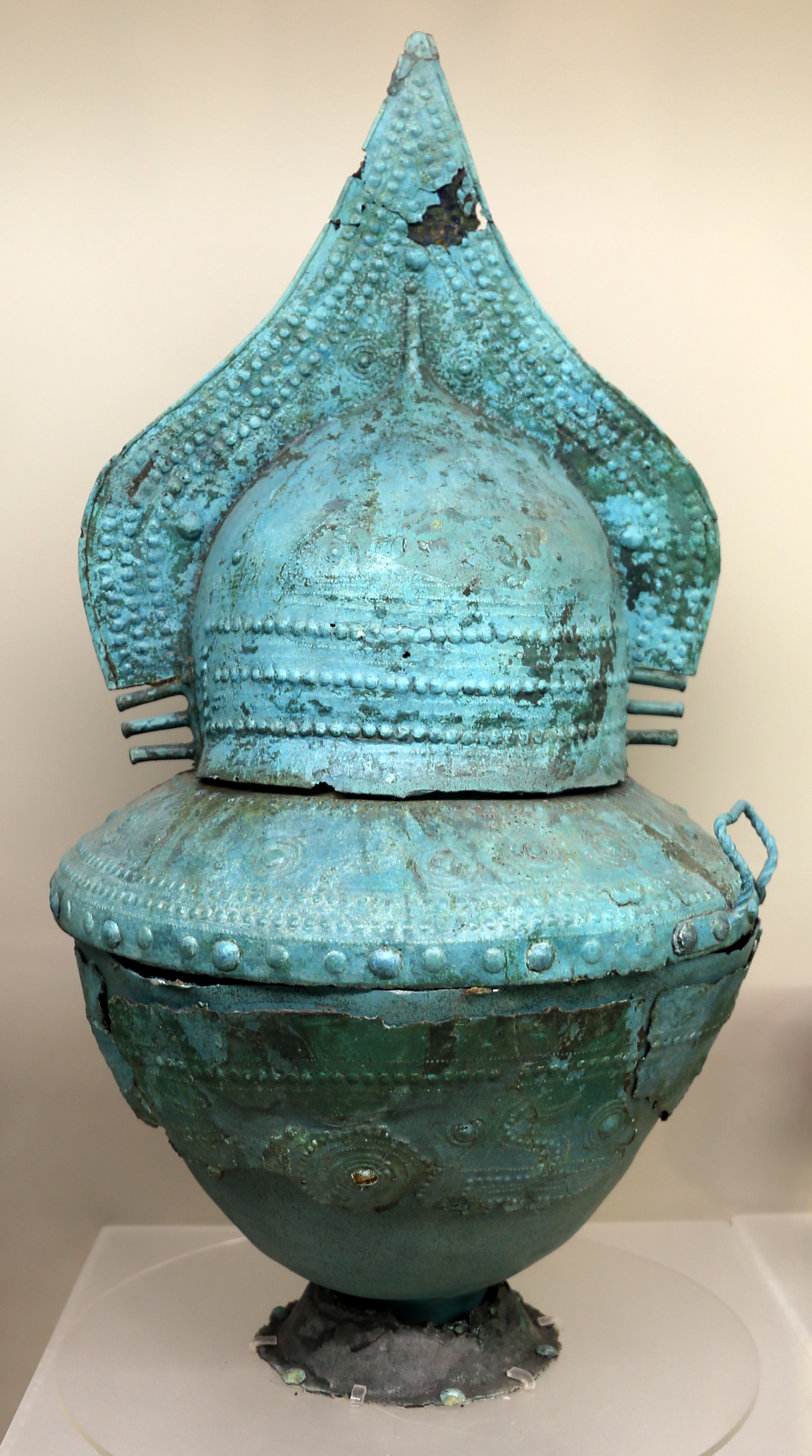
Cinerary vase with lid in the shape of a high-crested helmet, bronze, Necropolis of the Four Fountains, shaft tomb AA1, 750 BC.

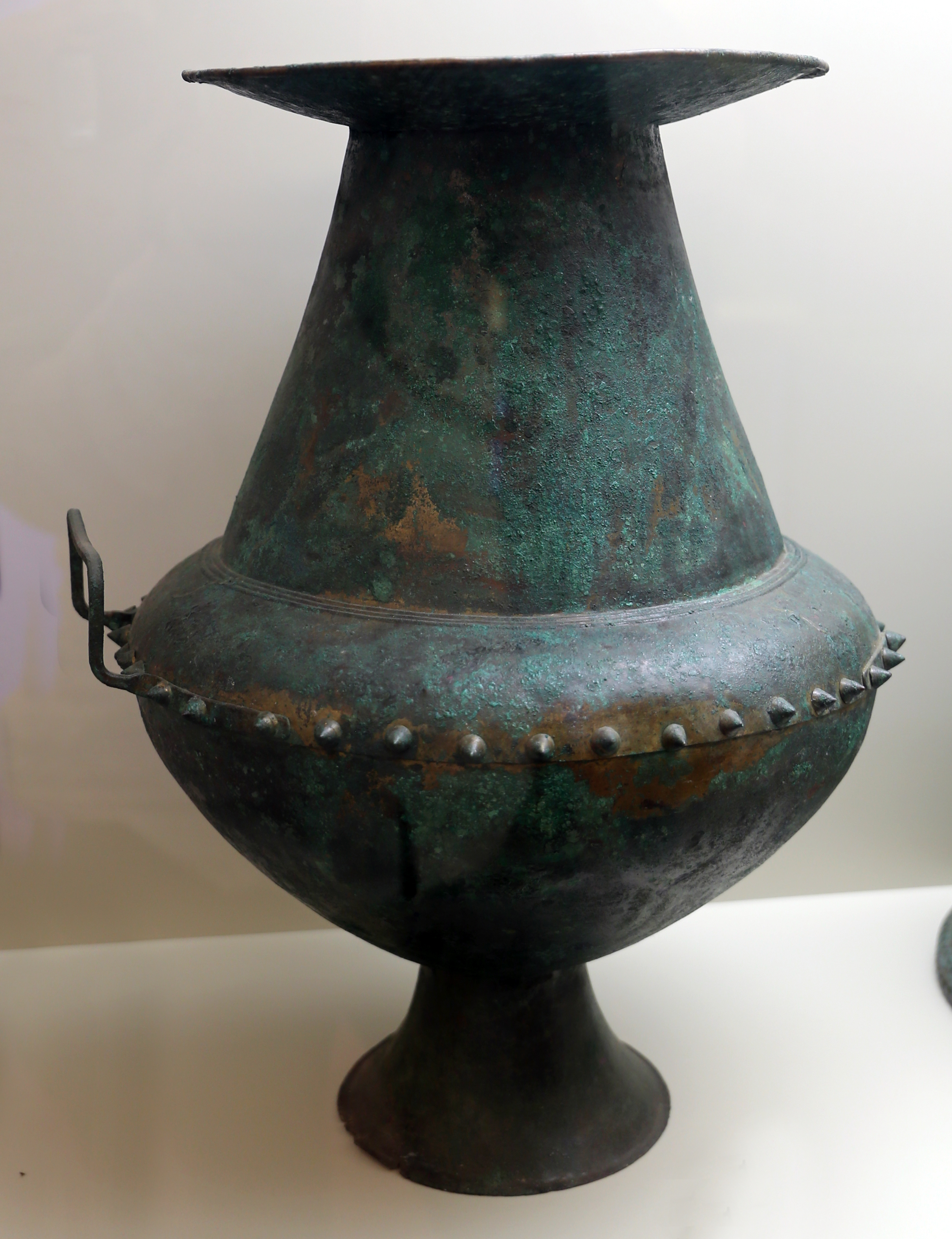
Biconical bronze vase, possibly from Vulci, 720-700 BC.

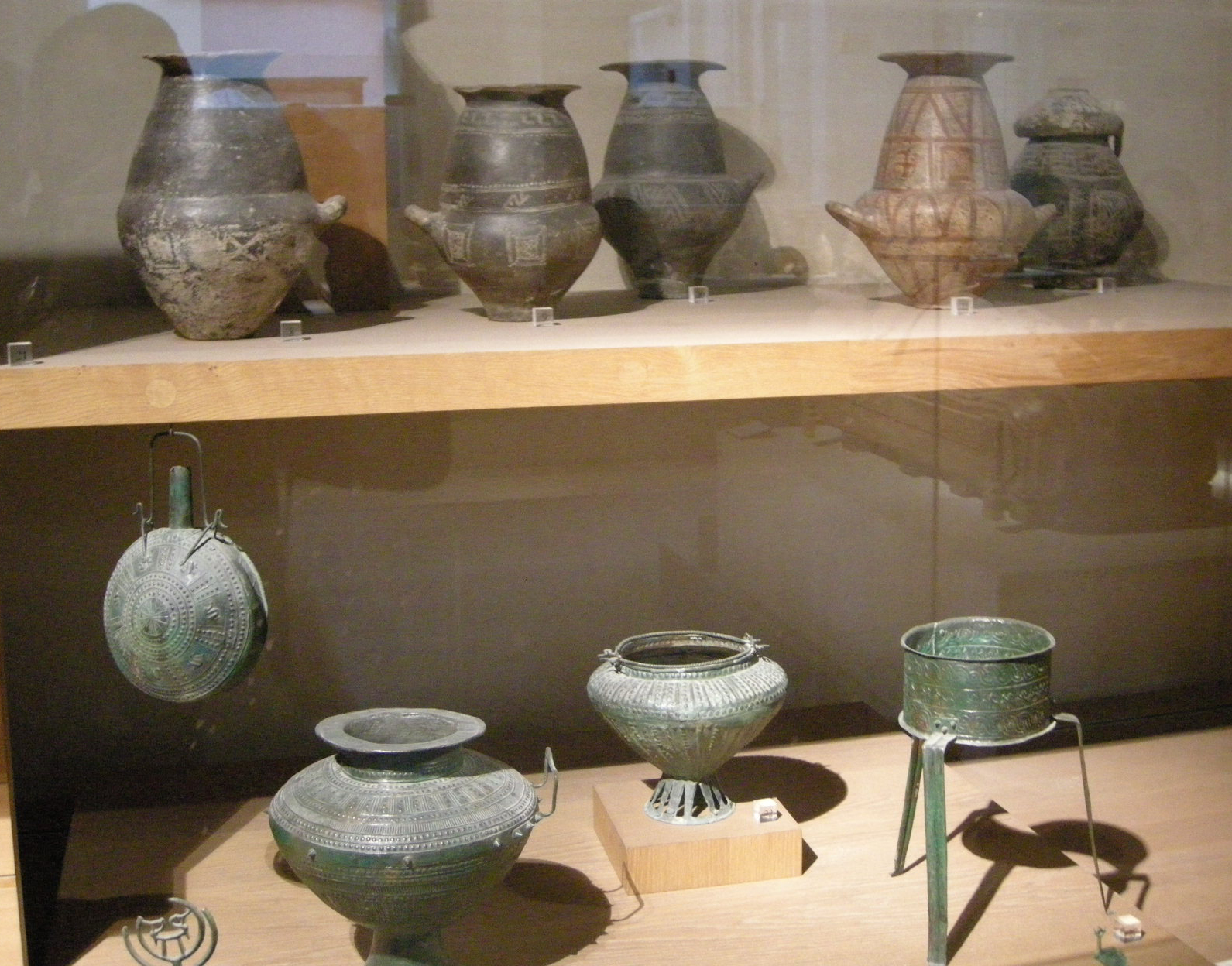
Louvre, Villanovan objects.

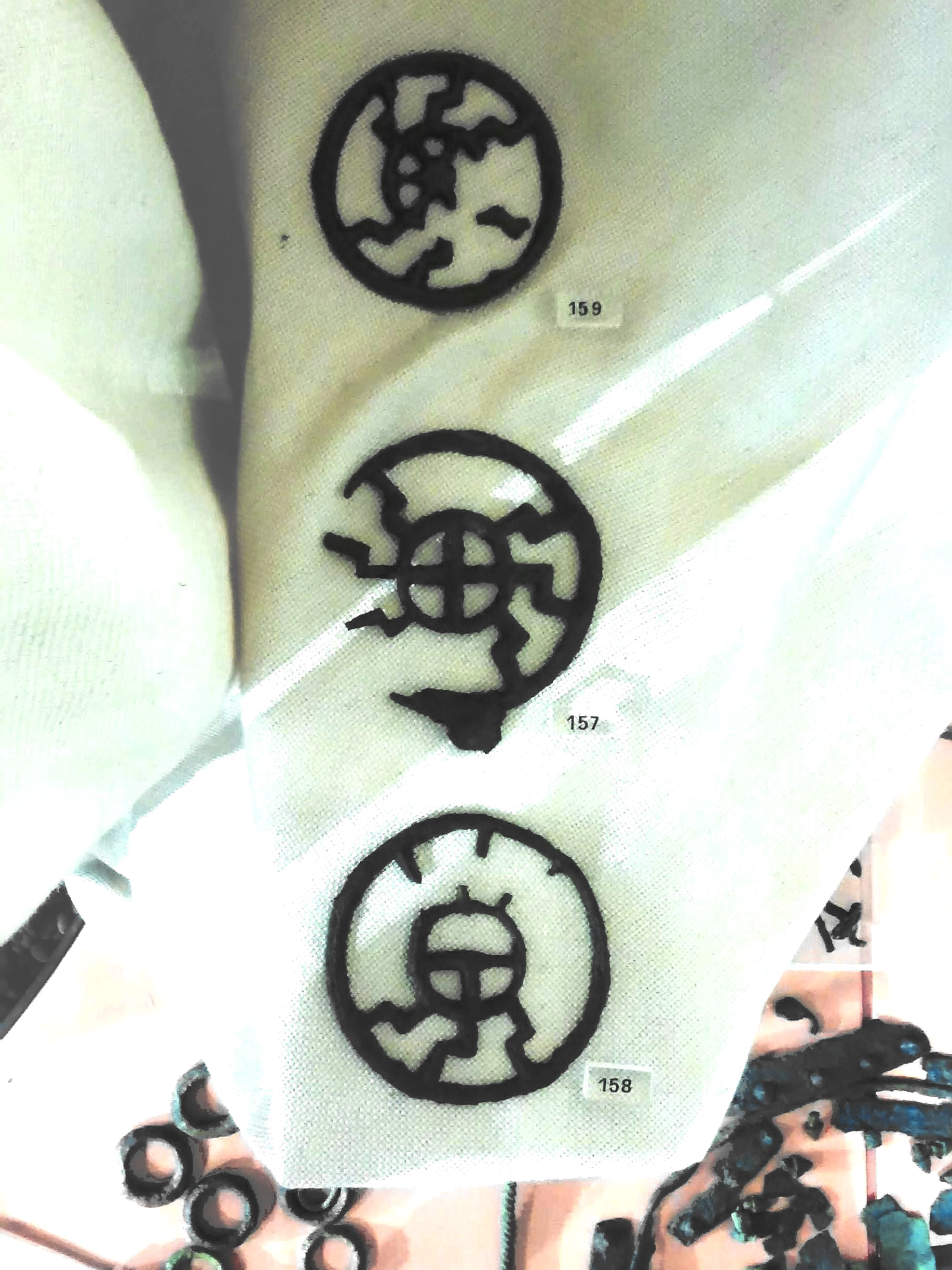
Villanovan woman's belt (Verucchio).

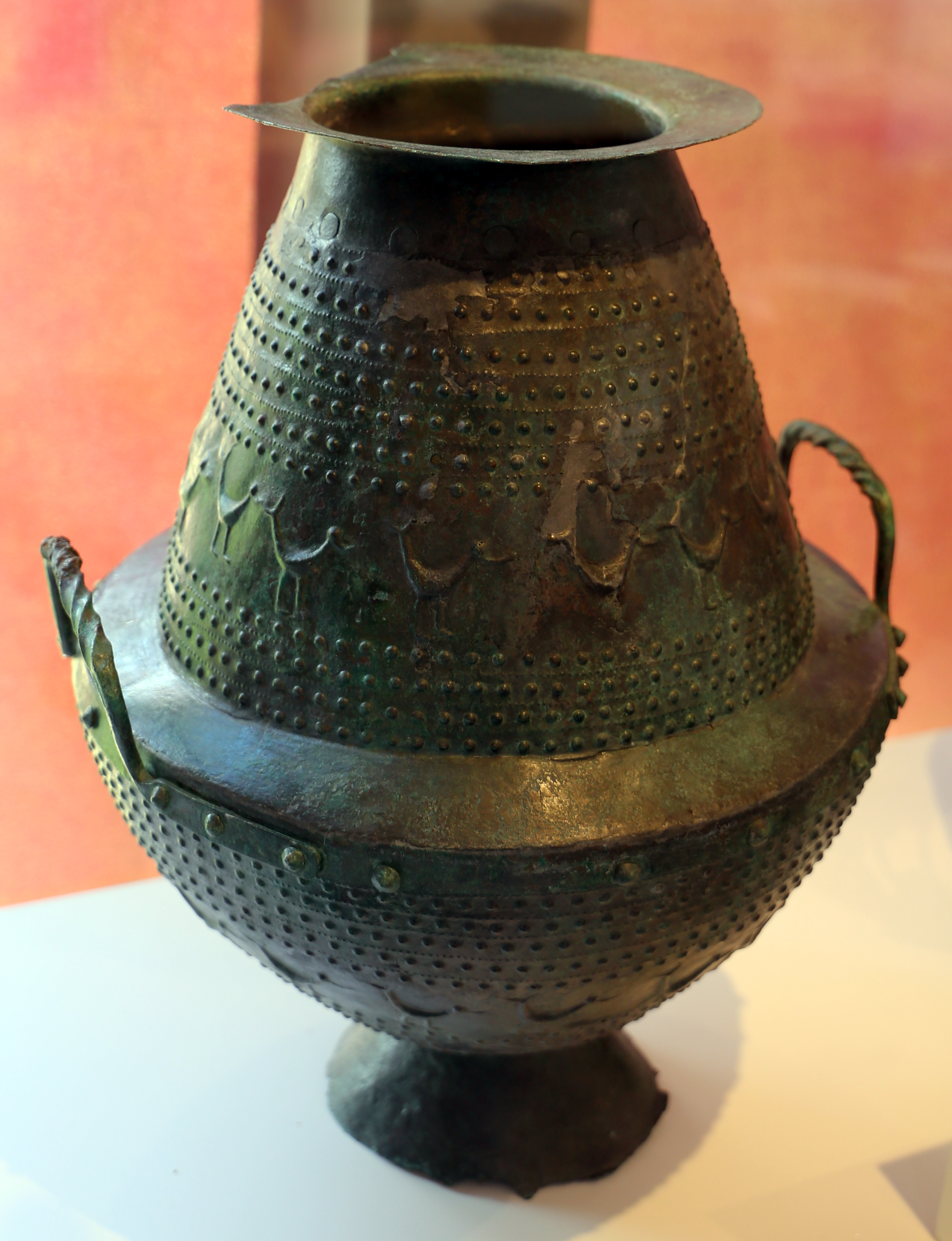
Villanovan bronze globular vase, originally for perfumes and incense, then as a cinerary, circa 750-725 BC, tomb 74 of Montevetrano.

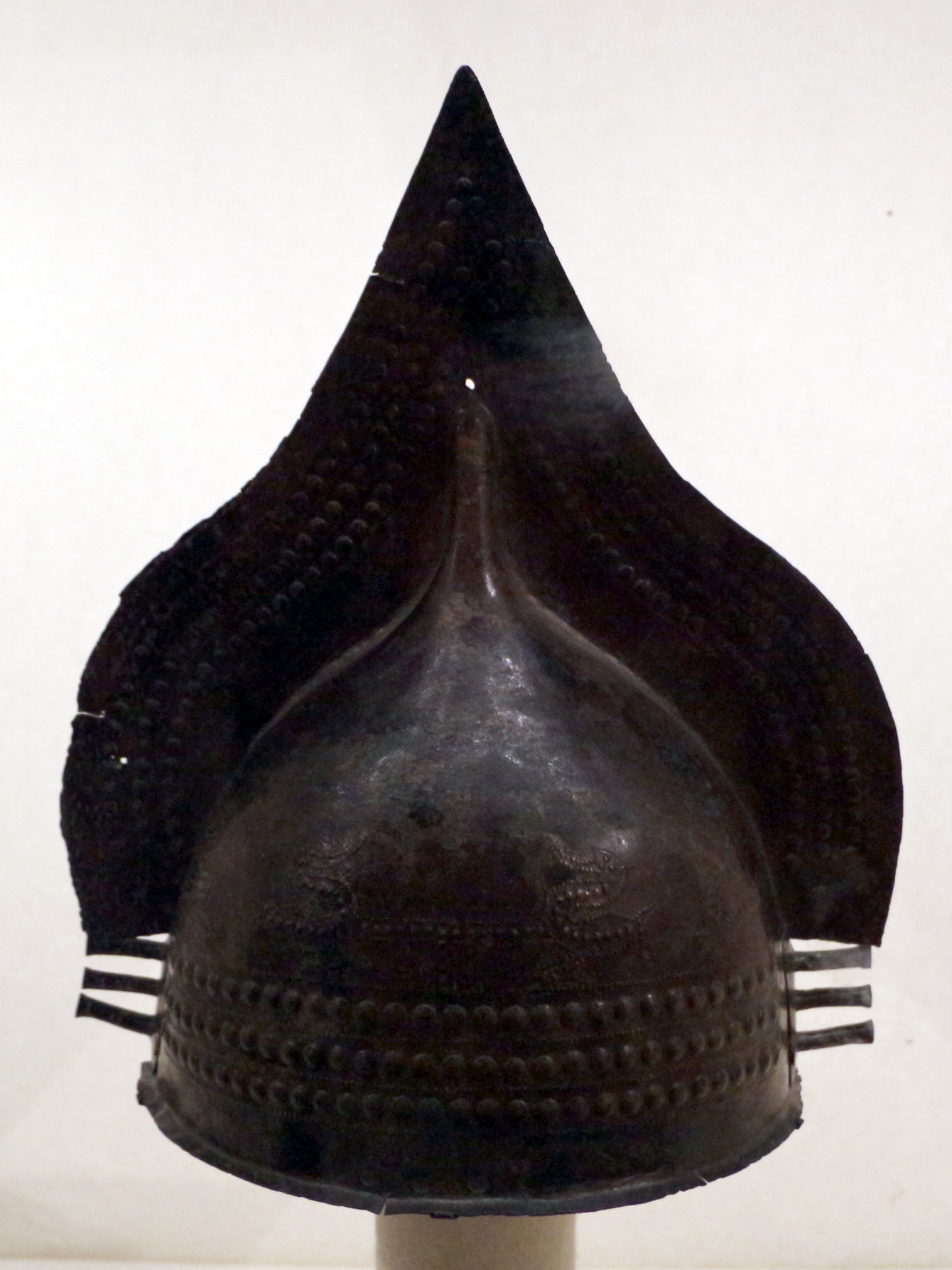
Crested helmet from the warrior's tomb at Poggio alle Croci.

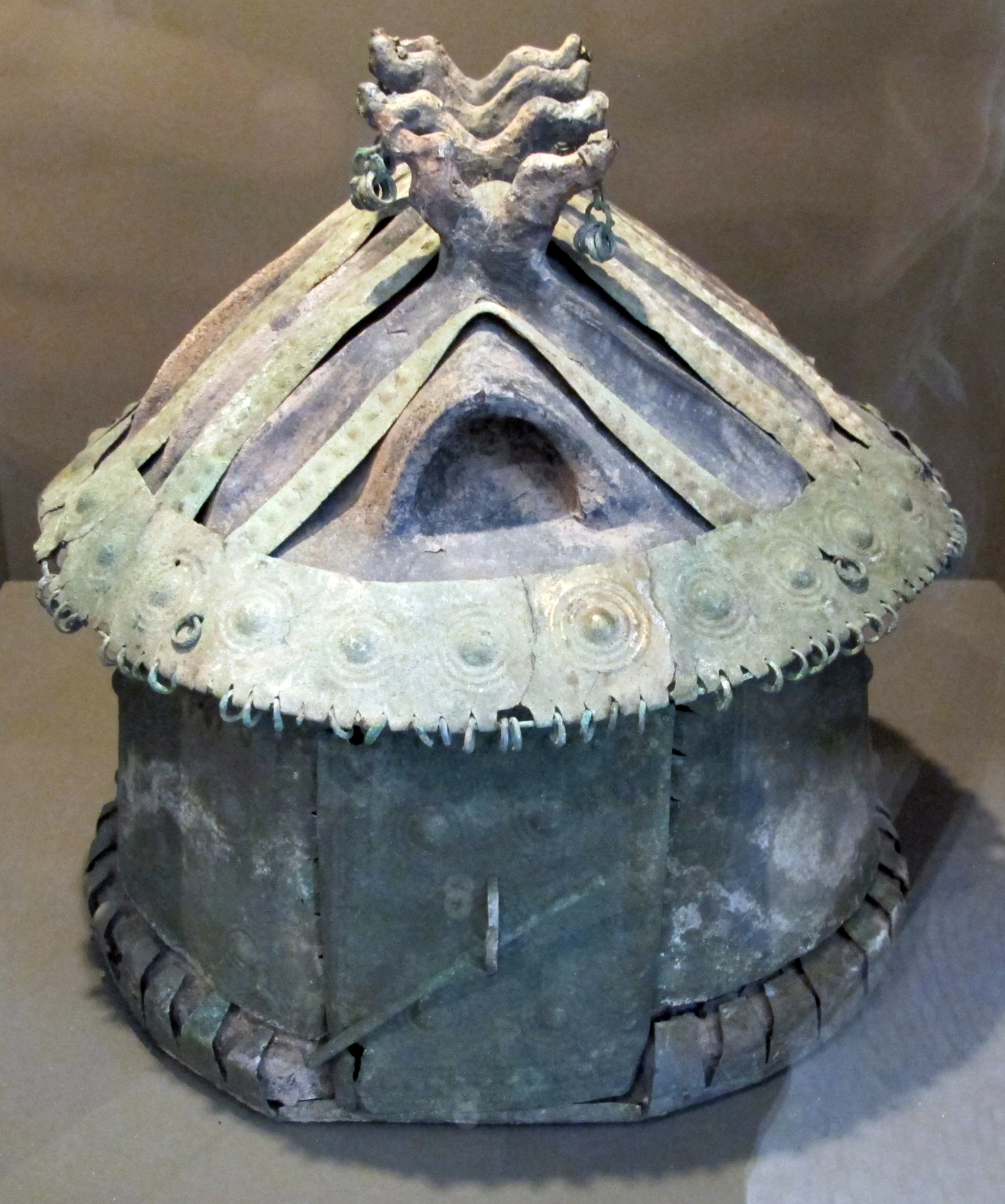
Vulci workshop, house-shaped cinerary urn, 8th century BC.

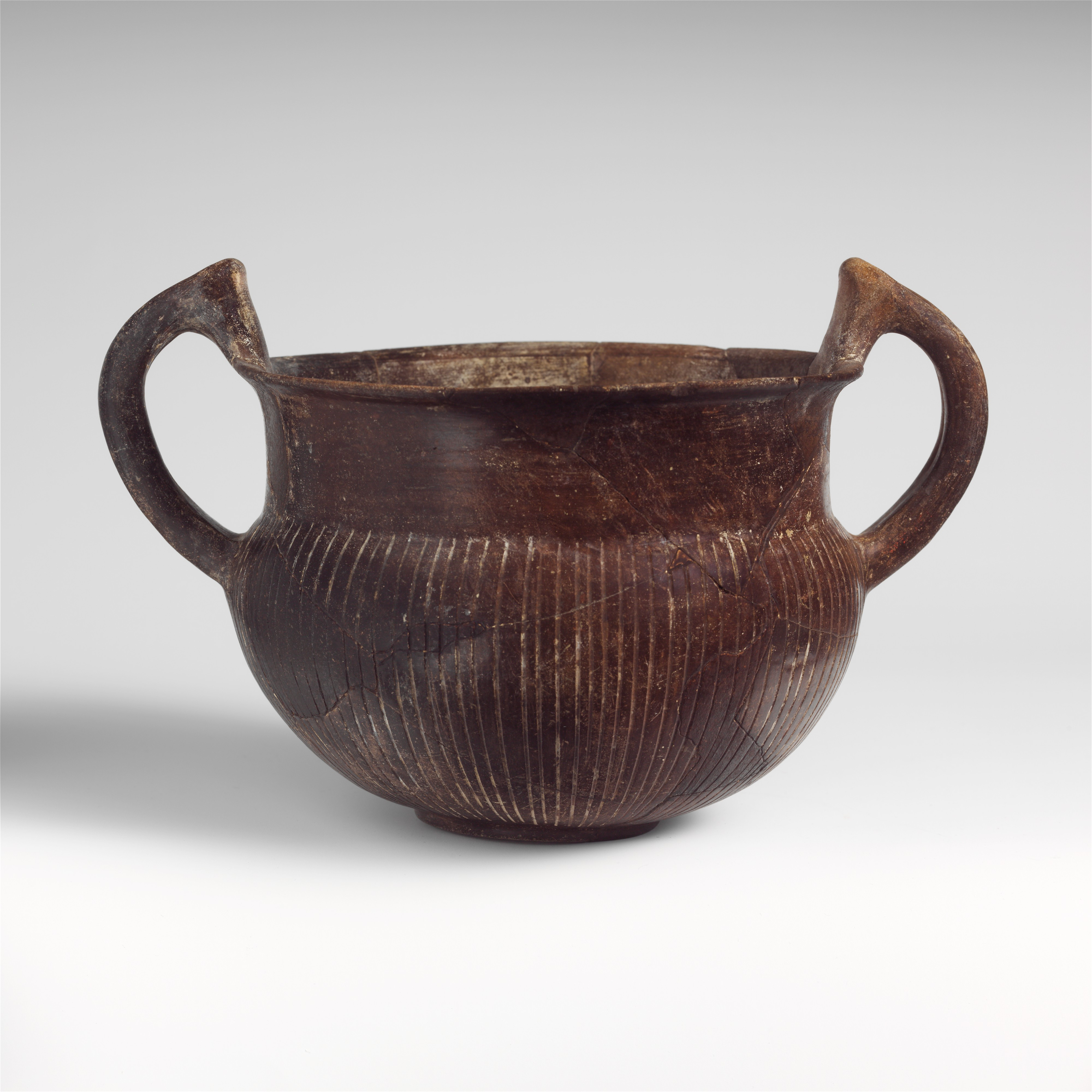
MET DP132251 terracotta two-handled bowl.

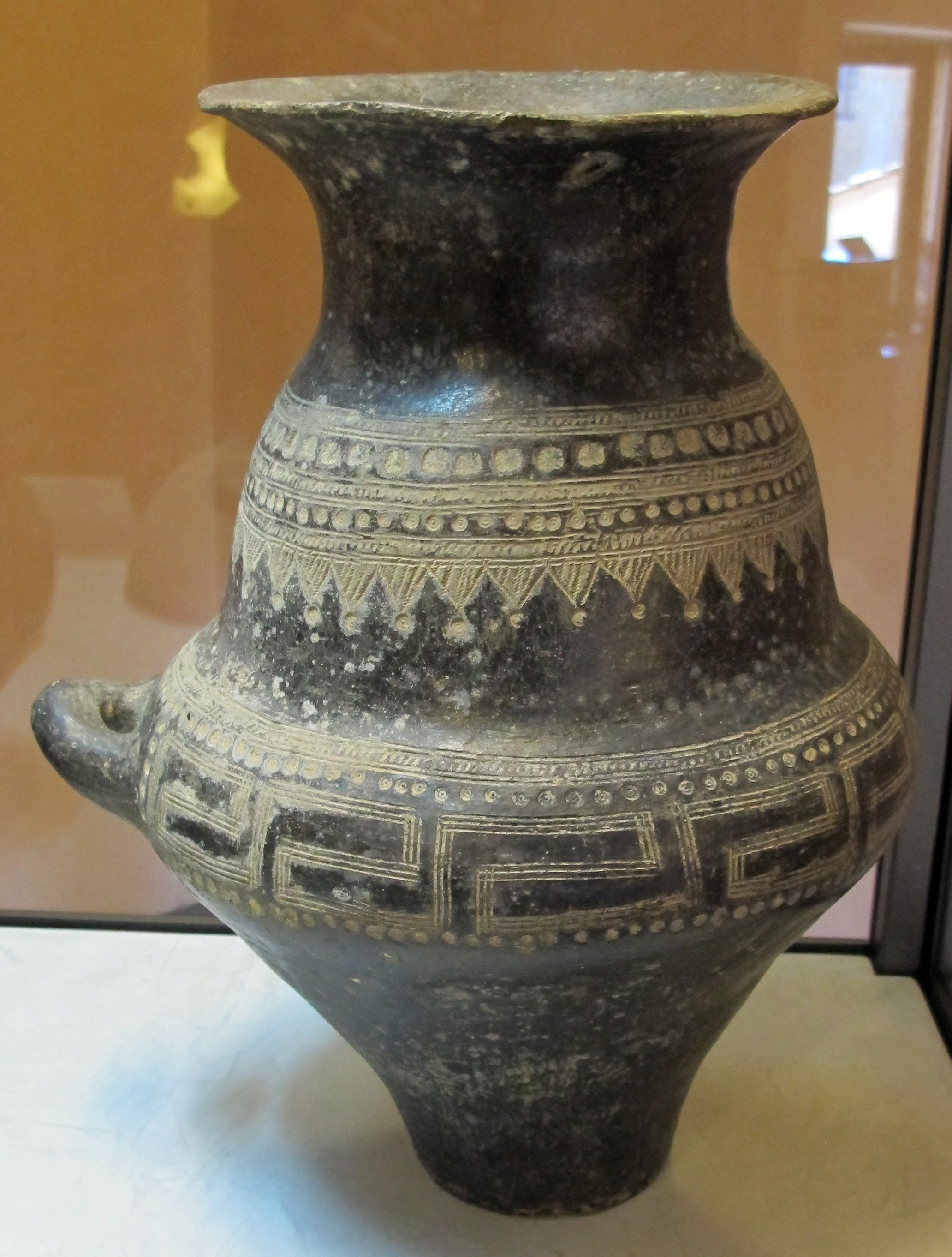
Biconical ossuary, 9th-7th century.

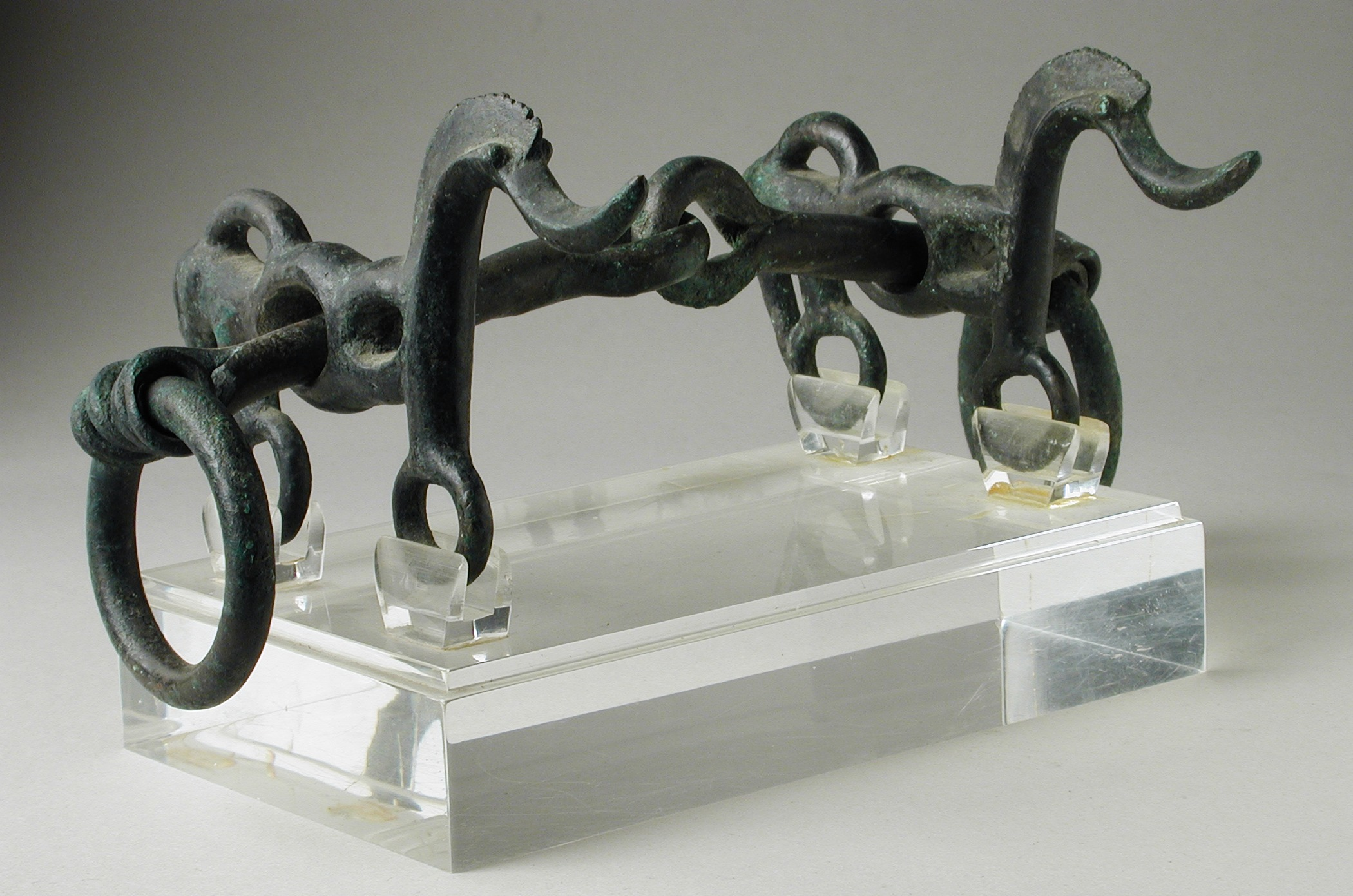
Villanovian bit, LACMA AC1992.152.17.

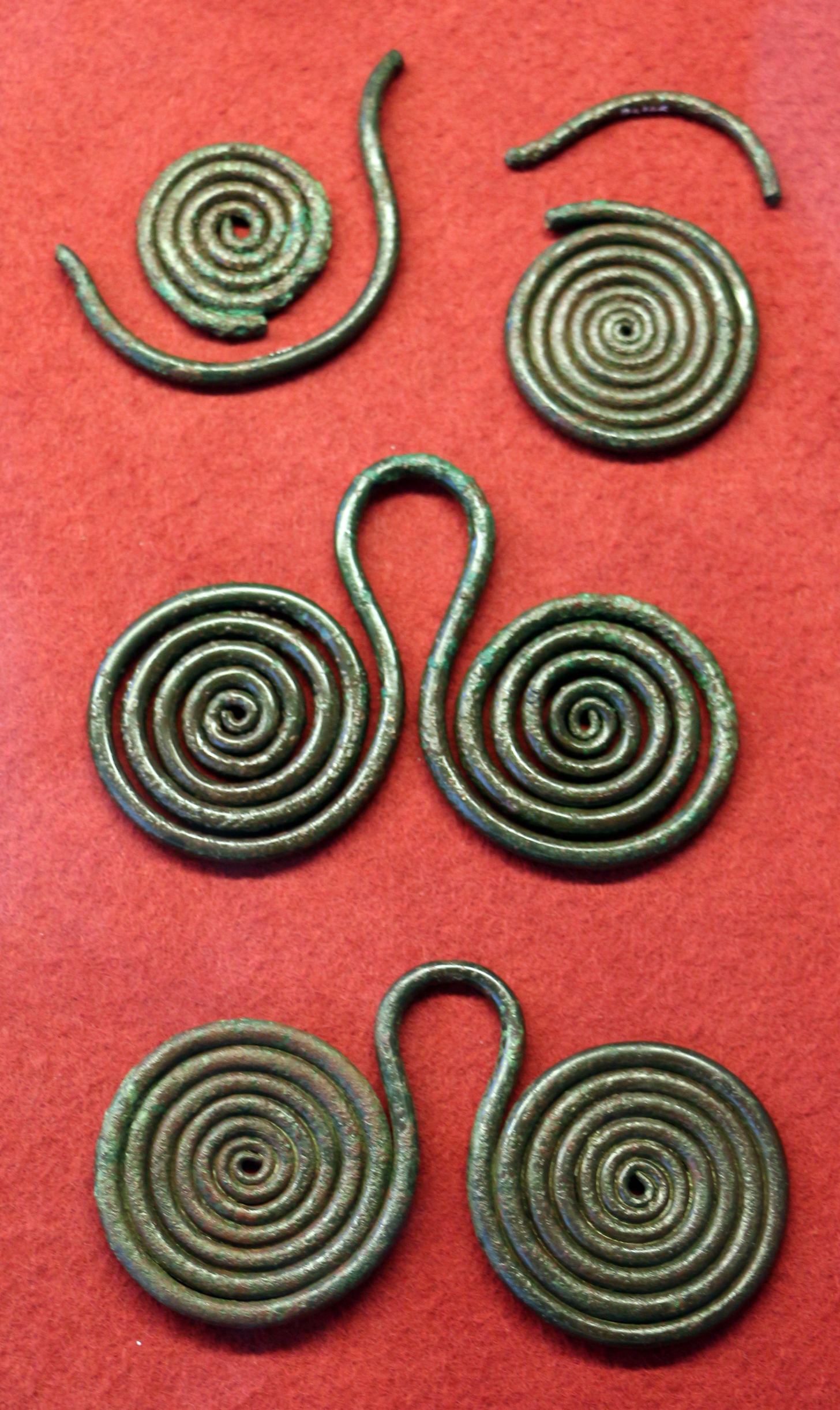
Double spiral bronze pendants, from the island of Giglio, Campese region, 10th-9th century.

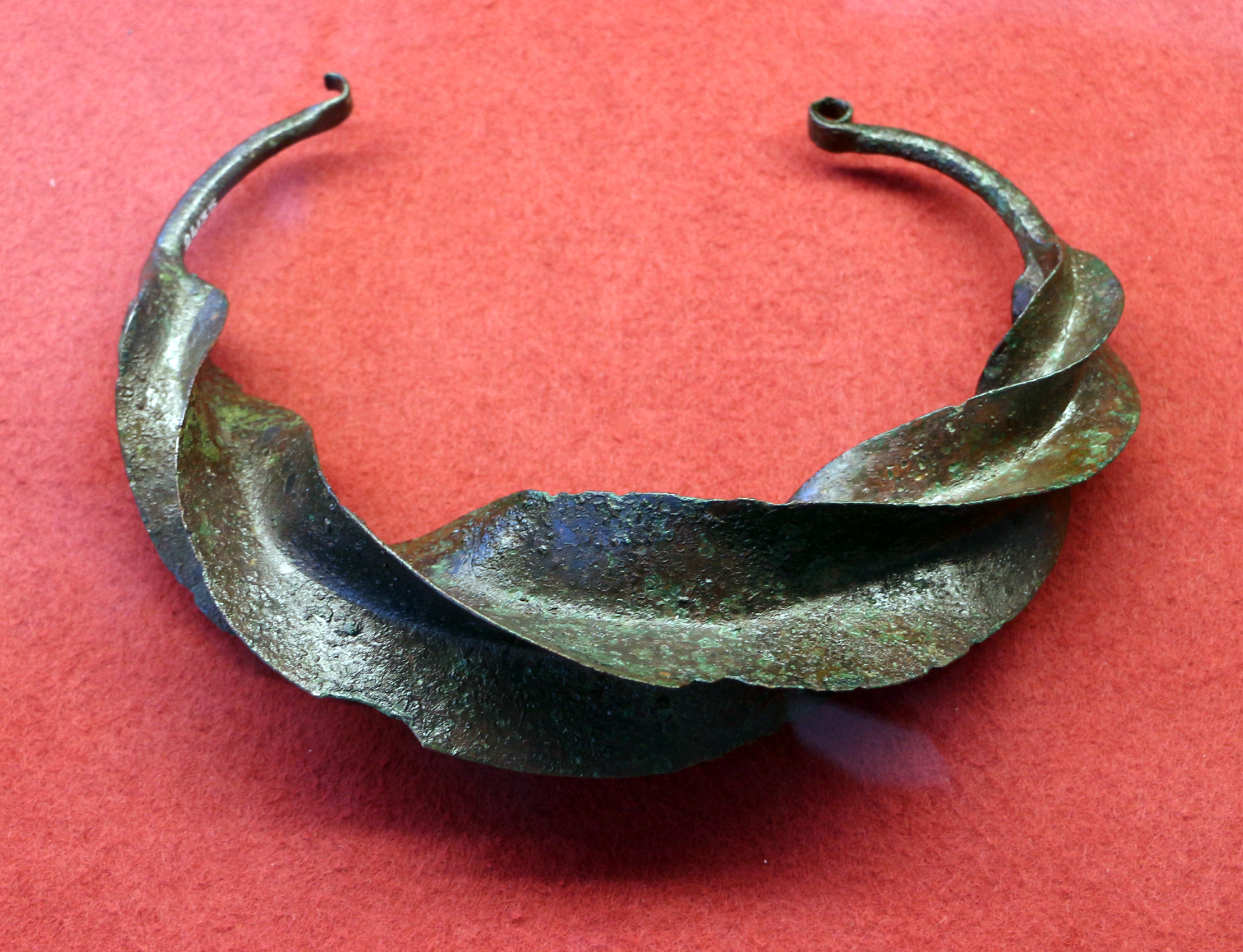
Bronze necklace (torc), from the island of Giglio, Campese region, 10th-9th century.

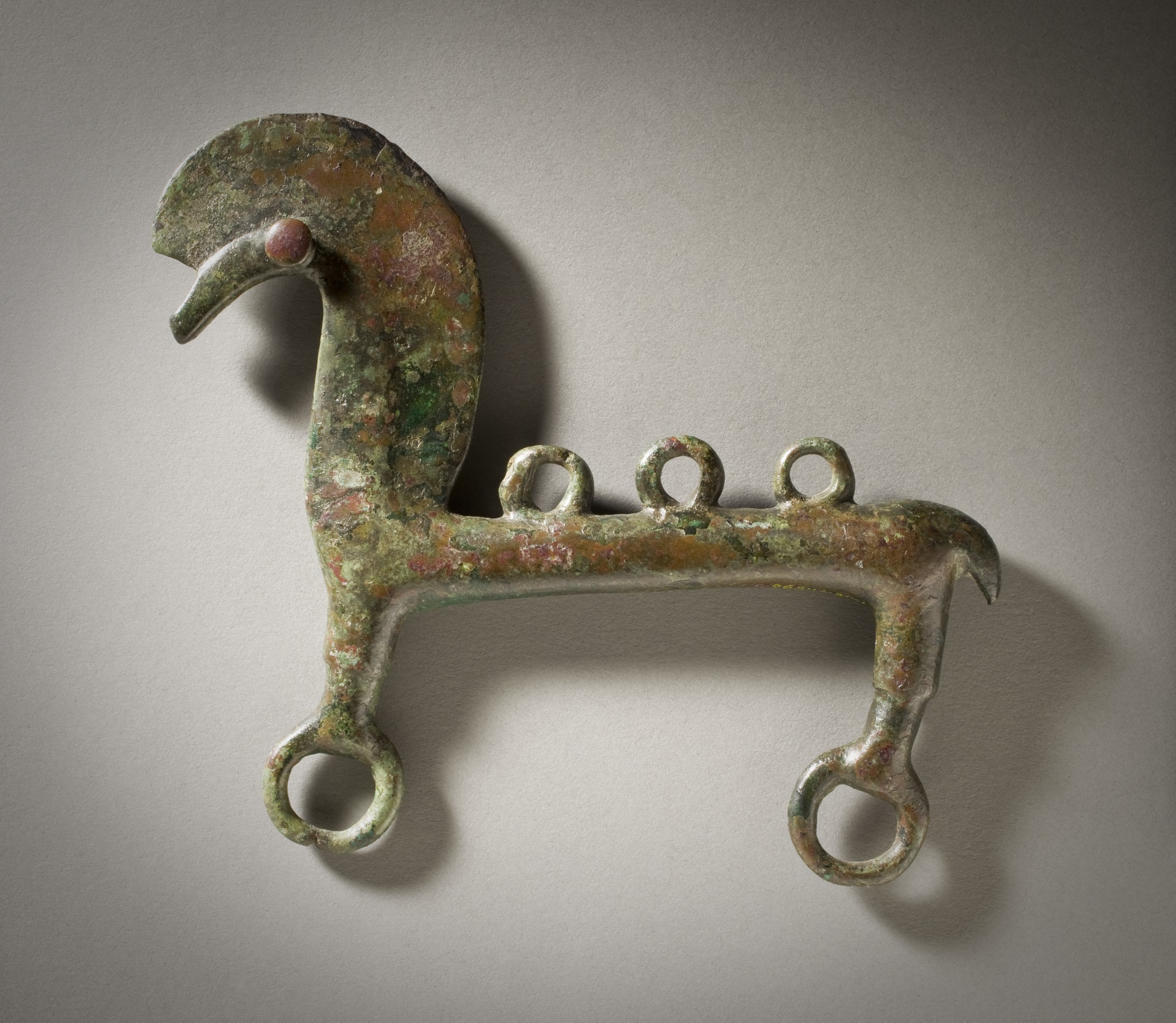
Bronze harness trapping in the shape of a horse. Villanovan, 9th–8th century BCE. LACMA.

== See also ==
- Etruscans
- Proto-Villanovan culture
- Urnfield culture
- Prehistoric Italy

== Sources and further reading ==
- Antonio, Margaret L.; et al. (November 8, 2019). "Ancient Rome: A genetic crossroads of Europe and the Mediterranean". Science. 366 (6466). American Association for the Advancement of Science: 708–714. Bibcode:2019Sci...366..708A. doi:10.1126/science.aay6826. PMC 7093155. PMID 31699931.
- Fowler, Chris (2022). "A high-resolution picture of kinship practices in an Early Neolithic tomb". Nature. 601 (7894): 584–587. Bibcode:2022Natur.601..584F. doi:10.1038/s41586-021-04241-4. PMC 8896835. PMID 34937939.
- Giovanni Gozzadini, La nécropole de Villanova, Fava et Garagnani, Bologna, 1870
- J. P. Mallory, "Villanovan Culture", Encyclopedia of Indo-European Culture, (Fitzroy Dearborn), 1997.
- Gilda Bartoloni, "The origin and diffusion of Villanovan culture." in M. Torelli, (editor) The Etruscans, pp 53–74. (Milan), 2000.
- Mary E. Moser, The "Southern Villanovan" Culture of Campania, (Ann Arbor), 1982.
- David Ridgway, "The Villanovan Cemeteries of Bologna and Pontecagnano" in Journal of Roman Archaeology 7: pp 303–16 (1994)
- David Ridgway, The World of the Early Etruscans, Göteborgs Universitet: The Félix Neubergh Lecture, 2000.
- Perkins, Phil (2017). DNA and Etruscan identity. In: Naso, Alessandro ed. Etruscology. Berlin: De Gruyter, pp. 109–118. URL: https://www.degruyter.com/view/product/128551
