= David Ridgway =

David Ridgway is the name of:

- David Ridgway (politician) (born 1960), South Australian politician
- David Ridgway (scholar) (1938–2012), British archaeologist and Etruscan scholar
- Dave Ridgway (born 1959), Canadian Football League player
- David Frederick Charles Ridgway, former British Ambassador to Bolivia and Cuba
