= Maria Teresa Gozzadini =

Italian Countess and Geologist

Countess Maria Teresa Gozzadini
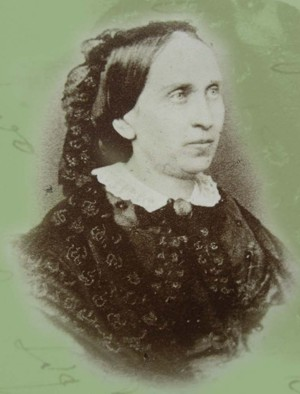
- Born: Maria Teresa di Serego Allighieri; December 8, 1812; Verona
- Died: 24 September 1881 (aged 68); Bologna
- Resting place: Certosa di Bologna; 44°29′45.2″N 11°18′38.5″E
- Other name: Nina
- Education: Convent
- Occupation: Geologist
- Spouse: Giovanni Gozzadini
- Children: Gozzadina
- Parents: Federico Serego Alighieri (father); Anna da Schio (mother)

Maria Teresa Gozzadini (December 8, 1812 - September 24, 1881) was an Italian geologist and countess. For her career, she was known by the pseudonym Nina.

== Early life ==
Maria Teresa Serego Allighier was a descendant of the poet Dante Alighieri.

She was born on December 8, 1812, in Verona, Italy. Her mother was Anna da Schio. Her father was Federico Serego Alighieri. Her mother died while she was 17. Her brother was often in poor health.

She was married to the archaeologist Count Giovanni Gozzadini, and assisted him in his excavation works. Her husband wrote her biography, the Life of Maria Teresa Gozzadini.

The sculptor Salvino Salvini created a marble bust of her.
