= Giovanni Gozzadini =

Italian archeologist

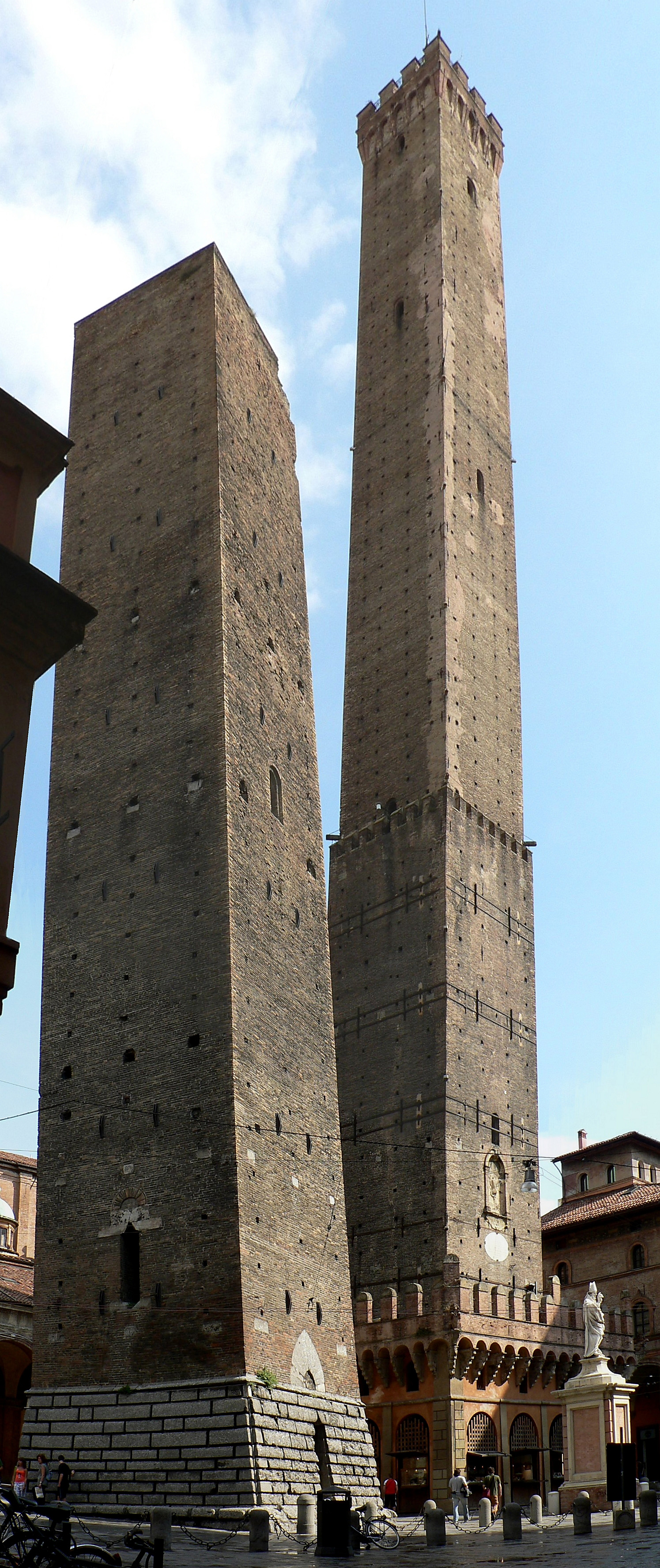
The Towers of Bologna

Giovanni Gozzadini (15 October 1810 – 25 August 1887) was an Italian archaeologist.

The last male heir of a noble family in Bologna, that had given the city men-at-arms, doctors, and jurists, Giovanni was a highly educated man in other areas such as politics. His excavations in a necropolis on his property at Villanova (Castenaso, eight kilometres south-east of Bologna), lasting from 1853 to 1855, involved 193 tombs, six of which were separated from the rest as if to signify a special social status. The "well tomb" pit graves lined with stones contained funerary urns. Thus were unearthed the first remains of the Villanovan culture, the first Iron Age culture in ancient Italy. The name Villanovan derives from that of the estate owned by Gozzadini.

He also undertook the first excavations that brought to light the Etruscan necropolis at Marzabotto, financed by the Conti Aria, who were the landowners of the entire Pianura di Misano.

He is also known for his ground-breaking study of the medieval Towers of Bologna.

He was married to the writer Maria Teresa Gozzadini.

He wrote several monographs including Memoirs for the life of Giovanni II Bentivoglio, Di alcuni eventi in Bologna e nell'Emilia dal 1506 al 1511, Intorno all'acquedotto ed alle terme di Bologna and Studi archeologici e topografici sulla città di Bologna. He also wrote a biography of his wife.

At her death, his only daughter, Gozzadina Gozzadini left the family fortune to the Hospital of Bologna, where the university pediatric clinic carries the family name today, the Clinica Pediatrica Universitaria Gozzadini di Bologna.
