= David Ridgway (scholar) =

British scholar of Italian archaeology and the Etruscans

David Ridgway in 2023

David Ridgway (11 May 1938 – 20 May 2012 in Athens, Greece) was a British scholar of Italian archaeology and the Etruscans.

== Life ==
Born in Athens, Greece, Ridgway studied classics at University College London under Professors Webster, Skutsch and Robertson. After graduating in 1960 he went on to post graduate studies in European and Mediterranean Archaeology in Oxford under Professor C.F.C. Hawkes. From 1968 he taught first as Lecturer and subsequently Reader in Archaeology and finally as Reader in Classics at the University of Edinburgh, where his wife Francesca Romana Serra Ridgway was an honorary fellow for years. (In the archaeology department.) Ridgway and his wife retired in 2003 and moved to London where they both were awarded with an associate level of Fellowship at the Institute of Classical Studies associated with the University of London.

A festschrift in honor of Ridgway and his wife was published in 2006 with the title Across Frontiers: Etruscans, Greeks, Phoenicians & Cypriots. Studies in honour of David Ridgway and Francesca Romana Serra Ridgway.

== Necrology ==
1. Sinclair Bell, Richard Daniel De Puma, Lisa C. Pieraccini, and Stephan Steingräber. "In Memoriam: David Ridgway (1938–2012)". Etruscan Studies 15.2 (2012): 238–242. DOI 10.1515/etst-2012-0012.
2. Phil Davison. "David Ridgway." Herald Scotland Wednesday 13 June 2012
3. "David Ridgway." The Times 11 June 2012.

== Selected publications ==
- 1979 Italy Before the Romans (editor), Academic Press, ISBN 0-12-588020-0
- 1992 The First Western Greeks, Cambridge University Press, ISBN 0-521-42164-0
- 1993 Pithekoussai I, Giorgio Bretschneider, ISBN 88-7689-074-2
- 2002 The World of the Early Etruscans, Paul Åströms Förlag, ISBN 91-7081-189-X
