= Pre-Christian Slavic writing =

Hypothesized writing system

Pre-Christian Slavic writing is a hypothesized writing system that may have been used by the Slavs prior to Christianization and the introduction of the Glagolitic and Cyrillic alphabets. No extant evidence of pre-Christian Slavic writing exists, but early Slavic forms of writing or proto-writing may have been mentioned in several early medieval sources.

== Evidence from early historiography ==
- The 9th-century Bulgarian writer Chernorizets Hrabar, in his work An Account of Letters (Church Slavonic: О писмєньхъ, O pismenĭhŭ), briefly mentions that, before becoming Christian, Slavs used a system he had dubbed "strokes and incisions" or "tallies and sketches" in some translations (Old Church Slavonic: чръты и рѣзы, črŭty i rězy). He also provided information critical to Slavonic palaeography with his book.

Before, the Slavs did not have their own books, but counted and divined by means of strokes and incisions, being pagan. Having become Christian, they had to make do with the use of Roman and Greek letters without order [unsystematically], but how can one write [Slavic] well with Greek letters... (Note: In this place are listed eleven examples of Slavic words, such as живѣтъ /živět/ "life", which can hardly be written using the unadapted Roman or Greek letters (i.e. without diacritics changing their sound-values).) and thus it was for many years.

—

- Another contemporaneous source, Thietmar of Merseburg, describing a Rethra temple remarked that the idols there had their names carved out on them ("singulis nominibus insculptis", Chronicon 6:23).
- Chapter III of Vita Cyrilli describes Cyril finding two Christian books written with "Rus characters" during his trip to Korsun. This trip precedes Cyril's mission in Moravia described in Chapter IV of Vita Cyrilli.

Hereby the Philosopher [Cyril] found Gospel and Prayer Book written in Rus characters, and found a man who spoke that language. And he talked to the man and understood the meaning of that language by matching the differences in the vowels and consonant with those in his own tongue. And by praying to God, he could soon read in and speak that language. And many were amazed by that, glorifying God.

— Vita Cyrilli, Chapter III

== Evidence from archaeology ==
=== Alekanovo inscription ===
Reproduction of the Alekanovo inscription.

In 1897, Russian archeologist Vasily Gorodtsov unearthed a small clay pot 15 cm high located in a Slavic burial site in the village of Alekanovo, Ryazan Oblast, Russia. The pot had a group of undeciphered characters that were dated by Gorodtsov to 10th–11th century AD, called the Alekanovo inscription. A year later Gorodtsov discovered similar characters on sherds, also in Alekanovo.

=== Kerch amphora ===
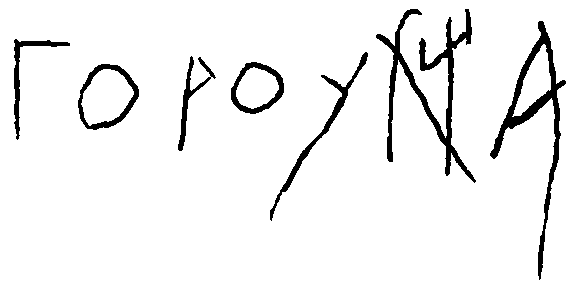
Cyrillic inscription on Kerch amphora with word гороухща (goruhšča).

In 1949, a Kerch amphora was found in Gnezdovo in Smolensk Oblast, Russia, containing what may be the earliest inscription in Old East Slavic. The amphora was found in the grave of a Scandinavian merchant who traded with the Orient. The excavator read the one-word inscription as Cyrillic "гороухща" (goruhšča), inferring that it designated mustard that was kept there. This explanation has not been universally accepted and the inscription seems to be open to different interpretations. Other scholars have read the apparent "хщ" letter combination as an "N", resulting in a transcription as "гороуна" which could be either Cyrillic or Greek and which might represent an Arabic name Hārūn with possessive suffix (Härün's amphora). The inscription is dated to the early 10th century, which suggests a hitherto unsuspected popularity of the Cyrillic script in pre-Christian Rus'. Different sources prove that the Slavic and Norse population of Rus' had trade connections to the Muslim and Asian worlds.

=== Prague runic inscription ===
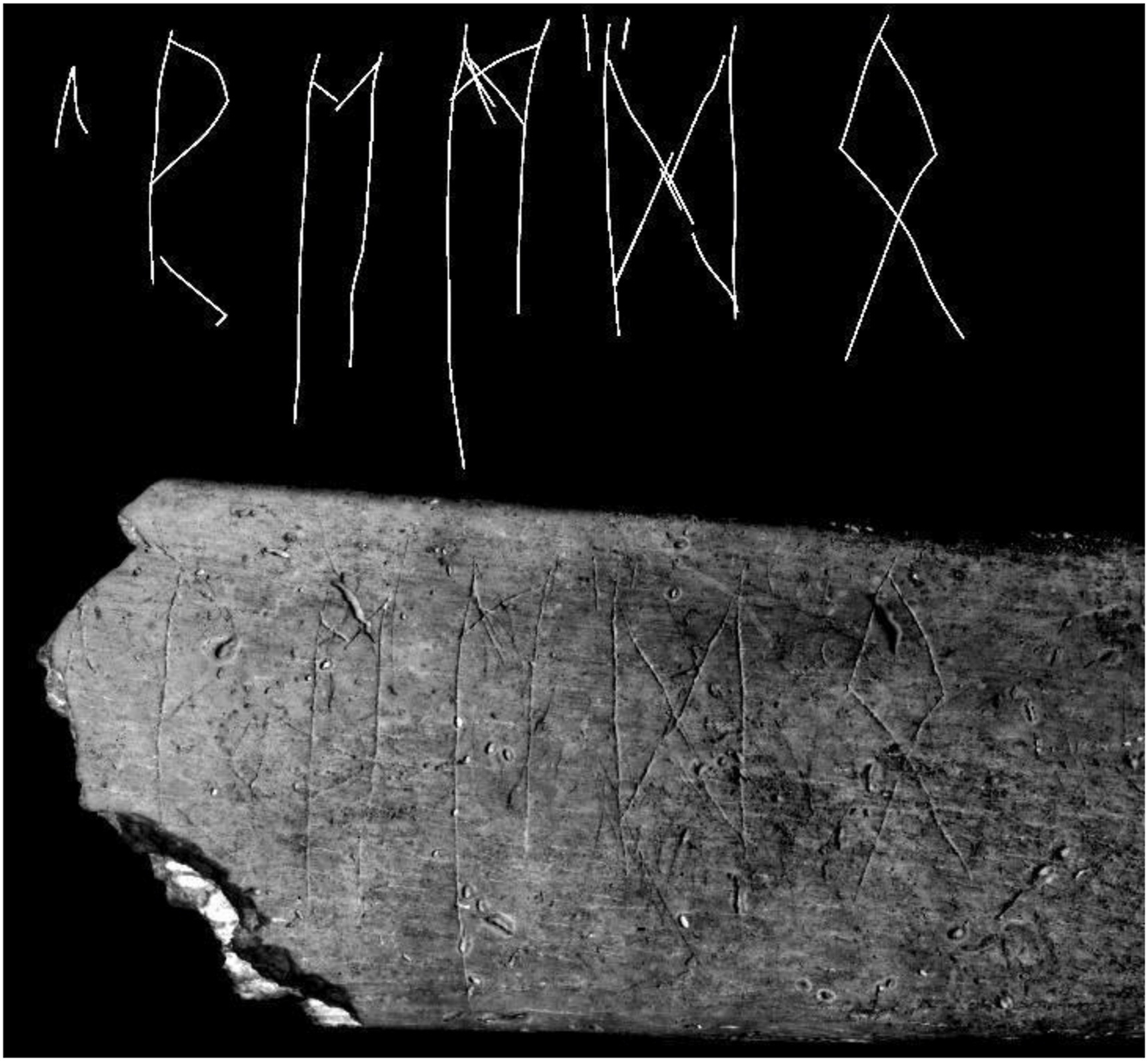
The bone with elder futhark inscription found in the early slavic settlement in Lány (near Břeclav) in the Czech Republic.

In 2021 new archaeological evidence of an early instance of writing among a Slavic population was published. In 2017 a cattle bone, dated 585–640 AD, with runes of the Germanic Elder Futhark was discovered in a Prague culture settlement near Břeclav in the Czech Republic.

The inscription contains no recognizable words in either Slavic or any other language but seems to represent an attempt at an abecedary, reading as the latter part of the Elder Futhark:

ᚠᚢᚦᚨᚱᚲᚷᚹ	᛬	ᚺᚾᛁᛃᛇᛈᛉᛋ	᛬	ᛏᛒᛖᛗ[ᛚᛜ]ᛞᛟ
fuþąrkgw	:	hnijïpzs	:	tbem[lŋ]do

It may have been incised by people of Germanic origin that remained in the region after the departure of the Lombards, or the runes may have been engraved by a Slav. In either case, the find attests to a direct interaction between the Slavic and Germanic ethnolinguistic groups. If runic knowledge was transferred from Germanic peoples to Slavs, it must have happened in Central Europe as judged by the rune shapes or it may have persisted in the region as a result of population continuity between Lombards and Slavs.

== Evidence against ==
In the Vita Cyrilli, Rastislav, the duke of Moravia, sent an embassy to Constantinople asking Emperor Michael III to send learned men to the Slavs of Great Moravia, who being already baptised, wished to have the liturgy in their own language, and not Latin and Greek. The emperor called for Constantine and asked him if he could accomplish this task, even though he was in poor health. Constantine replied that he would gladly travel to Great Moravia and teach them, as long as the Slavs had their own alphabet to write their own language in, to which the Emperor replied that not even his grandfather and father and let alone he could find any evidence of such an alphabet. Constantine was distraught, and was worried that if he invented an alphabet for the Slavs he'd be labelled a heretic.

Събравъ же съборъ Цѣсар̑ь призъва Кѡнстантїна Фїлософа, и сътвори и слꙑшати рѣчь сьѭ. И рече: Вѣмь тѧ трѹдьна сѫшта, Фїлософе, нъ потрѣба ѥстъ тебѣ тамо ити; сеѩ бо рѣчи не можетъ инъ никътоже исправити ꙗкоже тꙑ. Отъвѣшта же Фїлософъ: И трѹдьнъ сꙑ и больн̑ь тѣломь, съ радостьѭ идѫ тамо, аште имѣѭтъ бѹкъви въ ѩзꙑкъ свой. И рече Цѣсар̑ь къ нѥмѹ: Дѣдъ мой и отьць и ини мъноѕи искавъше того, не сѫтъ того обрѣли, то како азъ могѫ то обрѣсти? Фїлософъ же рече: То къто можетъ на водѫ бесѣдѫ напьсати и ѥретїчьско имѧ обрѣсти?

— Vita Cyrilli, Chapter XIV

According to Alexey Karpov, this text is a later insertion in the chronicle, and its authenticity is questioned.

== Pseudoscientific ideas ==
The theme of "ancient Slavic writing", including "Slavic runes", is popular in pseudo-history (folk history) and pseudo-linguistic writings. Many inscriptions, both traditionally considered in the series of Slavic pre-Cyrillic writing and other cultures (Etruscan texts or the Phaistos Disc), were repeatedly amateurishly "deciphered" as Russian and Slavic without relying on scientific data. Such readings were offered by Gennady Grinevich, Valery Chudinov, and others.

The Russian Empress Catherine the Great was interested in ancient Slavic history and considered the toponymy of Spain, France, Scotland, India, and America as "Slavic". In her opinion, the early kings of France and Spain were Slavs by origin, and Etruscan and runic monuments were associated with ancient Slavic writing. She then came up with the idea that the Slavs conquered Europe three times from the Don to Sweden and England.

The idea of the connections of the Slavs with the Etruscans was supported by Sebastiano Ciampi, Tadeusz Wolański, and Alexander Chertkov. The Russian teacher Yegor Klassen (1795-1862) saw the Slavs in many regions and eras, starting from antiquity and including the Etruscans, and identified Sanskrit with the Slavic language. He argued that the Veneti were literate and all runic writings were Slavic.

The idea of ancient Slavic writing in its pseudo-historical interpretation is also connected with the Aryan myth. Guido von List, a follower of the German nationalist völkisch movement and the founder of Armanism, argued that the Germanic peoples, or "Aryans", had a written language long before Christianity. In his opinion, the runes contain an encrypted secret meaning that was revealed only to the initiates. The Nazi theorist Herman Wirth, comparing prehistoric drawings and ornaments, saw in them traces of primitive writing. This, in his opinion, proved the existence of an ancient "Atlanto-Nordic culture" created by the "Atlanto-Nordic race" and spreading in waves from the Arctic.

In the 1920s, occult ideas became widespread in Germany. Rudolf Johan Gorsleben, who promoted Aryan mysticism and the idea of the superiority of the Aryans over other races, was an adherent of the magic of runes and considered them "conductors of subtle energies". One of his assistants was the future Nazi racial theorist Hans F. K. Günther.

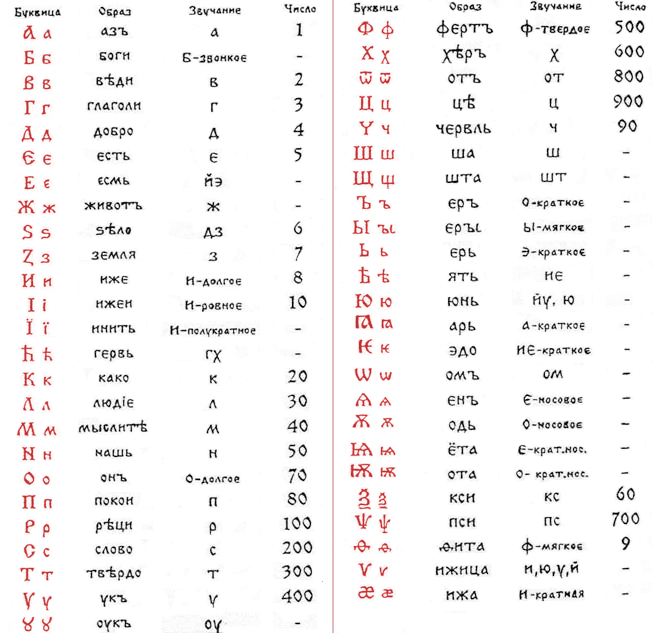
"Old Slavic bukvitsa", first published by Alexander Khinevich for "students of the Asgard Theological School (Omsk)", and which became popular with many Rodnovers. It is positioned as the original alphabet of the ancient Slavs.

The Aryan myth also spread to Slavic neopaganism (Rodnovery), in many forms of which the Slavs are considered the closest descendants of the Aryans or are identified with them. These "Slavic-Aryans", according to neopagans, were the creators of the oldest or one of the most ancient civilizations, which transferred their knowledge and achievements, including writing, to other peoples. Such writing can be understood as allegedly existing "Slavic runes" or "bukvitsa" (historically, the word "bukvitsa" has a different meaning—a synonym for an initial). The idea is widespread that the Cyrillic alphabet was not created based on the Greek alphabet but came from some primordially Slavic alphabet. The absence of pre-Christian literature is explained by the destruction of all this property by Jews or Christians.

Among the Russian émigrés, the idea spread that the most ancient Aryan people were the Rus. Emigrant Yury Mirolyubov wrote about the existence of the Rus in the Paleolithic when they suffered greatly from the invasion of the Neanderthals. In the 1950s, he published the Book of Veles, allegedly written in the pre-Christian alphabet. Mirolyubov argued that Slavic writing formed the basis of Latin and Greek, as well as Scandinavian runes.

One of the founders of modern Russian neopaganism, Valery Yemelyanov, in his book Dezionization (1979), wrote about the great Russian ancient civilization of the "Aryans-Veneti", which had a rich written language and culture and became the founder of all civilizations.

Popular in Soviet times, the novel Primordial Rus (1961) by Valentin Ivanov, adapted into a film in 1985, mentions "tablets and birth records", that is, an indication of the pre-Christian writing of the Slavs.

The symbol of the "All-Linguistic Letter", the earliest pseudo-linguistic teaching of Slavic neopaganism

In the late 1970s, esoteric teacher A.F. Shubin-Abramov, an "academician" of the self-proclaimed "Russian Academy of Sciences, Arts and Culture" in 1992, wrote about the ancient Slavic alphabet and, in his words, "the bearer of tribal memory" and "keeper of the secret knowledge of the initiates", a representative of a kind of guardians of the "true Russian letter". This "ancient Russian all-linguistic letter" consists of 147 characters and is 7500 years old. According to the author, the letters in the works of the classics and ancient texts are not "flat" but spatially defined. In the past, humanity allegedly knew how to read spatial writing, but then people degraded.

The "all-linguistic letter" contained colossal "Vedic knowledge" and was given to people by the Creator, or "Teachers". Shubin-Abramov and his followers consider each character of this letter as having a vast "ideological meaning" ("multidimensional materializing object"), any Russian word - as an abbreviation, a carrier of complex encrypted information, the "disclosure" of which gives phrases endowed with "the deepest meaning". Shubin-Abramov gave the word "Rus" a comprehensive meaning: "the unifying and substantiating beginning of all types of Matters ascending into the Cosmoses, which become Universes."

In such a perspective, the Earth is considered to be "a speck of All-Linguistic Rus'", its creation, "Kievan Rus" - "the name of the Planet after its original capital". Shubin-Abramov called the "human system of life" "Aryan". He argued that people possessed unthinkable knowledge and abilities when they appeared on Earth, but over time they lost them, including most of their letters.

This degradation - "circumcision" - occurred at the behest of "evil forces" - "occupiers-Hebrews". He believed that to "revive the Fatherland", it was necessary to return to the original alphabet and rebel against the "Hebrews". The neopagan concept of "All-Linguistic Literacy" is popularized in the writings of several authors. Some Russian neopagans use the calendar compiled by Shubin-Abramov, in which many terms are explained based on the principles of All-Linguistic Literacy, and an idea of the teaching itself is given.

In the early 1980s, the Moscow geologist Gennady Grinevich claimed to have read various inscriptions found on the territory of Rus', which do not have a generally accepted reading or are not always considered as inscriptions proper. Grinevich accepted the assumption of the syllabic nature of the hypothetical pre-Christian Slavic writing ("writing of strokes and cuts") as a working hypothesis. Then, he tried deciphering inscriptions from other writing systems using the same methods. This led him to the idea of a script "of the Slavs, which they used long before the creation of the Slavic alphabet by Cyril and Methodius."

Grinevich attributed the oldest Cretan writing (Linear A) to the Proto-Slavs. Then he allegedly was able to read the inscription on the Phaistos Disc of the 18th century BC, found in Crete. There, in his opinion, complaints of refugees from the "Rusich tribe" were recorded, who were forced to leave their native "Rusiuniya" and move to Crete. With the support of the Indologist Natalya Guseva, Grinevich published his "discoveries" in the Sovetskaya Rossiya newspaper.

The Slavs, according to Grinevich, had written language from the 5th millennium BC (he refers to the Tărtăria tablets of the 4th millennium BC with pictographic signs found in Romania). Slavic culture allegedly became the basis of many other ancient cultures, and Slavic writing became the basis of all other writing systems. Grinevich has several followers who "read" various texts as Old Slavonic. Grinevich's ideas were taken up by the Krasnodar writer Alexey Trekhlebov (Vedagor), who was close to Ynglism. Trekhlebov called Grinevich a "linguist" and "decoder" and argued that the "discovery" of "the oldest Slavic writing" allegedly received support in science, and scientists called this writing "Slavic runic".

In the late 1980s, the former geologist and sailor A. S. Ivanchenko wrote that the Slavs, or "Russians", invented phonetic writing. The "Russian" culture allegedly surpassed ancient Mesopotamia. All other nations received the alphabet from them, starting with the Etruscans and Trojans. According to Ivanchenko, the words of the Russian language are abbreviations and have the deepest meaning.

In the 1990s, Omsk esoteric Alexander Khinevich created Ynglism, a neopagan doctrine that combines esotericism, neo-Nazism, and radical Rodnoverie. Ynglists claim that different human races, including the "white race", come from different constellations. Ynglists created several alphabets, which, according to them, "Slavs and Aryans" used for thousands of years. Each sign has not only a phonetic but also a semantic meaning (image).

The Ynglists interpret many words of the Russian language as abbreviations: for example, fasting (Russian: пост, post) is understood as "complete cleansing of the creator's own bodies" (Russian: полное очищение собственныхъ телесъ сотворяша, polnoye ochishcheniye sobstvennykh teles sotvoryasha). The teachings of the Ynglists are outlined in the Slavic-Aryan Vedas, a falsification presented as a translation of the ancient "Slavic-Aryan" scripture, the oldest part of which was allegedly created 40,000 years ago. The Slavic-Aryan Vedas were written by Khinevich himself.

V. Pike, a Ukrainian-Canadian, argued for the unconditional autochthonousness of Ukrainians, their widespread settlement in Asia Minor and Europe in ancient times, and the priority of the Ukrainian language, writing, and religion over other Indo-European and many non-Indo-European traditions.

The idea of ancient pagan writings, allegedly preserved by the "schismatic Old Believers", was introduced into fiction by Sergei Alexeyev and Yury Sergeyev. The Slavs, according to Alexeyev, are the heirs of the "Aryans" who came out of Hyperborea. According to Alexeyev, Slavic manuscripts were destroyed by Christian priests.

The writer Yuri Nikitin, in his works, represented the Russians as the basis on which all other peoples were formed. He considered the Phoenicians as "the purest Rus", who created the oldest written language in the world. The writer Vladimir Shcherbakov published a book for high school students through the Prosveshcheniye publishing house, in which he developed ideas about the relationship of Russians with the Etruscans and Thracians and the Slavs-Veneti, who once lived from India to Western Europe and gave the local peoples writing and statehood.

The Ukrainian literary critic Boris Yatsenko shared the idea of the existence and autochthonous nature of the ancient "Ukrainian alphabet", primary in comparison with the West Semitic (Canaanite) alphabet from the Levant and Greek and Latin scripts. In his opinion, in the early Iron Age, if not earlier, "one Slavic people - the Ukrainians" lived in Central Europe.

In 1997-2001, folk history author Valery Dyomin, an author in the genre of folk history, organized the "Hyperborea" amateur expedition on the Kola Peninsula. Members of the expedition reported finding traces of the ancient "Aryan" civilization, including "ancient signs similar to the letter of the Druids", or "runes", about the most ancient "Ogham writing". However, Dyomin and his followers published no documentary evidence of these discoveries. Single photographs of the expedition members demonstrate various natural geological formations. The "notches" on the rocks, interpreted as "alphabetic signs" of the most ancient Paleolithic writing, were cuts left by geologists.

The neopagan writer Alexander Asov, a popularizer of the Book of Veles, considers it a storehouse of memory, covering the events of the last 20 thousand years. He created his version of the origin and pre-Christian history of the Slavs, whom he identifies with the "white race" and with the "Aryans", immigrants from Hyperborea. In many of his editions of the Book of Veles, Asov supplemented its text with several other works, such as the Slavic-Russian Vedas - Asov's "reconstructed" Songs of the Gamayun Bird and The Book of Kolyada and pseudo-pagan texts published by the forger Alexander Sulakadzev at the beginning 19th century, such as "Yarilin's Book" and "Trizna Boyanova".

Contrary to the opinion of scientists that has been established since the time of Sulakadzev, Asov considers them not fake but genuine compositions, offering his reading and translation. The "Songs of the Bird Gamayun" is "a kind of author's stylization, which is based on a pseudo-reconstruction of the hypothetical "knot writing" of the ancient Slavs, identified by the compilers of the collection [Russian Vedas] with the legendary "strokes and cuts"."

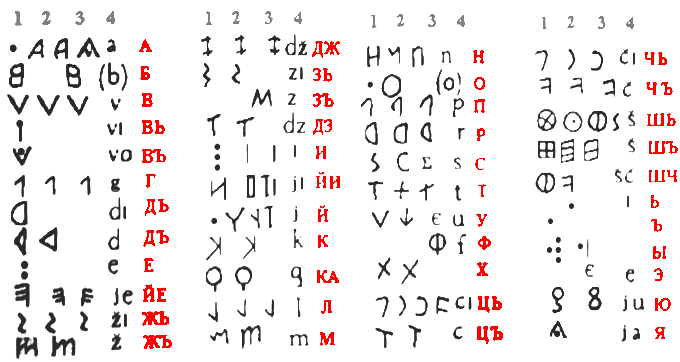
A "deciphering" of the Etruscan alphabet by Valery Chudinov

From the 1990s to the early 2020s, the philosopher Valery Chudniov developed the idea of the supernatural nature of the "Old Slavic bukvitsa", allegedly discovered by him. Chudinov was a follower of Gennady Grinevich, who, in 2005, headed the Institute of Old Slavonic Literature and Old Eurasian Civilization in the Russian Academy of Natural Sciences (RANS).

Chudinov "discovered" the system of syllabic writing, which he called "runitsa" or "Makosh's runes". In addition to the "Old Russian inscriptions", of which Chudinov found a large number, he found "inscriptions" on many other objects, including Paleolithic monuments, connecting the appearance of the "runitsa" with the beginning of the Middle Paleolithic. Another type of writing, singled out by Chudinov, he calls "Rod's runes". This alphabetic script allegedly came from the "runitsa" in the middle of the Middle Paleolithic and is very close to the modern Russian alphabet.

Chudinov found "Rod's runes" and "Makosh's runes" on a mass of images, from photographs of Paleolithic caves and modern drawings to photographs of the surface of the Sun and other space objects. Almost all of these "inscriptions" are, according to Chudinov's terminology, "implicit". The "methods" for identifying and reading "implicit inscriptions" used by Chudinov include examining not the objects themselves but their photographs or sketches from books while increasing the size of the image, enhancing its contrast, and inverting colors to find in small strokes and shadows similarities to "bukvitsa". In Chudinov's opinion, only he knew how to use this method.

Chudinov explained his finding inscriptions on photographs of the Earth's surface and other celestial bodies by the presence of large artificial formations - so-called geoglyphs (as well as "selenoglyphs", "areoglyphs" and "helioglyphs"). The author explained the inscriptions on the background of the photographs as a manifestation of the "subtle world". Chudinov claimed that the first civilization in history was the "Slavic Vedic civilization", and many peoples, including the Etruscans, were, in fact, Russians.

The idea of the origin of the Slavs from the "Aryans" ("ancient Aryans") was popularized by the satirist Mikhail Zadornov. He shared ideas about the Slavic language of the Etruscan script and the "Cretan disc". Not distinguishing between Etruscan inscriptions and the Book of Veles, Zadornov claimed that the Etruscans wrote "on tablets." Having visited the excavations of the Trypillia settlements in Ukraine, he connected the Trypillia culture with the Slavs. According to him, he found "strokes and cuts" there, indicating that "we had writing" six thousand years ago. He also claimed the existence of Slavic "runic signs" of the Mesolithic era near Murmansk.

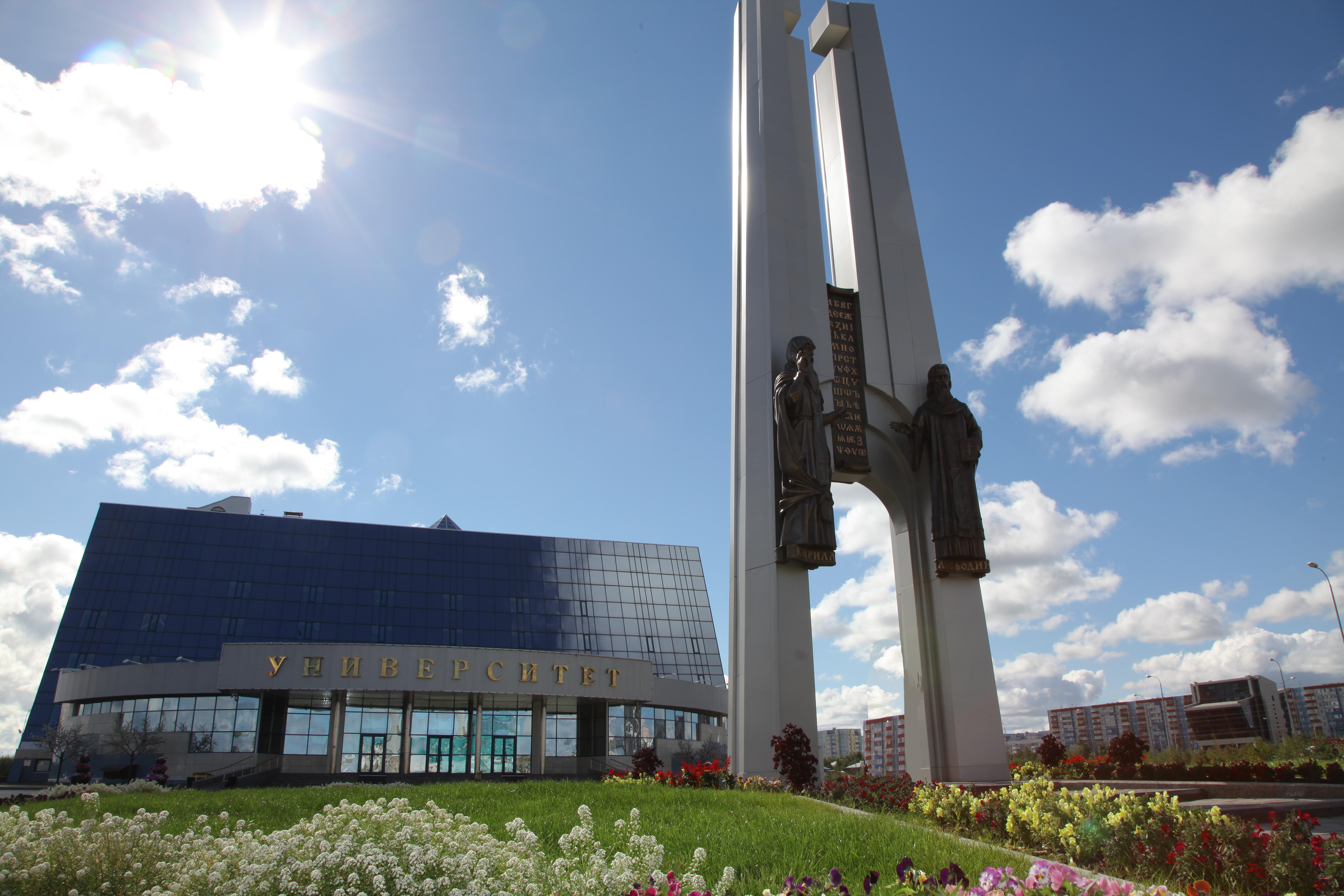
"Bukvitsa" on the monument to Cyril and Methodius in front of Surgut University

A common constructed "Slavic" alphabet is "bukvitsa", allegedly underlying the Russian language and representing an alphabet of 49 letters in the form of a 7x7 table (7 is a sacred number). It is argued that each letter of this alphabet and syllables of two letters contain a certain image, a hidden meaning. All words were created from these image-letters in the Russian language; knowing the images, one can reveal the true meaning of any word. The meanings of these images are as blurred as possible, meaning that any word can be summed up under them.

Bukvitsa is a modified Cyrillic alphabet with the addition of several characters from other alphabets and arbitrary names and interpretations of letters. Its supporters do not provide any evidence of the authenticity of this alphabet. The idea of bukvitsa, like other similar alphabets, suggests that people had to invent a "language of letters" before they made words out of them - that is, to create a script built on images that they are not yet able to speak. Bukvitsa is depicted on the monument to Cyril and Methodius in front of Surgut University: the monument depicts the saints pointing at a scroll with bukvitsa.

Believing to have found a pre-Christian Slavic inscription, the author Galina Kotova attempted to decipher an inverted epitaph from a Jewish tombstone written in Hebrew in 1920. Kotova wrote a detailed article about the "decoding" of this "Slavic" inscription.

In several "documentary" programs by Igor Prokopenko and Oleg Shishkin on the Russian federal TV channel REN TV (2013, 2014, 2016, 2017, etc.), pseudo-historical neopagan ideas are popularized, including the origin of the Slavs from the "Aryans", ancient pre-Christian Slavic "runic books" (the Book of Veles, Boyanov Hymn, and the Book of Kolyada), and the concealment of all this by "official science".

== See also ==
- Proto-writing
- Christianization of the Slavs
