= Bilsk hillfort =

Historic site

- Більське городище (Ukrainian)
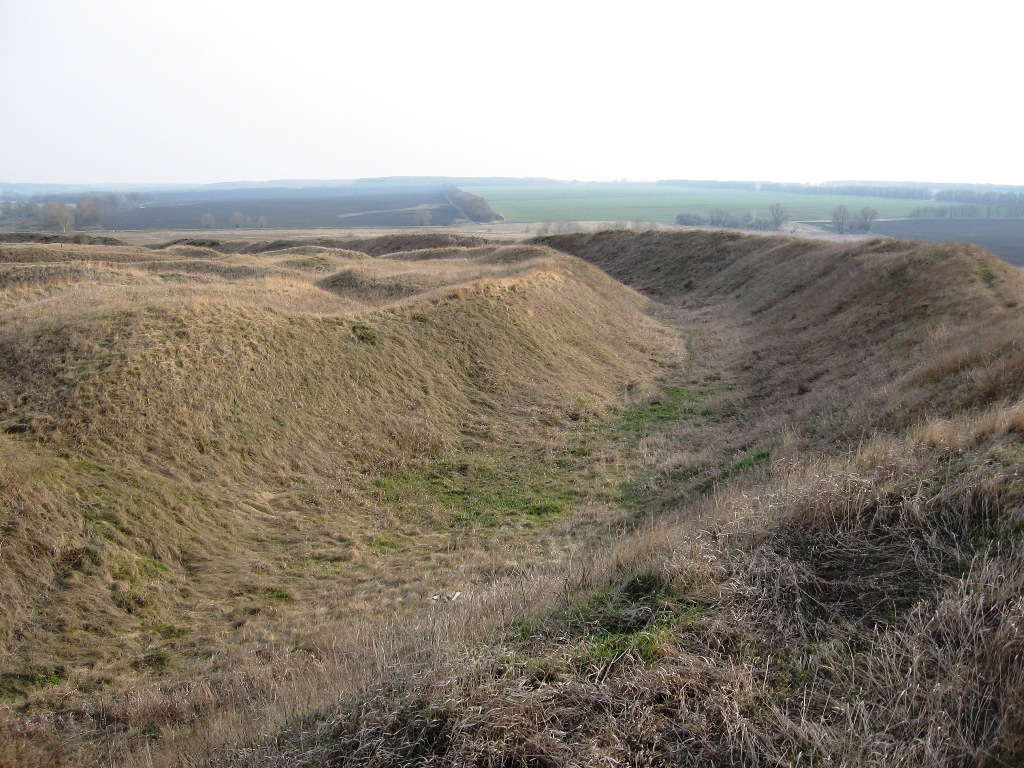
- Ramparts of the Western Bilsk settlement

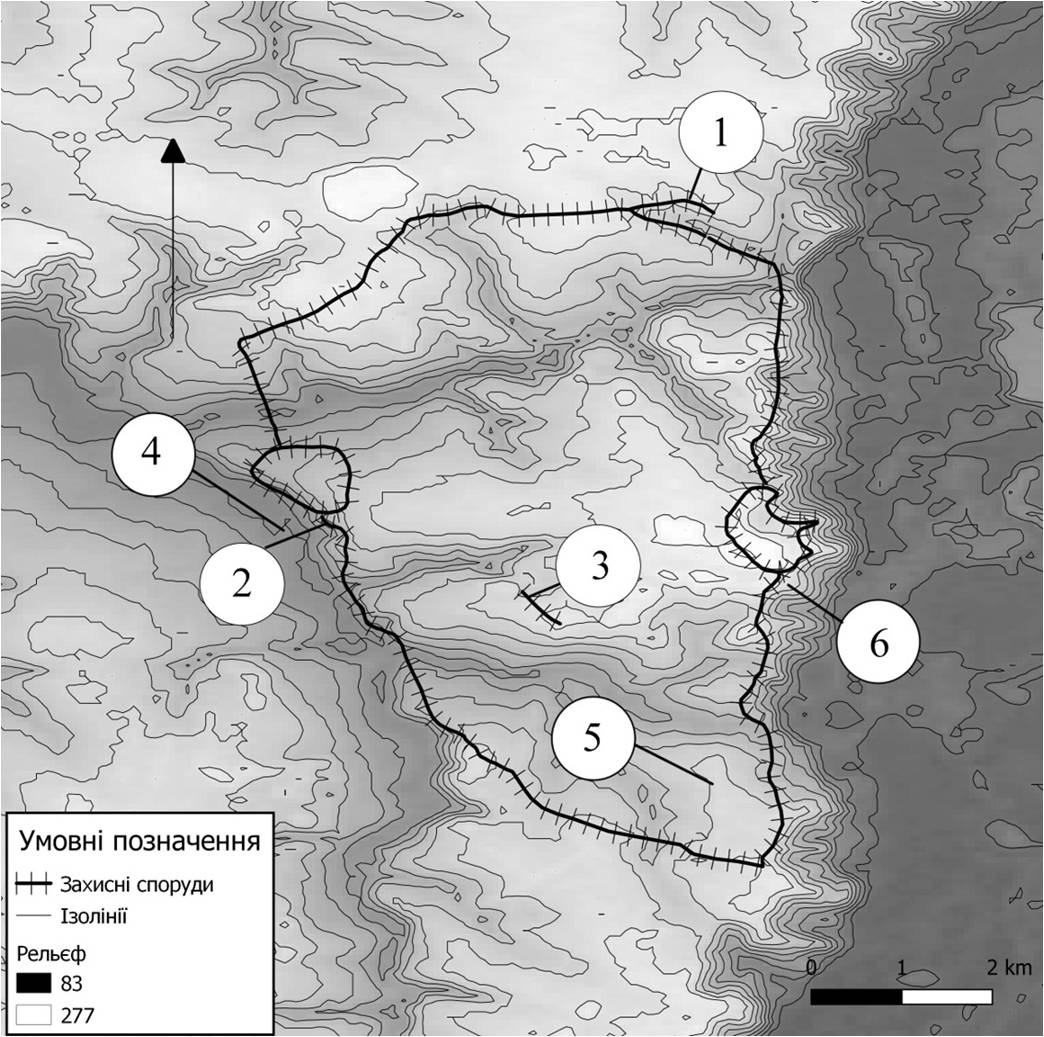
- 50°5′35″N 34°37′54″E
- Associated with: Scythians
- Location: Poltava and Sumy oblasts, Ukraine

Site notes
- Length: 33,833 m (111,001 ft)
- Area: 4,400 ha (11,000 acres)
- Website: http://bilsk.com.ua/

Immovable Monument of National Significance of Ukraine
- Official name: Комплекс пам'яток території і округи Більського городища (Complex of monuments on the territory of the Bilsk hillfort and its surroundings)
- Type: Archaeology
- Reference no.: 160018-Н

Immovable Monument of National Significance of Ukraine
- Official name: Укріплення Більського городища (Fortifications of the Bilsk hillfort)
- Type: Archaeology
- Reference no.: 180018-Н

Bilsk hillfort is a hillfort of the Scythian period (end of 8th to beginning of 3rd centuries BC) located on a hill in the interfluve of the Vorskla and the right tributary of Psel Sukha Hrun near the villages of Bilsk in Poltava Oblast and Kuzemyn in Sumy Oblast.

The hillfort consists of three fortified settlements (Kuzemyn, Western Bilsk, and Eastern Bilsk settlements), united by one defensive wall (Great Bilsk hillfort). The hillfort's total area is 4400 ha. The length of the ramparts is 33,833 m. At that time, Europe had no settlements or fortifications larger than those.

A number of scholars identify the Bilsk site with the Scythian city of Gelonus, which is mentioned by Herodotus (though this view has been disputed). It is the center of the Vorskla group of Scythian fortified settlements.

== Research history ==
The first mentions of the existence of earthen fortifications near the village of Bilsk date back to the 16th–18th centuries. For example, a map of Ukraine by Guillaume de Beauplan of 17th century locates an ancient settlement near Bilsk. At this time, numerous illegal excavations began on the territory of the settlement and the adjacent burial site, and the earthen fortifications were actively used for saltpeter mining, which led to their partial destruction.

Specific information about the fortifications and findings on the territory of the Bilsk hillfort were first provided by the Ukrainian ethnographer Opanas Shafronsky, who, based on personal observations, reports that there are two ancient hillforts near Bilsk, with an earth line connecting them. The researcher measured the fortifications and found arrowheads in the Western Bilsk settlement. Shafronsky attempted to find out when and by whom the fortifications were built, but concluded that "everything is obscured by the darkness of antiquity." Some data about the Bilsk settlement were reported by Philaret Gumilevsky in 1857, who mentions the Western and Eastern settlements, but, unlike Shafronsky, does not view them as a single complex of defensive constructions.

Later, Aleksei Bobrinsky conducted special archaeological research on the territory of the settlement. Based on his findings, he published an article in which a detailed description of the appearance of the Western settlement was given and a schematic plan was published. Bobrinsky mentions the ramparts of the Great Hillfort, but he only calls the Western settlement the "Bilsk hillfort" (he considered the Eastern settlement separate from the complex). Bobrinsky was the first researcher to draw attention to the existence of a Scythian layer on the settlement.

Schematic plans of the Bilsk hillfort were also published by Vasyl Liaskoronsky, who was not yet aware of the Kuzemyn settlement, and erroneously perceived the ramparts of the Great Bilsk hillfort as part of the Serpent's Wall.

The first archaeological excavations at the site were conducted in 1906 by Vasily Gorodtsov, who explored individual sections of the Western settlement and the Great Hillfort, as well as 22 kurgans in the vicinity of the site. During the explorations, the researcher established that the Bilsk hillfort is a defensive complex consisting of three fortifications united by the ramparts of the Great Hillfort.

Since 1954, systematic research of the monument has been conducted by expeditions of Kharkiv University led by Boris Shramko. An expedition of Moscow University led by Boris Grakov participated in the excavations of 1958–1960. In 1968, an expedition of Donetsk University led by Alla Moruzhenko worked on the Western settlement.

In 1987, the Kharkiv University expedition was led by Iryna Shramko. In parallel with it, in 1992–2006, a joint Ukrainian-German expedition worked at the Bilsk hillfort, led by Vyacheslav Murzin (1992–2002), E. V. Chernenko (2003–2004), S. V. Makhortykh (2005–2006) and Professor of the University of Hamburg R. Rolle. Currently, stationary excavations at the Bilsk hillfort are being conducted by the Scythian expedition of the Kharkiv National University under the leadership of Iryna Shramko.

On 19 May 2005, the Bilsk Historic-Cultural Reserve was created.

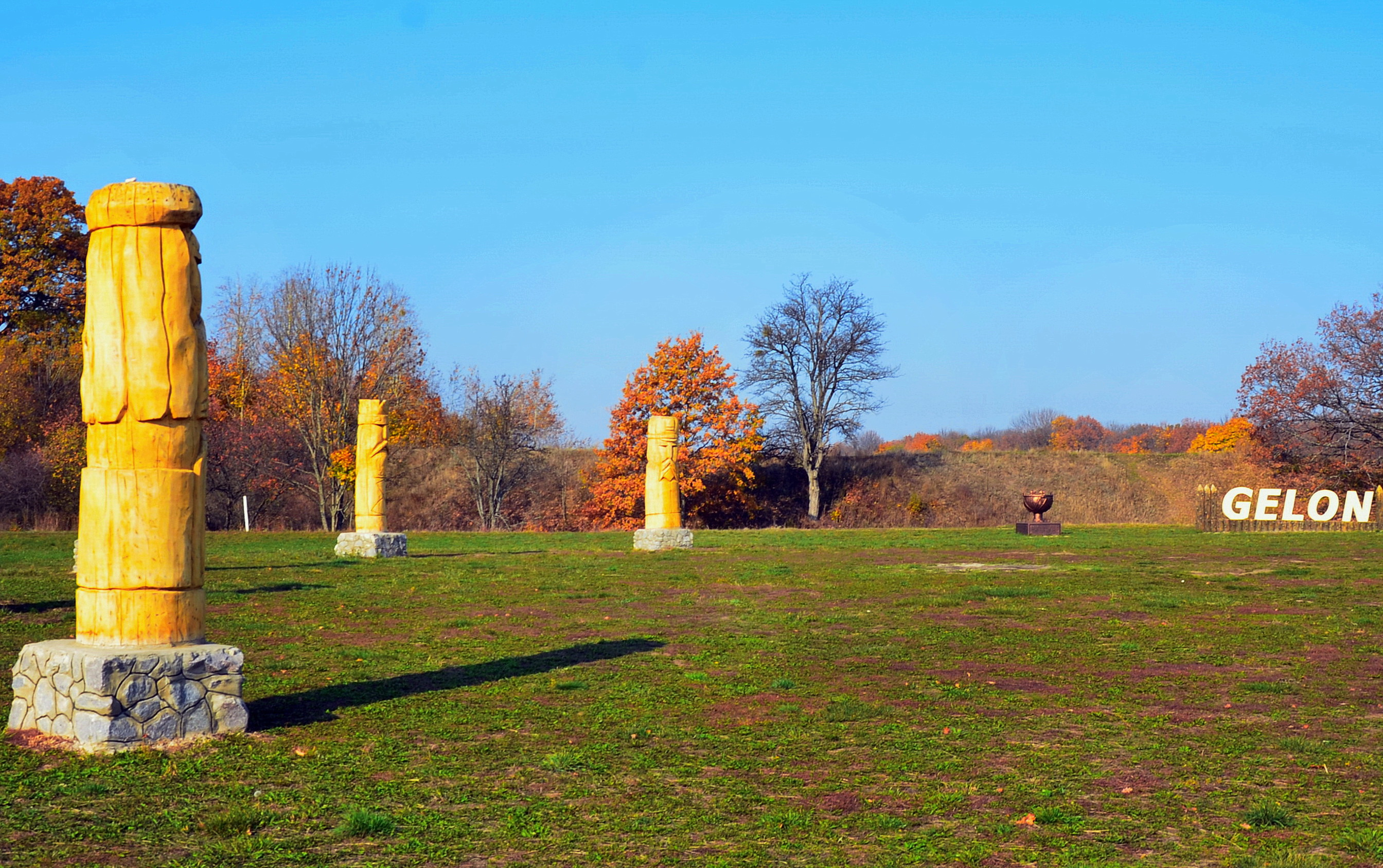
Scythian-style installations at the hillfort

== Description ==
According to its layout, the Bilsk hillfort is a typical cape fortified settlement and is a single complex of the Scythian period (late 8th to early 3rd centuries BC), consisting of three fortified settlements (Kuzemyn, Western Bilsk and Eastern Bilsk settlements), united by one fortress wall (Great Bilsk hillfort). The Bilsk hillfort is located in the center of the East European forest steppe on a hill in the interfluve of the Vorskla and Sukha Hrun rivers on the territory of the village of Bilsk. The settlement is the largest fortification of the Scythian period in Eastern Europe. The total area of the Bilsk hillfort is 4,400 ha. The length of the ramparts is 33,833 m.

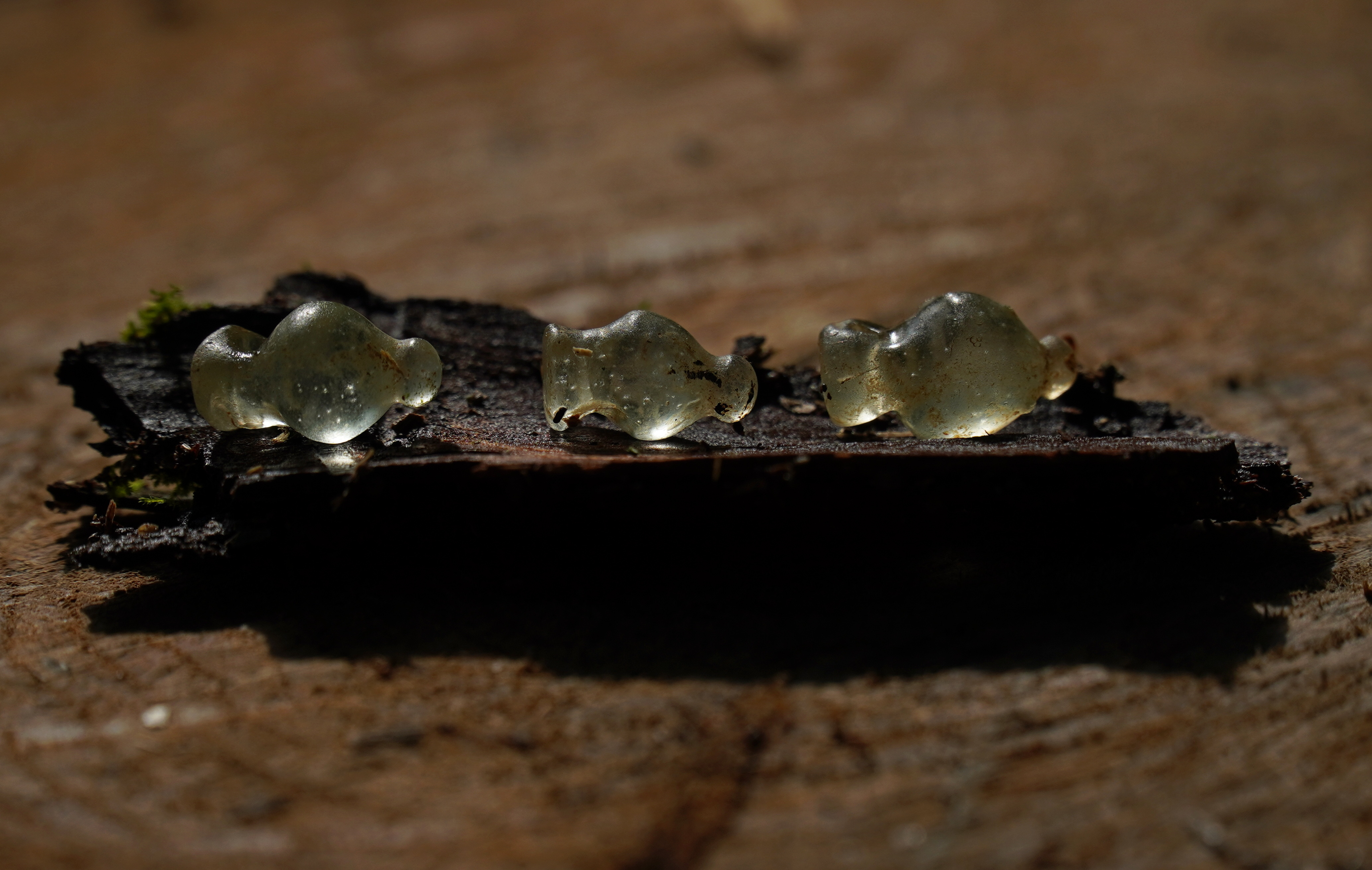
Amphora-shaped glass pendants

The oldest cultural layers on the territory of the Great Bilsk hillfort belong to the Zrubna culture and the Bondarikha culture of the Bronze Age. In the 8th–7th century BC, the first Scythian monuments appear within the boundaries of the Bilsk hillfort. Already in the 7th–6th century BC, two primary fortifications were built: the Western, on the right bank of the Sukha Hrun, and the Eastern, on the right bank of the Vorskla, which were later united by the defensive structures of the Great Bilsk hillfort. Later, in the 5th century BC, the Kuzemyn fortification was completed. All parts of the Bilsk Hillfort were protected by powerful wooden and earthen defensive structures, consisting of deep ditches and high ramparts that crowned the wooden walls behind the towers. The total length of the defensive structures of the Western fortification is 3,270 m, the Eastern fortification is 3,870 m, the Kuzemyn fortification is 898 m, and the Great Bilsk fortification is 25,995 m.

The Bilsk hillfort was a significant political and cultural center of the Scythian period, which was inhabited by a multi-ethnic population: Budini, Gelonians, Neuri and, probably other ethnic groups. During excavations at the site, the remains of semi-dugouts and above-ground dwellings were discovered and studied, various farm buildings for economic purposes — cellars, granary pits, barns, drying rooms, etc., the remains of artisan workshops — blacksmiths, bronze foundries, jewelers, potters, bone carvers, etc. Certain planning principles for the placement of farmsteads and the presence of two-story wooden buildings are noted on the Eastern settlement. There are remains of altars and temples, in one of which, it is possible that certain astronomical observations were also carried out. Numerous finds of ceramic sculptures — anthropomorphic, zoomorphic and ornithomorphic figurines — were also discovered at the site. Other motif objects indicate the existence of agricultural fertility cults among the local population.

The population of the Bilsk settlement existed due to farming, gardening, cattle breeding, hunting, various crafts and home industries, and trade. Trade relations of the local population were quite intensive and large-scale. The favorable geographical location of the settlement allowed the use of an extensive system of river and land routes. The main river route led from the pier near the Kuzemyn fortification along the Vorskla to the Dnieper, then to the Greek city of Olbia on the coast of the Dnieper–Bug estuary. The land route — through a ford on the Vorskla — headed to the ancient Muravsky Trail, which ran through the steppes to the Crimea, where there were several ancient Greek cities. Of great importance were also the roads and their branches along the plateau of the right bank of the Vorskla River to the Perevolochna crossing and the interfluve of the Psel and Sula rivers — the Romodanivsky Route, which connected the southwestern and western trade routes with the right-bank forest-steppe neighbors through the Kremenchuk and Hradyzk crossings. Numerous finds of imported products at the settlement, especially ancient painted dishes, amphoras, and glassware, indicate connections with many centers of the ancient world.

In the course of its historical development, according to a number of researchers, the Bilsk hillfort turned from the center of a tribal union into an urban center, which is identified with the city of Gelonus mentioned by Herodotus. The basis of its development was crafts and trade, but in the 3rd century BC, important political and economic changes occurred in the south of Eastern Europe, caused by the influence of climatic factors, which disrupted the economic and cultural ties of the population of the Bilsk hillfort and led to the decline of local crafts and trade. The productivity of agricultural lands decreased significantly. Life in the settlement gradually faded away and it ended its existence as a significant center.

In later times, small settlements of the Kyiv, Chernyakhiv, and Penkivka cultures existed on the territory of the settlement. There are some isolated finds of the Saltiv and Romny cultures, and isolated Pecheneg antiquities. At the Eastern settlement, there are also traces of a settlement from the Kievan Rus' period, represented by fragments of circular vessels from the 12th–13th centuries, arrowheads, a water-bearing fibula, and a spur. Within the Great Fortification, cultural layers from the late Ukrainian Middle Ages of the early 17th century are known. They are associated with the development of saltpeter extraction and the settlement of this territory by immigrants from Right-bank Ukraine and Cossacks.

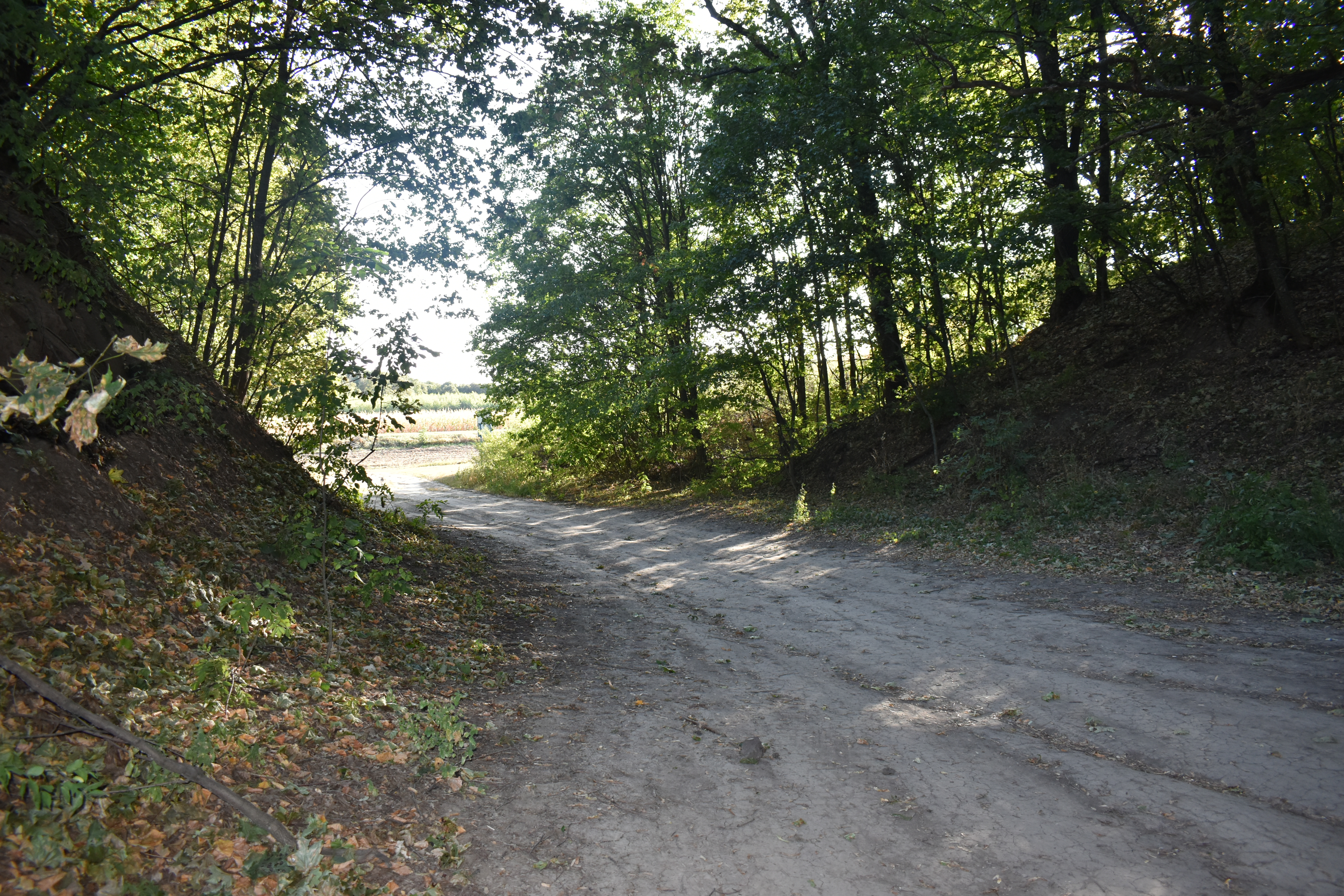
Ramparts of the Eastern Bilsk settlement

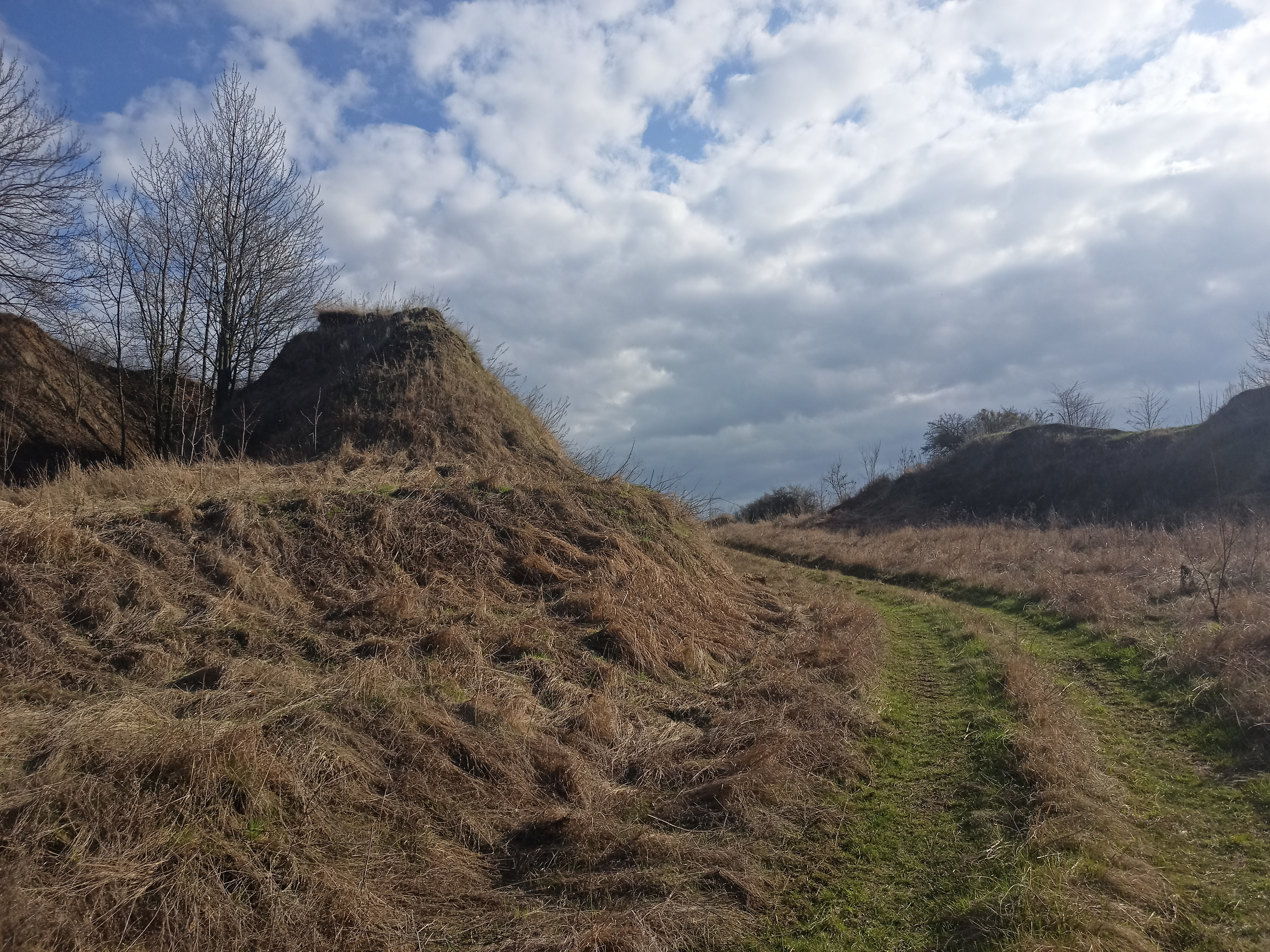
Ramparts of the Kuzemyn settlement

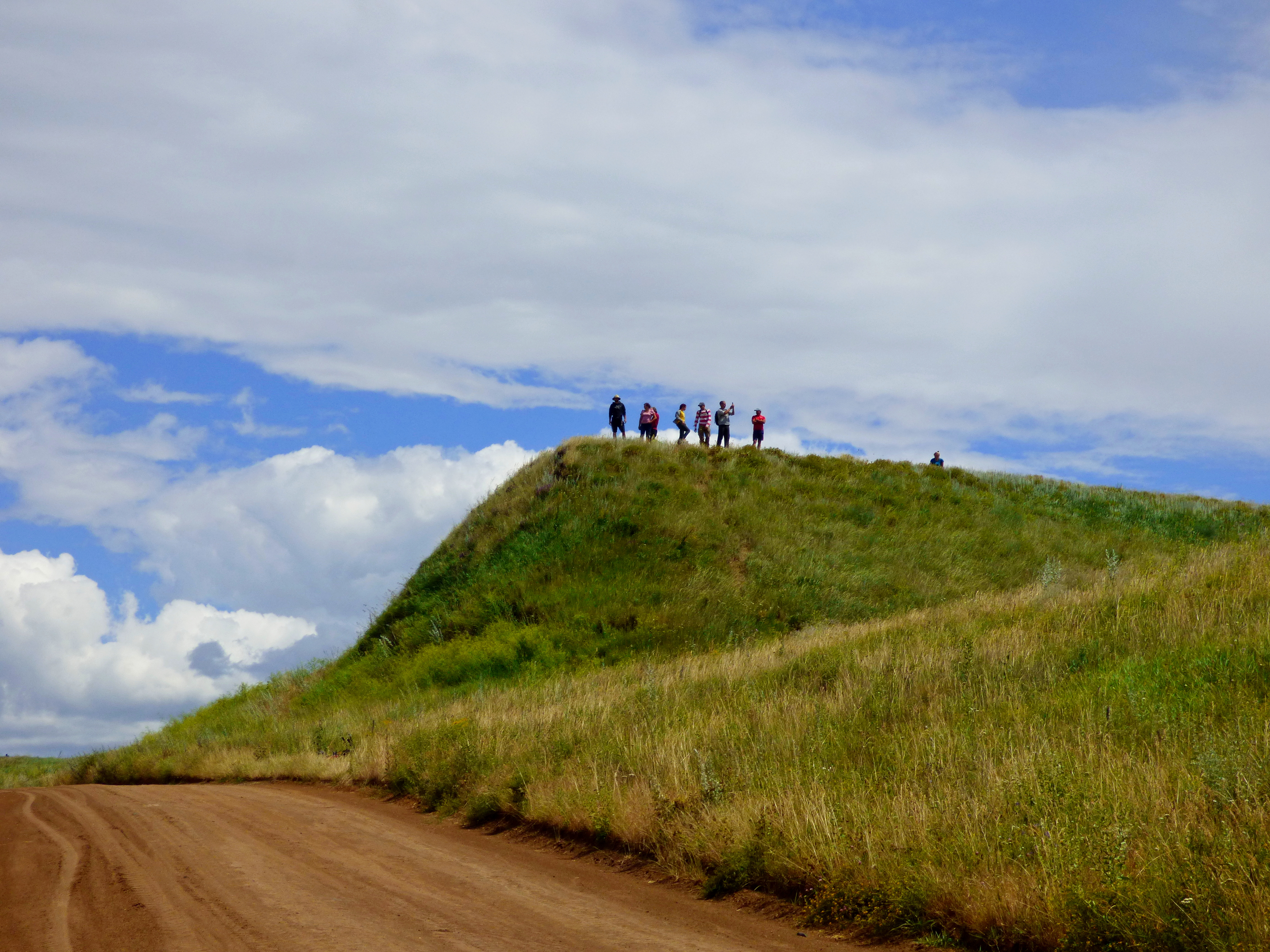
Tsaryna Mohyla, the highest point of the Bilsk hillfort

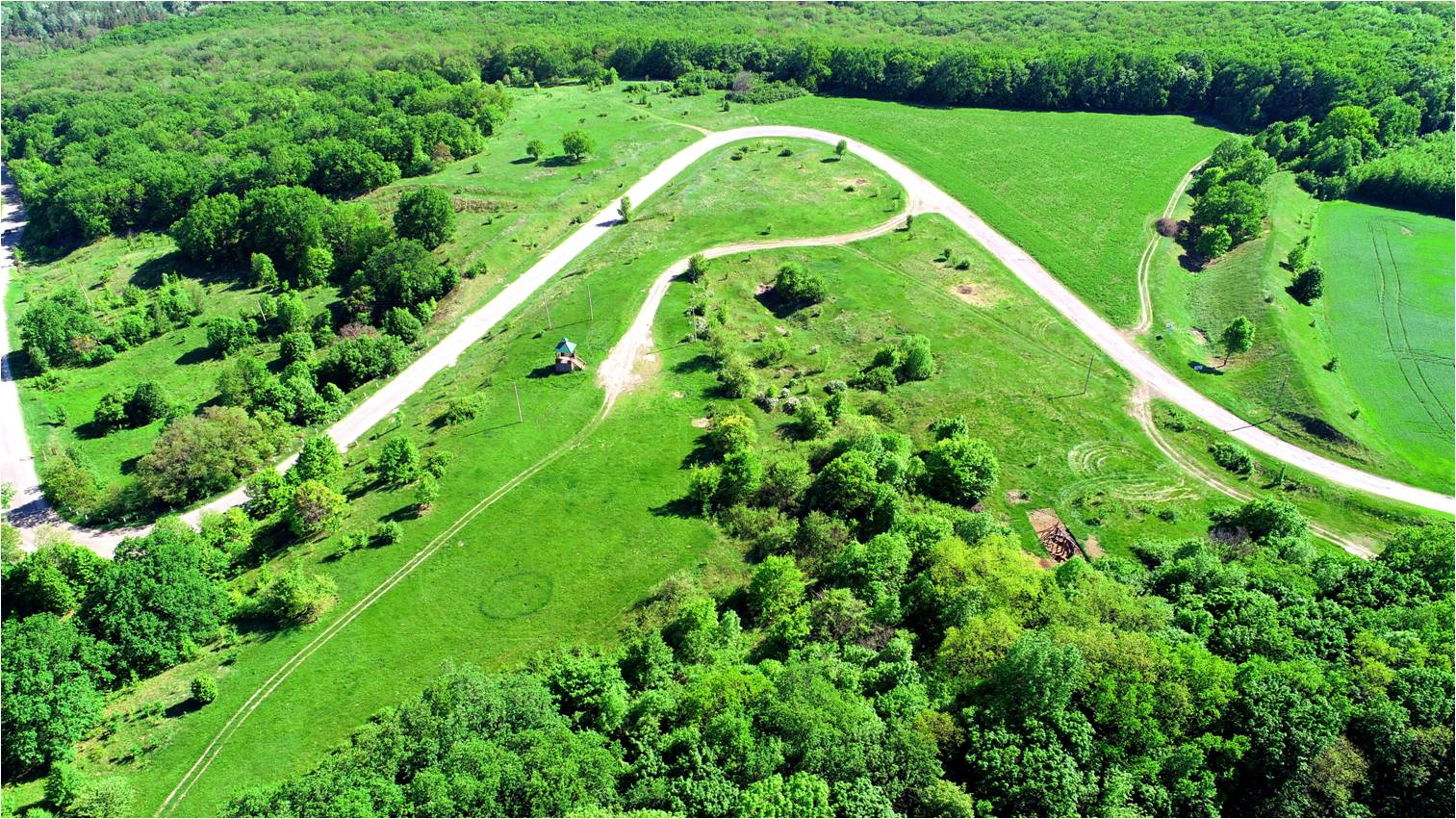
Barvinkova Hora burial site near the Eastern Bilsk settlement

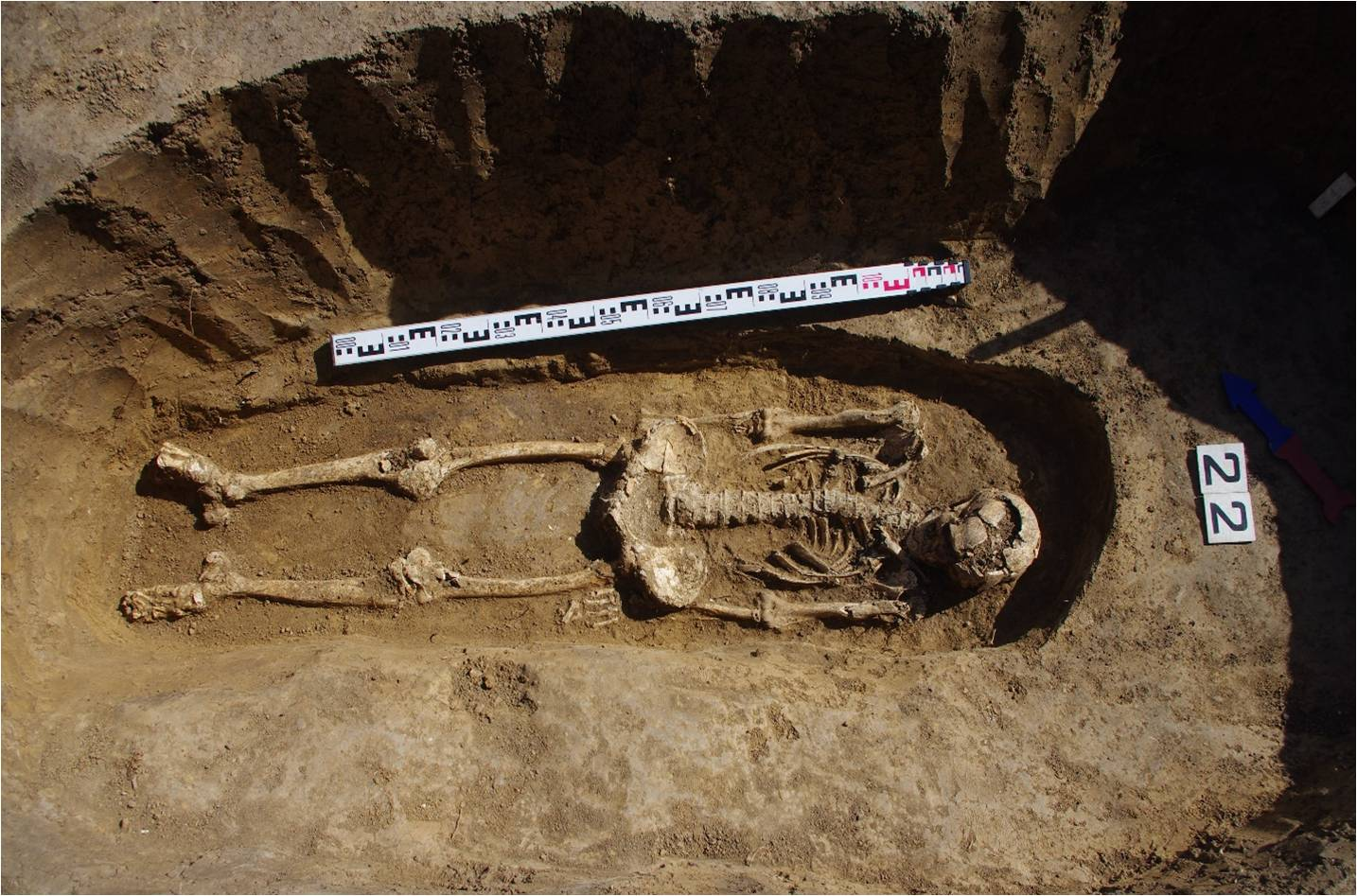
Burial at Barvinkova Hora

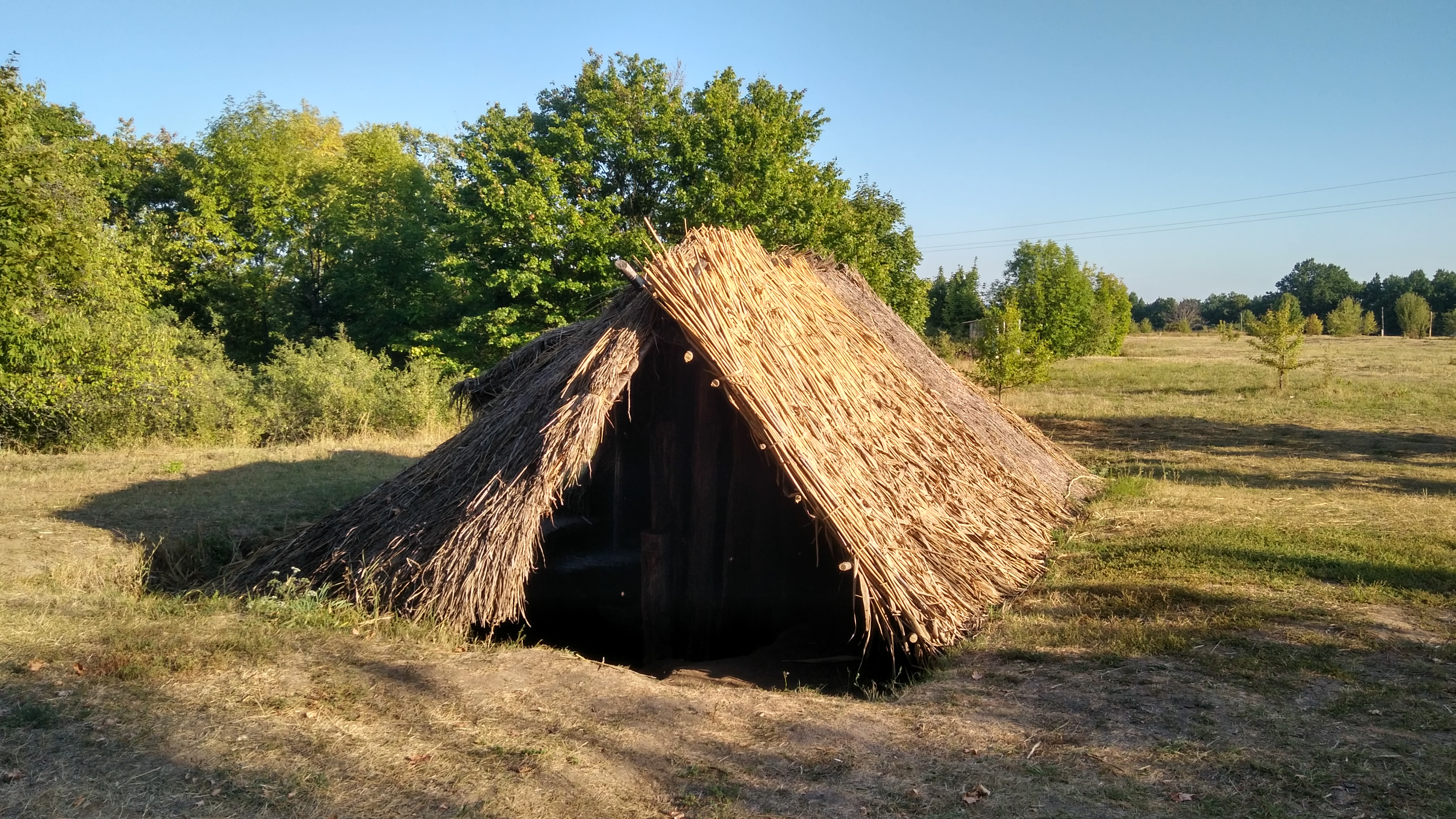
Reconstruction of an ancient dwelling

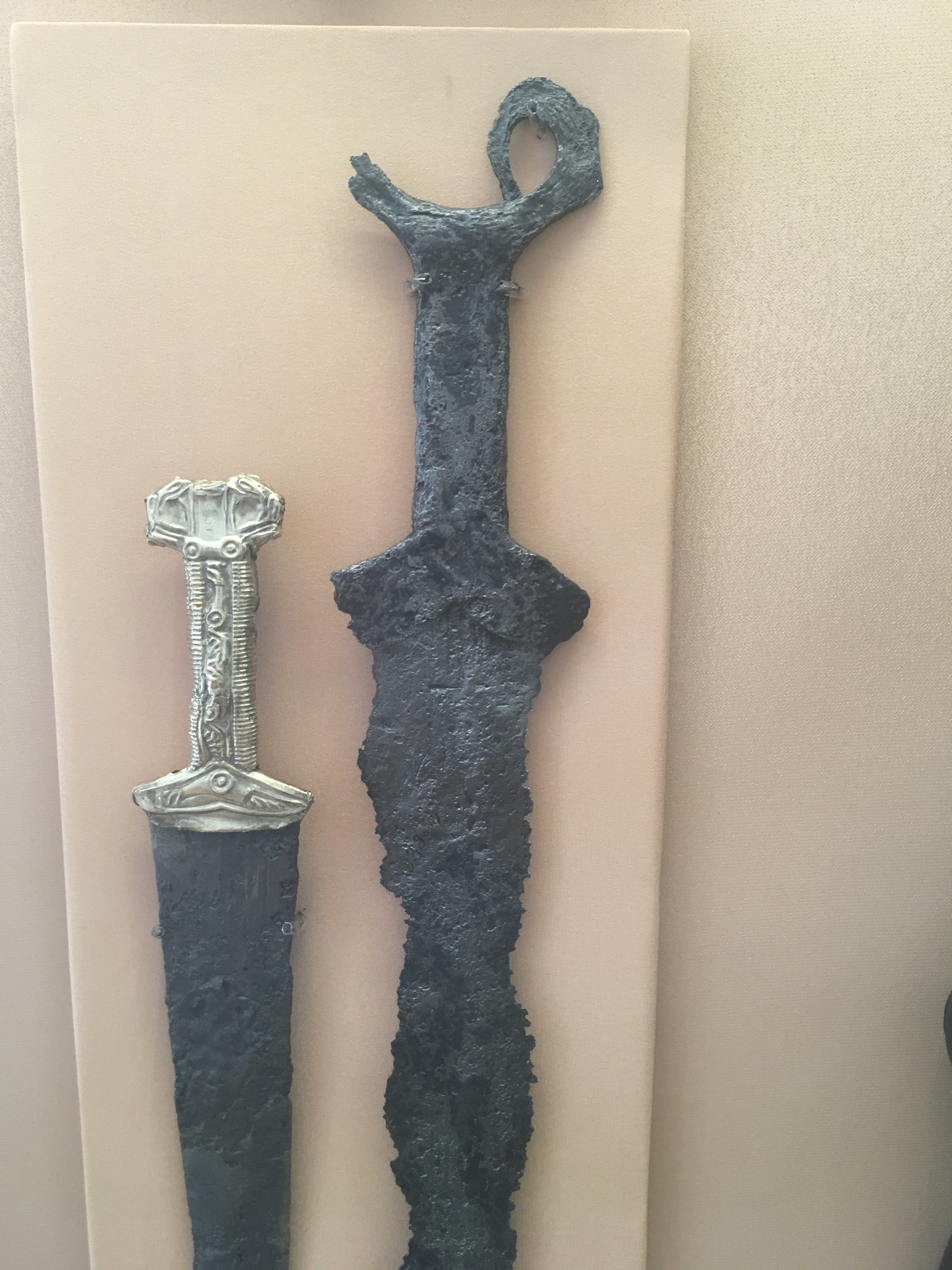
Sword with a golden handle

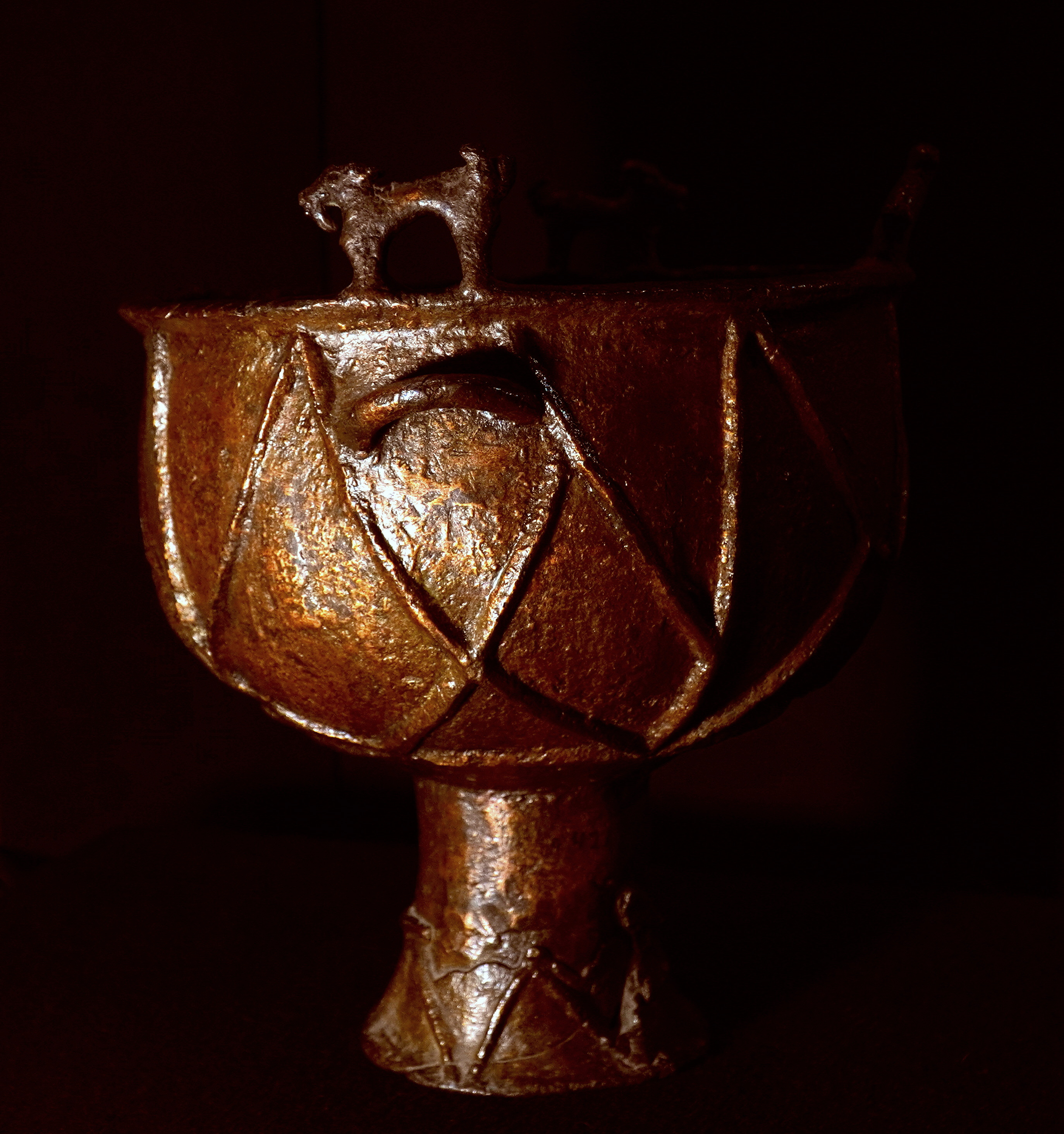
Scythian bronze pot

== Sources ==
- Археологічні дослідження Більського городища. — Kyiv; Kotelva, 2014. АДБГ — 2013. — p. 124
