= Bilsk, Poltava Oblast =

Rural locality in Poltava Oblast, Ukraine

Coordinates: 50°05′35″N 34°37′54″E

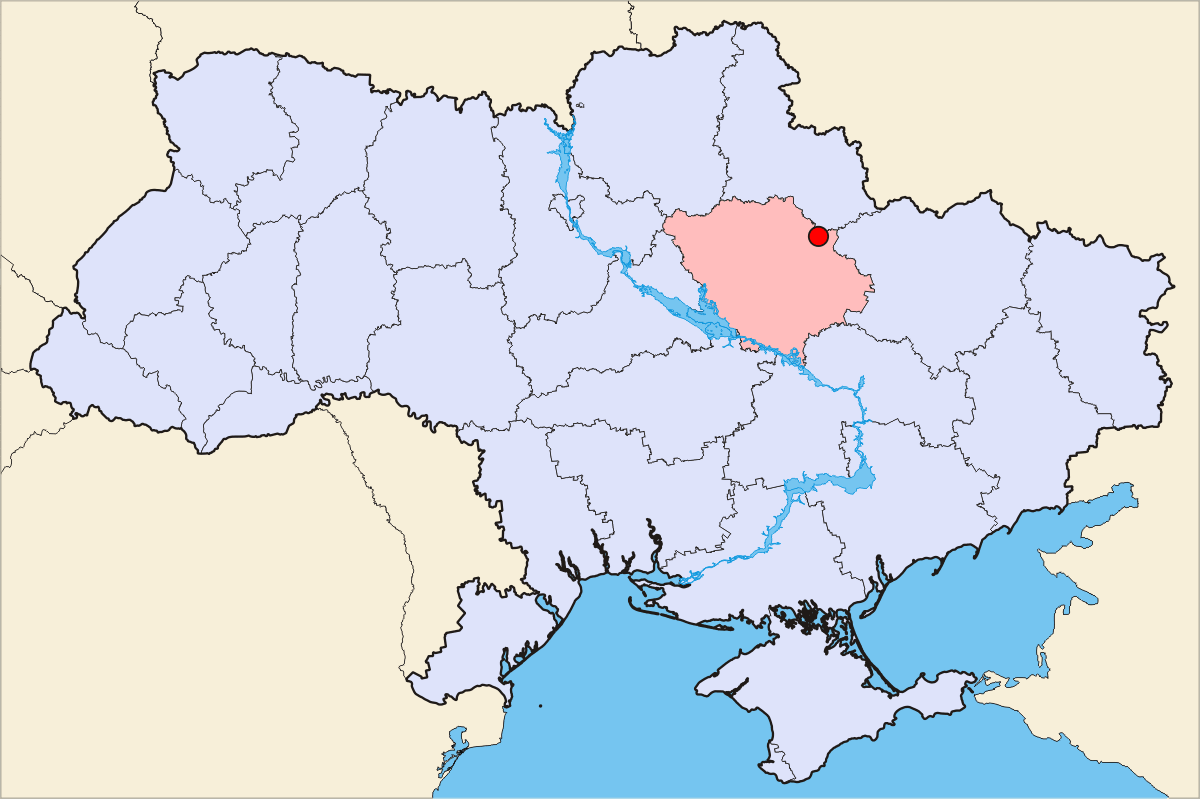
Location of Bilsk village in Ukraine

Bilsk (Ukrainian: Більськ) is a village in Poltava Raion, Poltava Oblast, Ukraine. It belongs to Kotelva settlement hromada, one of the hromadas of Ukraine.

Bilsk is better known for its archaeological landmark Bilsk hillfort, propounded by some Ukrainian archaeologists as the location of Gelonus, the principal city of the tribe of the Budini.

Until 18 July 2020, Bilsk belonged to Kotelva Raion. The raion was abolished in July 2020 as part of the administrative reform of Ukraine, which reduced the number of raions of Poltava Oblast to four. The area of Kotelva Raion was merged into Poltava Raion.
