= Vasily Gorodtsov =

Russian archaeologist (1860–1945)

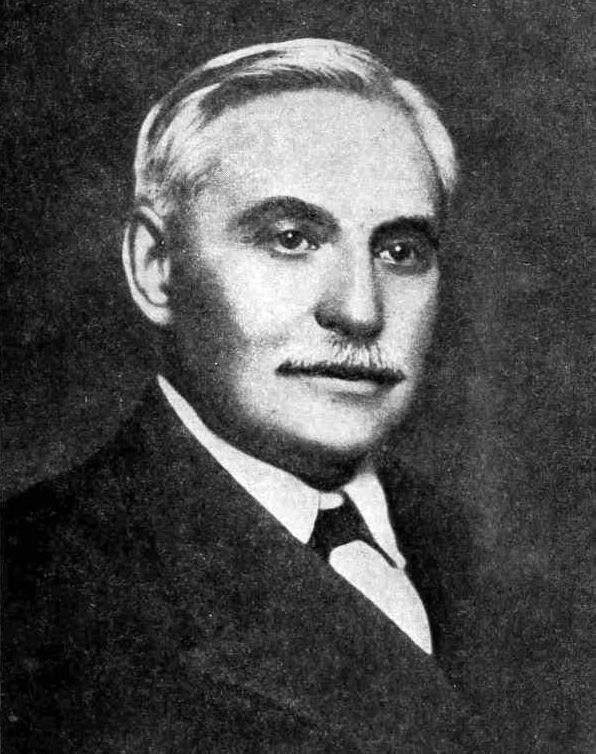
Vasily Gorodtsov

Vasily Alekseyevich Gorodtsov (Russian: Василий Алексеевич Городцов; 23 March (O.S. 11 March), 1860, village of Dubrovichi, Ryazan Oblast — 3 February 1945, Moscow) was a leading Russian and Soviet archaeologist of the first half of the 20th century.

In 1903, Gorodtsov identified three stages of the Bronze Age in the Pontic–Caspian Steppe, which he named after the prevalent burial method (in pits, catacombs, and timber framing, respectively): the Yamnaya, Catacomb, and Srubnaya cultures (the so-called "Gorodtsov triad"). He also assigned names to the Fatyanovo, Volosovo, Gorodets, and other cultures of the forest zone.

== Life and career ==
From 1880 to 1906, Gorodtsov served in the military while pursuing amateur archaeological research. In 1897, he published the undeciphered Alekanovo inscription, which he thought was written in "Slavic runes". He was the first to undertake large-scale excavations at Old Ryazan.

Rising to the rank of lieutenant colonel, he worked primarily at the Russian Historical Museum from 1906 to 1929. Heading the museum's archaeological department, Gorodtsov co-founded the Society of Friends of the Historical Museum in 1919 and acted as its chairman from 1922. He conducted excavations across various regions of Russia and Ukraine (e.g., at the Bilsk hillfort) while also teaching. He read lectures at the Moscow State University from 1918, training the first generation of Soviet archaeologists (Artemiy Artsikhovsky, Boris Rybakov, etc.).

Gorodtsov was an honorary or full member of more than 20 scientific organisations connected with archaeology, natural sciences or folklore. He participated in excavations until the late 1930s and accumulated a record of over 200 publications. He was named a Distinguished Scientist of the Soviet Union in 1929 and doctor of historical sciences in 1935. He was awarded the Order of Lenin in 1944.

Based on similarities between Dacian and Russian applied arts, Gorodtsov proposed a hypothesis of Slavic origins for the Dacians, which was later criticised heavily. Lacking formal education, he paid little attention to advancements in foreign archaeology and, after the October Revolution, ceased to refine excavation techniques. Notably, he examined cultural layers using narrow trenches.
