= Gelonus =

Ancient city, capital of the Gelonians

Gelonus (Ancient Greek: Γελωνός) was, according to Herodotus, the capital of the Gelonians.

== Search for Gelonus ==
In his account of Scythia (Inquiries book 4), Herodotus writes that the Gelonii were formerly Greeks, having settled away from the coastal emporia among the Budini, where they "use a tongue partly Scythian and partly Greek":

The Budini for their part, being a large and numerous nation, are all mightily blue-eyed and ruddy. And a city among them has been built, a wooden city, and the name of the city is Gelonus. Of its wall then in size each side is of thirty stades and high and all wooden. And their homes are wooden and their shrines. For indeed there is in the very place Greek gods’ shrines adorned in the Greek way with statues, altars and wooden shrines and for triennial Dionysus festivals in honour of Dionysus...Above the Sauromatae (Sarmatians), possessing the second region, dwell the Budini, whose territory is thickly wooded with trees of every kind. The Budini are a large and powerful nation: they have all deep blue eyes, and bright red hair. The Budini, however, do not speak the same language as the Geloni, nor is their mode of life the same. They are the aboriginal people of the country, and are nomads; unlike any of the neighbouring races, they eat 'phtheir'. Their country is thickly planted with trees of all manner of kinds. In the very woodiest part is a broad deep lake, surrounded by marshy ground with reeds growing on it. Here otters are caught, and beavers, with another sort of animal which has a square face. With the skins of this last the natives border their capotes: and they also get from them a remedy, which is of virtue in diseases of the womb...Beyond the Budini, as one goes northward, first there is a desert, seven days' journey across...

The fortified settlement of Gelonus was reached by the Persian army of Darius in his assault on Scythia during the late 6th century BC, already burned to the ground, the Budini having abandoned it before the Persian advance. The Scythians sent a message to Darius: "We are free as wind and what you can catch in our land is only the wind". By employing a scorched earth strategy, they avoided battles, leaving "earth without grass" by burning the steppe in front of the advancing Persians (Herodotus). The Persian army returned without a single battle or any significant success.

According to some researchers, the Budinis were a Finnic tribe ruled by the Scythians.

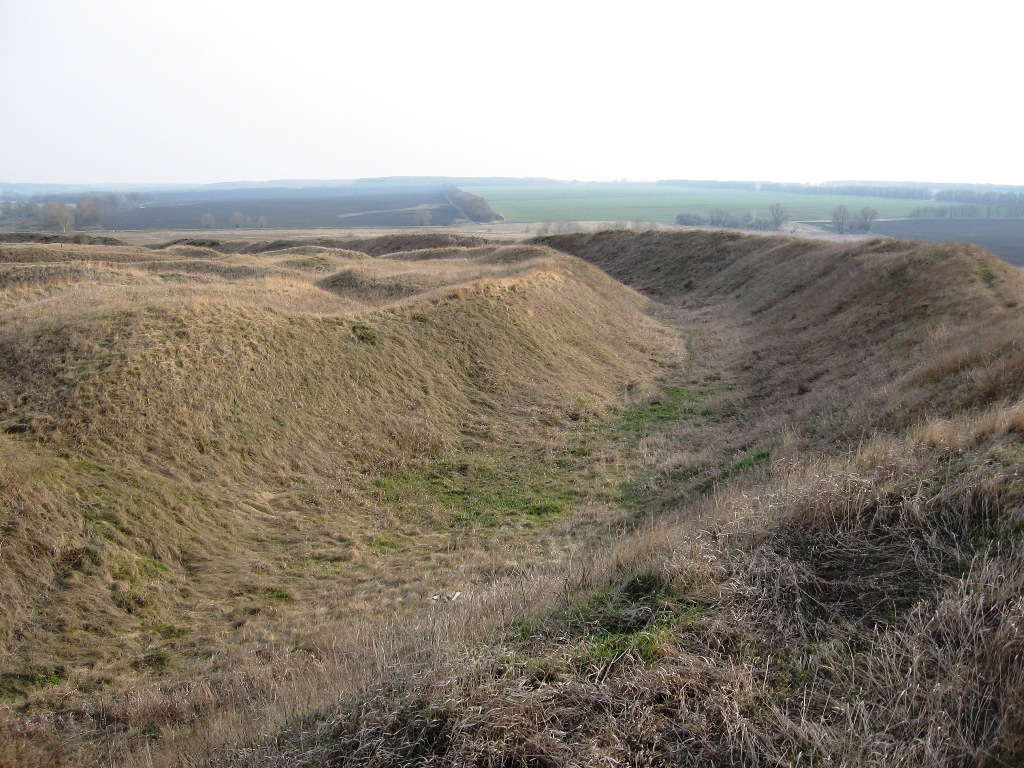
Bilsk hillfort

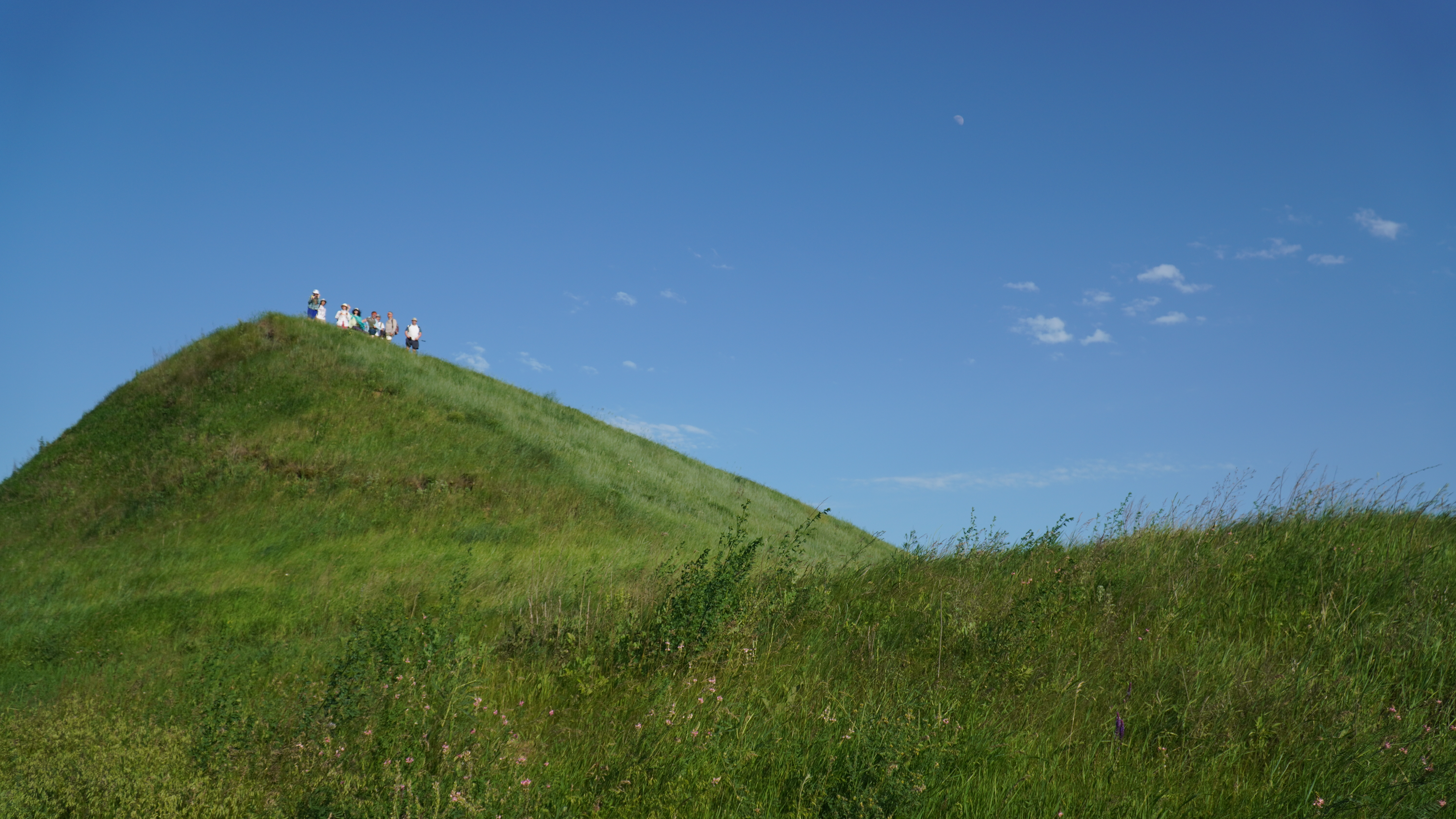
Bilsk hillfort

Excavations at Bilsk hillfort near the village of Bilsk near Poltava in Ukraine have led to suggestions by archaeologist Boris Shramko and others identifying it as the Scythian capital Gelonus. It is strategically situated on the exact boundary between the steppe and forest-steppe. Several other locations have traditionally been named by Russian archaeologists, such as Saratov (according to Ivan Zabelin) or a location near the Don River closer to the Volga River.

According to Herodotus, each side of Gelonus is 30 stades long, the area in today's units would be about 30 square kilometres. The archeological site around Bilsk, including necropolis, comprises about 80 km², and the fortifications enclose some 40 km². The north-south axis, along the Vorskla River is 17 km long. The remains of walls up to 12 metres are visible today and stretch over the horizon. The total length of the ramparts is 33 km. Inside the fortification, lay three "keeps", 150,000 m², 650,000 m², and 720,000 m² in area, surrounded by eroded earth walls still up to 16 metres high. Several kurgans reminded the inhabitants of the ancient Scythian burial tradition.

== Mythology ==
In Greek mythology, Gelonus was the son of Echidna and Heracles, he had an older brother Agathyrsus and a younger Scythes. Hylea is pointed to be where was the Echidna's cave between people Arimi or Harimi, the Greeks on the Euxine believed that this was somewhere in Scythia.

== Bibliography ==
- Мурзін В., Ролле Р., Супруненко О. Більське городище. – Київ-Гамбург-Полтава, 1999. – 104 с.
- Боплан Г.Л.де. Опис україни. – К., 1990. – 254 с.
- Шрамко Б.А. Крепость скифского времени у с.Бельск – город Гелон // Скифский мир. – К., 1975.
- Шрамко Б.А. Бельское городище скифской эпохи (город Гелон). – К., 1987. – 182 с.
- Більське городище в контексті вивчення пам’яток раннього залізного віку Європи. – Полтава, 1996. – 408 с.
