= Bondarikha culture =

Archaeological culture of modern-day Ukraine

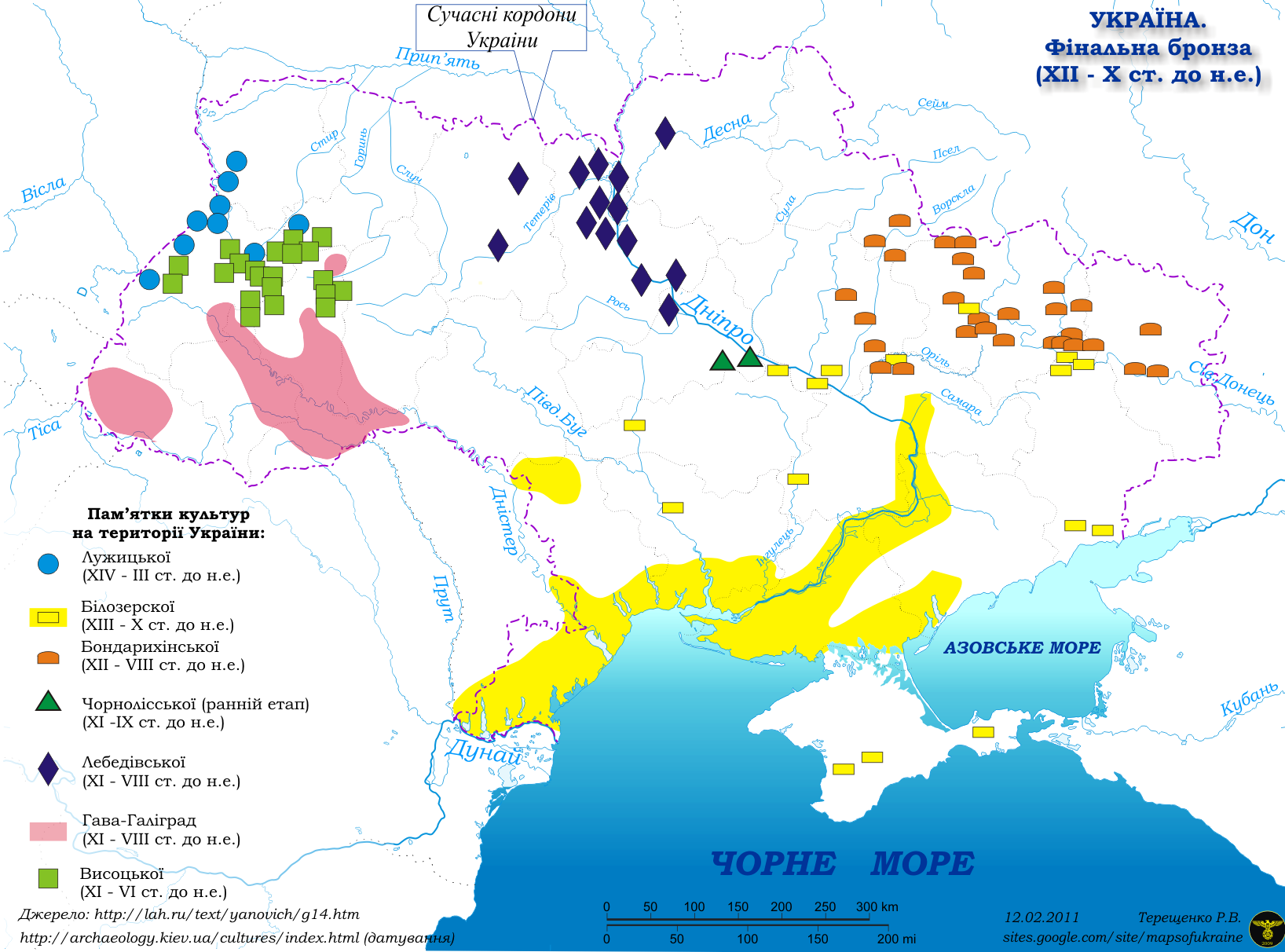
- Geographical range: Ukraine
- Period: Bronze Age
- Dates: 11th century - 9th century BCE
- Preceded by: Srubnaya culture
- Followed by: Yukhnovskaya culture, Gorodets culture

The Bondarikha culture or Bondarikhinskaya culture was a Late Bronze Age (11th-9th centuries BCE) culture that occupied territories on both sides of the modern Ukraine-Russia border, replacing the Srubnaya culture. It was found from the left shore of the Dnepr to the upper and mid Seversky Donets, and it the east it reached the Don bassin and mid-Oka.

The culture was identified in 1951 by Varvara Ilyinskaya near what is now Izium. It is represented by both fortified and non-fortified settlement, grave fields, treasures and scattered finds. They lived in pit houses, semi-pit houses, and houses on flat ground. Excavations found potsherds, flint sickles, pestles and other tools, as well as the bones of cattle, goats, horses, pigs, and sheep. The cemeteries are tumuli, and flat ground graves with cremated remains in urns or small pits.

There are about 20 Bondarikha sites on the terraces of various rivers throughout Ukraine. One important find was a socketed celt (ax-head), which, among Bondarikha sites, has a distinguishing mid-rib that is not found on other Srubnaya celts. The sites have also yielded examples of metallurgy, such as an iron awl, an iron knife, and the blade of a bronze dagger.

The end of the Bondarikha culture was contemporaneous with the ends of the Belozerka and Belogrudovka cultures. It was followed by the Yukhnovskaya culture and the Gorodets culture. Boris Shramko assigned the Bondarikha culture to the early Cimmerians.
