= Boris Shramko =

Ukrainian professor of history (1921–2012)

Boris Andriyovich Shramko (Ukrainian: Борис Андрійович Шрамкo; born on 17 January 1921, Gomel, Belarus — 8 July 2012, Kharkiv, Ukraine) was a Ukrainian historian and professor of history. He was based at the Kharkov State University (from which he graduated after the four-years service in the Red Army during the World War II).

Shramko is best known for excavating the Bilsk hillfort (between Poltava and Sumy) and suggesting it to be the Scythian capital Gelonus. The hillfort is strategically situated on the exact boundary between the steppe and forest-steppe. Shramko associated the earlier Bondarikha culture with the Cimmerians.

== Bibliography ==
- Мурзін В., Ролле Р., Супруненко О. Більське городище. – Київ-Гамбург-Полтава, 1999. – 104 с.
- Шрамко Б.А. Крепость скифского времени у с.Бельск – город Гелон // Скифский мир. – К., 1975.
- Шрамко Б.А. Бельское городище скифской эпохи (город Гелон). – К., 1987. – 182 с.
- Більське городище в контексті вивчення пам’яток раннього залізного віку Європи. – Полтава, 1996. – 408 с.
