= Alekanovo inscription =

Undeciphered script

Reproduction of the Alekanovo inscription

The Alekanovo inscription is a group of undeciphered characters found in the fall of 1897 in the Russian village of Alekanovo (Ryazan Oblast) by Russian archeologist Vasily Gorodtsov. The characters were inscribed on a small clay pot 15 cm high, located in a Slavic burial site. While the inscription was found to be authentic, there is no widely accepted reading of it. The inscription was dated by Gorodtsov to 10th–11th century AD. Similar characters on shards were found in Alekanovo in 1898.

Gorodtsov proposed that the characters might be runes, but found only two characters similar to runes. According to Polish ethnographer Jan Leciejewski, the inscription is mirror writing and should be read right-to-left. Another view is that the inscription represents a local character set, devised in the Vyatich tribal union.
