= Gorodets culture =

Archaeological culture in Russia

- Geographical range: Volga region; Don Steppe
- Period: Iron Age
- Dates: c. 8th century BC—5th century AD
- Preceded by: Pozdnyakovo culture
- Followed by: Proto-Mordvins
- Defined by: Gorodtsov (1899)

The Gorodets culture is an Iron Age archaeological culture associated with the Volga region and Don Steppe of Russia, which existed from around the 8th-7th century BC to the 4th-5th century AD. (Note: Other date ranges given include 700 BC—100 AD and 800 BC—800 AD.)

== Definition and chronology ==
Vasily Gorodtsov defined the Gorodets culture as distinct from the Dyakovo culture in 1899. The Gorodets culture, like the Dyakovo culture, descended from the Pozdnyakovo culture.

== Sites ==
The majority of Gorodets habitation sites were short-term settlements. Permanent structures are only known from settlements in river basins and associated with hillforts. These short-term settlements were probably seasonal, and associated with slash-and-burn agriculture.

Gorodets hillforts are typically triangular, with an earthen bank and ditch on one side and natural boundaries (such as waterways or gullies) on the other two sides. Houses were generally built against the interior side of the earthen embankment. Some hillforts have cult features, such as clay altars at Toporok and Gorodets. At Aleksejevskoje hillfort, a fireplace containing burnt human and animal bones was discovered.

== Artefacts ==
Gorodets sites have yielded ceramics, bone tools, stone artefacts, and metalwork. Metal artefacts include tools and weapons, which were mostly iron while jewelry was mainly in bronze. Crucibles and moulds are evidence of local metalworking.

=== Ceramics ===
Gorodets ceramics form a continuation of the Netted Ware culture and mainly comprise earthenware pots for kitchen use, with crushed rocks, chamotte, and sand added to the clay body. Jugs and cups have also been found. Most ceramic vessels are decorated with textile and cord imprinting, comb marks, finger marks, notches, and punctures. Gorodets pottery is similar to that of the Scythians, which is attributed to interaction between the two groups in the same region. The use of pots, as opposed to the previously used jars, is also attributed to Scythian influence. Undecorated pottery is characteristic of the later Gorodets hillforts.

While imported Greek ceramics have been found at Scythian sites, no such imports have been found at Gorodets sites.

At the Lbishche archaeological site on the Samara Bend, the pottery of the lower strata have been identified with the Gorodets culture and dated to the 3rd or 2nd century BC.

== Association with Volga Finnic ethnogeneses ==
The Gorodets culture is geographically correlated with Proto-Mordvinic and Muroma, and also influenced the Mari language. According to László Klima, late Gorodets pottery is near-identical to that of Proto-Mordvin cemeteries of the early 1st millennium AD, which he argues implies a direct lineage. The role of the Gorodets culture in Mari ethnogenesis is subject to academic debate.
